= List of political parties in Egypt =

Egypt has had differing multi-party systems since independence, with a hiatus between 1953 and 1977, after which the current party law was enacted. Nevertheless, in practice the National Democratic Party was the long-time ruling party and dominated the Egyptian political arena, first under president Anwar Sadat, and then president Hosni Mubarak from its foundation in 1978, up until its dissolution in the wake of the Egyptian Revolution of 2011, and the ousting of Mubarak. Under Mubarak, opposition parties were allowed, but were widely considered to have no real chance of gaining power. On 28 March 2011, the Supreme Council of the Armed Forces amended Political Party Law 40/1977, easing restrictions on the legal establishment of new political parties in Egypt, where many new parties covering the political spectrum were formed. After the 2013 popular coup/revolution, and a further seismic political shift, another wave of new parties were formed, a large number of which were aligned with current non-partisan president, Abdel Fattah al-Sisi. In December 2020, final results of the parliamentary election confirmed a clear majority of the pro-Sisi Mostaqbal Watan (Nation’s Future) Party.

== Parties in history ==
- Liberation Rally: 23 January 1953 – 28 May 1957 (4 years, 120 days)
- National Union: 28 May 1957 – 21 May 1962 (4 years, 358 days)
- Arab Socialist Union: 21 May 1962 – 2 October 1978 (16 years, 134 days)
- National Democratic Party: 2 October 1978 – 16 April 2011 (32 years, 196 days)

== Restricted partisan pluralism (1977 – 25 January 2011) ==
Under the new Infitah (liberal realignment) of president Anwar Sadat, and in the aftermath of the 1973 October War and the peace process with Israel, Sadat’s decree in March 1976 founded a three-party platform within the framework of the Arab Socialist Union, representing the right, the center and the left, before spinning them off on 22 November of the same year into political parties. These three parties, were the first nucleus of the restricted partisan pluralism allowed by the Political Parties Law 40/1977:

- Egyptian Arab Socialist Party (1976).
- The Socialist Liberal Party (1976–2011).
- National Progressive Unionist Rally Party (Ḥizb al-Tagammu' al-Watani al-Taqadomi al-Wahdawi – 1976).
- Parties established later by declaration by the Parties Affairs Committee (10):
- The New Wafd Party (1978).
- The National Democratic Party (1978–2011).
- The Socialist Labour Party (1978).
- The National Conciliation Party (2000).
- Al-Ghad Party (2004).
- The Free Social Constitutional Party (Al-Hizb Al-Distouri – 2004).
- The Democratic Peace Party (2005).
- The Conservative Party (2006).
- The Free Republican Party (Al-Hizb al-Gomhory al-Ahrar – 2006).
- The Democratic Front Party (2007).

Parties established by judicial rulings (11):

- The National Umma Party (1983).
- The Democratic Unionist Party (1990).
- The Egyptian Green Party (1990).
- Young Egypt Party (Misr Al-Fatah – 1990).
- People's Democratic Party (1992).
- The Arab Democratic Nasserist Party (1992).
- Social Justice Party (1993).
- The Solidarity Party (Hizb Al-Takaful – 1995).
- Egypt 2000 Party (2001).
- Democratic Generation Party (Hizb El-Geel Al-Democrati – 2002).
- Egypt Youth Party (2005)

== Post-2011 revolution (2011–2013) ==
In the wake of the January 2011 uprising in Egypt, the deposition of Hosni Mubarak and dissolution of his National Democratic Party that ruled for over three decades, the Supreme Council of the Armed Forces issued a decree-law 12/2011 amending certain provisions of the Political Parties Law 40/1977, after which many parties were formed.

The legislation was however criticized as discriminatory. Under the law new parties are now required to have at least 5,000 members from at least ten of Egypt's provinces. Originally, new parties were only required to have 1,000 members. This was cited as a barrier for new parties before parliamentary elections which took place at the end of 2011 and beginning of 2012. Also, new party leaders are required to raise at least LE1 million to publish the names of the founding members in two widely circulated dailies, seen as favoring wealthier interests. No parties are able to form on the basis of religion or class, ruling out the formation of Islamic and labor parties. However, in practice, religious parties have been allowed. After first being denied a license by the political parties commission, the Supreme Administrative Court allowed Gamaa Islamiya to form the Building and Development Party. The political parties commission allowed the Al Nour Party to be approved in May 2011, in part because it does not refer to the hudud in their electoral program. An article on the Daily News Egypt website states that religious parties have gone around the ban by not explicitly advocating a state based on Islam in their political programs.

- Freedom and Justice Party (2011–2014)
- Ghad al-Thawra (splintered from Al-Ghad – 2011)
- Free Egyptians party (Al-Masrieen Al-Ahrar – 2011)
- The Conference Party (Al-Mo'tamar)
- The Socialist Popular Alliance Party (Al-Tahaluf al-Sha'bi – 2011)
- The Egyptian Social Democratic Party (Al-Masri El-Democrati, merger of the Liberal Egyptian Party, and the Egyptian Democratic Party – 2011)
- Al-Nour Party (2011)
- The Justice Party (Al-Adl – 2011)
- The Constitution Party (Al-Dostour – 2012)
- Republican People's Party (Al Shaab Al-Gomhouri – 2012)

== Post-2013 popular coup/revolution (2013–present) ==
On 3 July 2013, president Mohamed Morsi, the leader of the Freedom and Justice Party (FJP) was removed from power in the aftermath of the 30 June popular coup/revolution, which later resulted in a new (2014) constitution banning parties based on religion, effectively dissolving the dominant FJP.

In June 2014, Abdel Fattah el-Sisi became Egypt's first president not affiliated with a political party. However, a number of pro-Sisi parties have since formed, and by 2018, 104 political parties were officially registered and approved by the Committee of Parties.

- Bread and Freedom Party (splintered from Social Popular Alliance – 2013, provisional)
- Homeland Defenders Party (Homat Watan – 2013)
- Sadat Democratic Party (2014)
- Nation's Future Party (Mostakbal Watan – 2014)
- Popular Current (Al-Tayyar al-Shaabi – 2014)
- 30 June Party (2015)

== List of currently active parties ==
Egyptian politics are subject to unique circumstances and often defy simple classification in terms of the political spectrum. Currently, over 100 registered political parties in Egypt exist. Groups are sometimes associated with the political left or right, especially in international circles, according to their stance on issues. While the current Egyptian constitution prohibits the formation of political parties based on religion, there are parties that seek to establish Islamic sharia laws, or uphold the article in the constitution that states that sharia law is the main source of legislation, and others that support the formation of a secular state. The following is a categorization of political parties based on their social, economical, and political orientation, as well as their legal status:

=== Parties represented in the House of Representatives or the Senate ===
Name	Founded	Leader	Political position	Ideology	Senate	House	Position on 2013 coup d'état and 2011 revolution
Nation's Future Party حزب مستقبل وطن; Hizb Mustaqbal Watan	2014	Abdel-Wahab Abdel-Razeq	Big tent	Egyptian nationalism Economic liberalism Militarism	149 / 300	316 / 596	Pro-Coup
Homeland Defenders Party حزب حماة الوطن; Ḥizb Hamaat al-Watan	2013	Galal Haridy	Centre to centre-right	Centrism; Militarism	91 / 300	72 / 596	Pro-Coup
Republican People's Party حزب الشعب الجمهورى; Hezb al-Shaeb al-Gomhuri	2012	Hazem Omar	Centre-left to centre-right	Egyptian nationalism Secularism; Militarism; Liberalism; Social liberalism	17 / 300	50 / 596	Pro-Coup
New Wafd Party حزب الوفد المصري; Ḥizb al-Wafd al-Jadīd	1978	Bahaa El-Din Abu Shoka	Centre-right	Egyptian nationalism Secularism; Conservatism; Liberal conservatism Economic liberalism National liberalism Conservative liberalism	10 / 300	26 / 596	Anti-Coup
Modern Egypt Party حزب مصر الحديثة; Ḥizb Masr al-Haditha	2011	Nabil Deibis	Centre to centre-right	Liberalism	4 / 300	11 / 596	Pro-Coup
Reform and Development Party حزب الأصلاح و التنمية; Ḥizb al-Islah wa al-Tanmiyah	2009	Mohamed Anwar Esmat Sadat	Centre	Market liberalism	3 / 300	9 / 596	Anti-Coup
Egyptian Social Democratic Party الحزب المصرى الديمقراطى الاجتماعى al-Ḥizb al-Maṣrī al-Dimuqrāṭī al-Ijtmāʿī	2011	Mervat Tallawy	Centre-left	Secularism; Social democracy Social liberalism Progressivism	3 / 300	7 / 596	Anti-Coup
Egyptian Freedom Party حزب الحرية المصري; Hizb al-Huriyat al-Misriu	2011	Ahmed Muhanna	Big tent	Liberalism	1 / 300	7 / 596	Anti-Coup
Egyptian Conference Party حزب المؤتمر المصري; Ḥizb al-Muʾtamar al-Maṣrī	2012	Omar El-Mokhtar Semeida	Centre to centre-left	Big tent Social liberalism	3 / 300	7 / 596	Anti-Coup
Al-Nour Party حزب النور; Ḥizb an-Nūr	2011	Yunis Makhyun	Far-right	Salafi Islamism; Wahhabism; Madkhalism	2 / 300	7 / 596	Pro-Coup
National Progressive Unionist Rally Party حزب التجمع الوطني التقدمي الوحدوي; Ḥizb al-Tagammu' al-Watani al-Taqadomi al-Wahdawi	1977	Sayed Abdel Aal	Left-wing	Nasserism; Left-wing nationalism Democratic socialism Left-wing populism	4 / 300	6 / 596	Anti-Coup
Justice Party حزب العدل; Ḥizb el-Adl	2011	Hamdi Stouhi	Centre	Big tent Secularism	1 / 300	2 / 596	
Eradet Geel Party حزب إرادة جيل; Ḥizb 'Iiradat Jil	2019	Tayseer Matar			1 / 300	1 / 596	
Egyptian Patriotic Movement الحركة الوطنية المصرية; Ḥizb al-Ḥarakat al-Waṭaniyya al-Miṣriyya	2012	Sayed Abdel Aal	Centre	Secularism	2 / 300	0 / 596	
Sadat Democratic Party حزب السادات الديمقراطي; Hizb al-Saadat al-Diymuqratii	2014	Effat Sadat		Nationalism	1 / 300	0 / 596	

==== Non-represented parties ====
Party name English	Party name Arabic	Ideology	Political position	Legal status	Founded	Role in 2011 Egyptian Revolution	Notes
Revolutionary Guards Party	حزب حراس الثورة						
Human Rights and Citizenship Party	حزب حقوق الانسان والمواطنة		Centre	27 September 2011			
New Independent Party	الحزب المستقل الجديد						Created by former members of the National Democratic Party
Popular Current Party	at-tāyar ash-shāʿībi al-masri التيار الشعبي المصري			21 September 2014			
Consciousness Party	حزب الوعي			2011			
Knights of Egypt Party	فرسان حزب مصر; Forsan Masr	Liberalism					Founded by former members of the Egyptian military
National Bloc	لكتلة الوطنية						Founded by former members of the Constitution Party
Arabism Egypt Party	حزب مصر العروبة						Founded by Sami Anan
Arabic Popular Movement	الحركة الشعبية العربية						Founded by members of the Tamarod movement
Egyptian Hope Party	حزب الأمل المصري	Pragmatism					Founded by former members of the Constitution Party
Youth for Egypt Party	حزب شباب من أجل مصر	Islamism					Founded by former members of the Egyptian Muslim Brotherhood
My Homeland Egypt Party	Misr Baladi حزب مصر بلدي						Founded by former National Democratic Party members
Bread and Freedom Party	Eish we Horria حزب عيش وحرية	Socialism	Left-wing		2013		Founded by former members of the Socialist Popular Alliance Party
Democratic Jihad Party	حزب الجهاد الديموقراطي	Islamism	Centre				Founded by former members of the Egyptian Islamic Jihad group
Egyptian Will Party	حزب الإرادة المصرية						Founded by retired members of the Egyptian military
Constitution Party	El-Dostour حزب الدستور	Big tent, Liberalism	Centre-left	2012	2012	Supported	Founded by Mohamed ElBaradei
Al Ansar Party	حزب الأنصار	Islamism, Salafism					
Flag Party	حزب العلم	Islamism, Salafism					Founded by Hazem Salah Abu Ismail
We Are the People Party	حزب نحن الشعب			2014			Founded by former members of the parliament
Nubian Nile Party	حزب النيل النوبي						
Homeland Party	Al-Watan حزب الوطن	Islamism, Salafism		2013	2013		Founded by Emad Abdel Ghaffour
Pioneer Party	Al Riyada حزب الريادة			Unregistered	2011		Founded by former members of the Muslim Brotherhood
Victory Party	El Nasr حزب النصر	Sufism					Founded by a Sufi order
Arab Party for Justice and Equality	El Hezb el Araby lel Adl wel Mosawa الحزب العربي للعدل والمساواة	Arab nationalism			2011		Arab Bedouin tribes in Sinai and Upper Egypt
Social Peace Party	Al Salam el Egtemaii حزب السلام الاجتماعي	Social liberalism	Third Way		2011		
You Are Egyptian Party	Enta Masry حزب أنت مصري				2011		
Revolution Egypt Party	Masr El Thawra حزب مصر الثورة	Liberal democracy			2011		
Free Egypt Party	Masr el Horra حزب مصر الحرة				2011		
Quiver Party	El Kenana				2009		
Voice of Freedom Party	Sot el Horreya حزب صوت الحرية	Islamism, Sufism					Rifa’i Sufi order
Workers and Peasants Party	el Ommal wel Fallahin حزب العمال والفلاحين	Socialism	Left-wing				Founded by Kamal Khalil
Life of the Egyptians Party	Hayat el Masreyyn حزب حياة المصريين	Secularism					Founded by former MP Mohamed Abu Hamed
Egyptian Alliance Party	حزب التحالف المصري				2011		
Equality and Development Party	حزب المساواة والتنمية					Supported	
Egyptian Reform Party	حزب الإصلاح المصري	Islamism, Salafism	Right-wing	Unregistered	2011		Young Salafis
National Party of Egypt	Masr el Qawmi حزب مصر القومي				2011		
Egyptian Citizen Party	El Mowaten el Masri حزب المواطن المصري	Populism			2011		
Egypt Renaissance Party	Nahdet Masr حزب نهضة مصر						
Egypt Development Party	Masr el Tanmeya حزب مصر التنمية						
Egypt Revival Party	Masr el Nahda حزب احياء مصر						Founded by Hossam Badrawi
Union Party	El Etehad حزب الاتحاد	Egyptian nationalism	Centre		2011		Founded by Hossam Badrawi
Beginning Party	El Bedaya حزب البداية				2011		
Reform and Renaissance Party	El Eslah wel Nahda حزب اللإصلاح والنهضة	Islamism		Unregistered	2011		
Egyptian Change and Development Party	حزب التغيير والتنمية المصري	Islamism		Unregistered			
Islamic Party	الحزب الإسلامي	Islamism	Far-right				
Virtue Party	El Fadila حزب الفضيلة	Islamism, Salafism	Right-wing	2011			
Arab Unification Party	El Tawhid el Arabi حزب التوحيد العربي	Pan-Arabism, Islamism	Right-wing	2011			
Renaissance Party	El Nahda حزب النهضة	Islamism, Salafism	Right-wing				
Authenticity Party	El-Asala حزب الأصالة	Islamism, Salafism	Far-right	2011			
People Party	El Shaab حزب الشعب	Islamism	Right-wing	Unregistered	2012		Salafi Front
Egyptian Nation Party	El Omma el Masreya حزب الأمة المصرية	Islamism, Salafism	Right-wing	Unregistered	2012		
Egypt the Future Party	Masr el Mostaqbal حزب مصر المستقبل	Moderate Islamism	Centre		2012		Founded by Amr Khaled
New Labour Party	El Amal el gadid حزب العمل الجديد	Islamism, Salafist					
Strong Egypt Party	Masr Al-Qaweya حزب مصر القوية	Moderate Islamism	Centrist	Registered	2012	Supported	Founded by Abdel Moneim Aboul Fotouh
Life Party	El Haya حزب الحياة	Liberalism, Secularism, Coptic interests	Centre	2011	2011	Supported	Founded by Coptic Activist Micheal Meunier
Egyptian Current Party	El Tayyar el Masri حزب التيار المصري	Moderate Islamism	Centre	Registered	2011	Supported	Youths of Muslim Brotherhood
Unity Democratic Egyptian Party	El Wehda el Dimoqrati el Masri	Moderate, Secularism	Centre	Unregistered	2012		
Egyptian Arab Union Party	El Etehad el Masri el Arabi	Pan-Arabism, Secularism	Centre	Registered	2011		
Justice Party	El Adl	Liberalism, Secularism	Centre	Registered	2011	Supported	April 6 Movement, National Association for Change, Kefaya
Arab Democratic Nasserist Party	El Arabi el Dimoqrati el Nasseri	Nasserism, Secularism	Left-wing	Registered	1992		
Building and Development Party	El Benaa wel Tanmeya	Islamism	Right-wing	Registered	2011		
Al-Wasat Party	El Wasat	Moderate Islamism	Centre	2011	1996	Supported	Branching from the Muslim Brotherhood
Conservative Party	El Mohafezin	Conservatism, Secularism	Centre-right	Registered	2006		
Democratic Front Party	El Gabha el Dimoqrateya	Liberalism, Secularism	Centre	Registered	2007		
Democratic Generation Party	El Geel el Dimoqrati	Secularism, Liberal democracy		Registered	2002	Opposed	
Democratic Peace Party	El Salam el Dimoqrati	Secularism		Registered	2005		
Democratic Union Party	El Etehad el Dimoqrati	Secularism		Registered	1990		
Dignity Party	El Karama	Nasserism, Secularism	Left-wing			Supported	
Egypt 2000 Party	Masr 2000	Anti-globalization, Secularism			2001	Opposed	
Egyptian Communist Party	El Shoiou'i el Masri	Communism	Far left		1975	Supported	
Egypt Youth Party	Shabab Misr	Secularism			2005		
Egyptian Arab Socialist Party	Masr el Arabi el Eshteraki	Pan-Arabism	Left-wing		1977	Opposed	
Free Egyptians Party	El Masreyyn el Ahrar	Liberalism, Liberal Democracy, Capitalism, Free Market	Right-wing		2011	Support	
Free Republican Party	El Gomhouri el Hor				2006	Opposed	
Free Social Constitutional Party	El Dostouri el Egtemai' el Hor	Secularism, Liberal Democracy			2004		
Freedom Egypt Party	Masr el Horreya	Social democracy, Secularism,	Centre-left		2011	Supported	
Green Party of Egypt	El Khodr	Green politics, Secularism	Left		1990	Opposed	
Liberal Egyptian Party	El Masri El Liberali	Secularism, Liberalism, Pharaonism, Egyptian nationalism, Liberal Democracy	Centre	Awaiting license			
Liberal Socialists Party	El Ahrar el Eshterakeyyn	Liberalism	Centre-right		1977	Opposed	
National Conciliation Party	El Wifak el Watani	Secularism			2000		
Liberation Party	Hizb ut-Tahrir	Islamism	Far-right	Operational	1953, 1974		Founded by Taqiuddin al-Nabhani
People's Democratic Party	El Shaab el Dimoqrati	Secularism, Liberal Democracy		Currently frozen	1992		
Popular Socialist Alliance Party	El tahalof el Shaabi el Eshteraki	Socialism, Secularism	Far Left		2011		
Social Justice Party	El Adala el Egtemaei'a	Islamic socialism	Left-wing	Registered	1993	Opposed	
Egyptian Islamic Labour Party	El Amal el Islami el masri	Islamism		Suspended	1978		
Socialist Party of Egypt	El Eshteraki el Masri	Democratic Socialism, Secularism	Left-wing		2011	Supported	
Solidarity Party	El takafol				1995		
Tomorrow Party	El Ghad	Liberalism, Secularism	Centre		2004	Opposed	
The Revolution's Tomorrow	Ghad el Thawra	Liberalism, Secularism	Centre		2011	Supported	
Workers Democratic Party	El Ommal el Dimoqrati	Socialism, Secularism	Left-wing	Awaiting license	2011		
Young Egypt Party	Masr el Fatah	Islamism, Pan-Arabism			1990		

===== Active Egyptian political alliances =====
Alliance name (English)	Alliance name (Arabic)	Political orientation	Religious orientation	Legal status	Founded	Member parties
Civil Democratic Movement						Reform and Development Party, Socialist Popular Alliance Party, Constitution Party, Justice Party, Egyptian Social Democratic Party, Dignity Party, Freedom Egypt Party, Bread and Freedom Party
Egypt						Arab Democratic Nasserist Party, Arab Party for Justice and Equality, Democratic Generation Party, Democratic Peace Party, Egyptian Arab Socialist Party, Egyptian Patriotic Movement, My Homeland Egypt Party, Social Construction Party, Tomorrow Party, Victory Party, Voice of Egypt Party
National Front Alliance	تحالف الجبهة الوطنية					Egyptian Democratic, Nasserist Party, Future of Egypt Party, Dignity Party, Tagammu Party
For the Love of Egypt	Fee Hob Misr					Free Egyptians Party, New Wafd Party, Nation's Future Party, Conference Party, Conservative Party, Tamarod, Tomorrow Party, Sadat Democratic Party, Modern Egypt Party, Reform and Renaissance Party
Call of Egypt						Human Rights and Citizenship Party, We Are the People Party, New Independent Party, Arab Party for Justice and Equality, Homeland Defenders Party
Independent Current Coalition						Democratic Peace Party, Egyptian Arab Socialist Party
Egyptian Front						Modern Egypt Party, Republican People's Party, National Party of Egypt, Egyptian Liberation Party, Tomorrow Party, Egyptian Patriotic Movement, My Homeland Egypt Party, Democratic Generation Party, Tomorrow Party
Anti-Coup Alliance			Islamist		27 June 2013	Building and Development Party, Freedom and Justice Party, New Labour Party, Virtue Party, Egyptian Reform Party, Authenticity Party, People Party

=== Inactive Egyptian political alliances ===
Alliance name (English)	Alliance name (Arabic)	Political orientation	Religious orientation	Legal status	Founded	Member parties
Long Live Egypt						New Dawn Party, Egyptian Revolution Party
Social Justice Coalition		Leftist				National Association for Change, Nasserist People's Congress Party, National Conciliation Party, Revolution Egypt Party, Liberal Socialist Party, People Party, Democratic Union Party, Free Social Constitutional Party, Egypt's Future Party, Socialist Labour Party, Revolutionary Rescue Party, Egyptian National Council, Greenpeace Movement, Coalition of Egyptians Abroad, National Youth Council, Senior Nasserist Conference
Civil Democratic Current						Dignity Party, Constitution Party, Socialist Popular Alliance Party, Freedom Egypt Party, Popular Current Party, Bread and Freedom Party, Socialist Party of Egypt, Egyptian Social Democratic Party
Reawakening of Egypt						National Bloc, Socialist Party of Egypt, Egyptian Communist Party, Civil Democratic Current, Egyptian Democratic, Nasserist Party, Future of Egypt Party Tagammu Party Socialist Popular Alliance Party, Justice Party, Reform and Renaissance Party
Leftist Alliance		Leftist				Tagammu, Socialist Popular Alliance Party, Egyptian Communist Party, Socialist Party of Egypt
Egypt's Unity	وحدة مصر					
Islamic Alliance to Support Egypt	إسلاميون لدعم مصر					Free Front of the Islamic Group, Reform of the Islamic Group, Revolt of the Islamic Group, Brotherhood Dissidents, Brotherhood Without Violence
National Alliance						My Homeland Egypt Party, Egyptian Patriotic Movement, Democratic Generation Party, Egyptian Arab Socialist Party, Revolutionary Forces Bloc, Free Egyptians Party
Egyptian Wafd Alliance						New Wafd Party, Reform and Development Party, Conservative Party, Consciousness Party, Arab Alliance Party, Arab Party for Justice and Equality, Reform and Renaissance Party,
Nation Alliance						Flag Party, Egyptian Reform Party, Authenticity Party, People Party, Islamic Party, Virtue Party, New Labour Party
Islamist Coalition			Islamist			Egyptian Nation Party
Centrist Coalition				Unregistered		Civilization Party, Wasat Party
Free Nation Coalition			Islamist	Unregistered		Homeland Party, Building and Development Party
Independent Party Current				Unregistered		Democratic Peace Party
National Salvation Front				Unregistered		Egyptian Social Democratic Party, New Wafd Party, Farmers General Syndicate; Constitution Party, Egyptian Popular Current, Socialist Popular Alliance Party; National Association for Change; National Progressive Unionist Rally Party, Conference Party, Reform and Development Party, Dignity Party; Socialist Party of Egypt Egypt's Future Party, Democratic Generation Party, Social Peace Party, Freedom Party, Freedom Egypt Party, Egyptian Communist Party Free Egyptians Party, Arab Democratic Nasserist Party
Coalition for the Defense of Sharia			Islamist	Unregistered		Freedom and Justice Party, Building and Development Party, Al Nour Party; Safety and Development Party, Authenticity Party, People Party,Egyptian Reform Party
Civil Democratic Movement			Secular	Unregistered		Arab Democratic Nasserist Party, Democratic Front Party, Egyptian Communist Party, Free Egyptians Party, Freedom Egypt Party, Egyptian Green Party, Ghad El-Thawra Party, Life of the Egyptians Party, Liberal Constitutional Party, Liberals Party, New Wafd Party, Socialist Popular Alliance Party, Young Egypt Party
Egyptian Nation Alliance		Social Liberalism, Liberal democracy, Big tent		Unregistered	27 September 2012	Conference Party, New Wafd Party, Free Egyptians Party Socialist Party of Egypt, Egyptian Communist Party, Socialist Popular Alliance Party, Socialist Revolutionary Movement (January), Tagammu Party, Workers Democratic Party, Workers and Peasants Party, Egyptian Popular CurrentReform and Development PartyEgyptian Social Democratic PartyEgyptian Renaissance Party, Victory Party, Egyptian Liberation Party, Dignity Party
Social Justice Coalition			Secular	Unregistered		Egyptian Social Democratic Party, Socialist Party of Egypt, Constitution Party, Popular Coalition
Egyptian Bloc	الكتلة المصرية	Social Liberalism, Liberal democracy	Liberal	Registered	16 August 2011	Free Egyptians Party, Egyptian Social Democratic Party, Tagammu
Revolutionary Democratic Coalition	التحالف الديمقراطي الثوري	Leftist		Unregistered	19 September 2012	Socialist Party of Egypt, Tagammu Party, Workers and Peasants Party, Egyptian Communist Party, Egyptian Coalition to Fight Corruption, Socialist Revolutionary Movement (January), Socialist Youth Union, Mina Daniel Movement
Coalition of the People's Representatives				Unregistered		
Egyptian Popular Current	التيار الشعبي المصري	Big tent		Unregistered	21 September 2012	
Moderate Current Coalition		Centrism	Moderate Islamism	Non-registered		Wasat Party, Egyptian Current, Strong Egypt, Civilization Party, Justice Party
Democratic Alliance for Egypt	التحالف الديمقراطي من أجل مصر	Nationalist, Islamist	Mainly Islamic	Registered	June 2011	Democratic Generation Party, Egyptian Arab Socialist Party, Ghad El-Thawra Party, Dignity Party, Labour Party, Ahrar Party, Egyptian Reform Party, Reform and Renaissance Party, Freedom and Justice Party, Freedom and Development Party
The Revolution Continues Alliance	تحالف الثورة مستمرة	Centre-left	Mainly Secular	Registered	23 October 2011	Freedom Egypt Party, Egyptian Alliance Party, Equality and Development Party
Islamist Bloc	الكتلة الإسلامية	Far-right	Islamist (hardline Salafi)			Al Nour Party, Building and Development Party, Authenticity Party

== See also ==
- Politics of Egypt
- Lists of political parties
