= Egyptian Nation Alliance =

Defunct Egyptian electoral alliance

Egyptian Nation Alliance تحالف الأمة المصرية
- Leader: Amr Moussa; El-Sayyid el-Badawi
- Founded: 2012
- Ideology: Big tent Secularism; Leftism; Liberalism

The Egyptian Nation Alliance (Arabic: تحالف الأمة المصرية; Tahalof El-Umma El-Masriya; also translated as Egyptian National Alliance, Egyptian Patriotism Alliance, Alliance for the Egyptian Nation, Coalition of the Egyptian Nation, or Egyptian National Coalition) was a coalition of 12 parties.

== History ==
Known members of the coalition included the Ghad El-Thawra Party, the Democratic Front Party, the New Wafd Party, and 9 other parties. Purported members included the Conference Party, the Egyptian Popular Current, the Socialist Popular Alliance Party, the Egyptian Social Democratic Party, the Revolutionary Democratic Coalition and the Free Egyptians Party.

However, it is not entirely clear which parties joined the coalition. An article in Al Akhbar states that some parties that are mentioned as members have not yet made a final decision on whether to join the coalition.

== Formerly affiliated parties ==
- Conference Party
- New Wafd Party
- Free Egyptians Party
- Egyptian Social Democratic Party
- Socialist Party of Egypt
- Egyptian Communist Party
- Socialist Popular Alliance Party
- Socialist Revolutionary Movement (January)
- Tagammu Party
- Workers Democratic Party
- Workers and Peasants Party
- Egyptian Popular Current
- Reform and Development Party
- Egyptian Renaissance Party
- Victory Party
- Egyptian Liberation Party
- Dignity Party
