= 2019 Egyptian constitutional referendum =

- 20–22 April 2019

Results
Choice	Votes	%
Yes	23,416,741	88.83%
No	2,945,680	11.17%
Valid votes	26,362,421	96.94%
Invalid or blank votes	831,172	3.06%
Total votes	27,193,593	100.00%
Registered voters/turnout	61,344,503	44.33%

A constitutional referendum was held in Egypt between 20 and 22 April 2019, The main proposed amendments were re-establishing the presidential term to six years, from four previously, and lengthening the then president's current term and allowing him to stand for an additional term in office, thereby allowing President Abdel Fattah el-Sisi to potentially remain in power until 2030. The changes were approved by 88.83% of voters who voted, with a 44% turnout.

== Preparation ==
Plans to amend the constitution were prepared by the General Intelligence Directorate (Mukhabarat) around December 2018, with nearly daily meetings headed by el-Sisi's son Mahmoud el-Sisi, Deputy Director of the Mukhabarat. Some meetings were also attended by Abbas Kamel, the Director of the Mukhabarat. The initial plans were to extend the presidential term to six years while retaining a maximum of two terms and to weaken the powers of parliament.

Security services planned "wide-reaching arrest campaigns of civilian public figures from across the political spectrum" as a method of "not [tolerating] dissent on any scale regarding the amendments".

== Proposed amendments ==
Article 140 is amended to lengthen the presidential term from four to six years and article 241 changes to lengthen el-Sisi's current term and allow him to stand for an additional term in office. Other changes restore the president's ability to appoint Vice-Presidents (which had been abolished in 2012) and strengthen the powers of the president over the judiciary, with modifications to articles 185, 189 and 193 making the president head of the Higher Council for Judicial Authorities, which would appoint the public prosecutor and judicial leaders, as well as giving the president the power to directly appoint the head of the Supreme Constitutional Court.

Two amendments further embed the role of the military in government, with a proposed change to article 200 to state that the military should "preserve the constitution and democracy, maintain the basic pillars of the state and its civilian nature, and uphold the gains of the people, and the rights and freedoms of individuals". A revision of article 234 would make the army's role in selecting the Defence Minister a permanent requirement.

Further amendments make the parliament a bicameral body, with the Shura Council abolished in 2014 restored as the Senate, which would consist of 120 elected members and 60 appointed by the president. Changes to article 102 reduce the number of members of the lower house from 596 to 450, with at least 112 seats reserved for women.

On 16 April 2019, Parliament approved changes to the constitution; 22 MPs voted against the changes, with another MP abstaining. The changes were required to be put to a referendum within 30 days.

== Campaign ==
The proposals were supported by Free Egyptians Party MP Mohamed Abu Hamed, who claimed el-Sisi needed more time in office to continue reforms.

Multiple political parties, including the Socialist Popular Alliance Party, the Egyptian Social Democratic Party, the Constitution Party, the Reform and Development Party, the Freedom Egypt Party, the Socialist Party of Egypt, the National Conciliation Party, the Conservative Party, and the Dignity Party (as well as MPs from the 25-30 Alliance), came together on 5 February 2019 to form the Union to Defend the Constitution, which launched a three-pronged campaign to defeat the amendments (gathering signatures, creating a "media platform" and opposing the amendments through the courts). Constitution Party member Khaled Dawoud claimed the proposals were a power-grab, while the Civil Democratic Movement has come out in opposition to the amendments. Other parties and organizations also opposing the amendments included the Arab Democratic Nasserist Party and the Revolutionary Socialists.

The International Commission of Jurists called for the changes to be rejected, noting that the change to article 140 on presidential term lengths violates the entrenched clause of article 226, forbidding changes to texts pertaining to presidential re-election, except with more guarantees.

A campaign named "Bātil" ("null and void") was launched the week of 7 April to oppose the proposed amendments. However, the campaign website was blocked on 9 April 2019 after gathering over 60,000 signatures against the changes; according to NetBlocks, the government subsequently blocked over 34,000 other domains in order to restrict access to the campaign site.

Opponents to the amendments faced government oppression according to Al-Monitor, which reported on a secretive grassroots group that hung banners and used graffiti to oppose the proposals.

In his reading of the proposed amendments, political analyst and columnist Maged Mandour concludes that the changes to the constitution "will re-draw the Egyptian political system and remove the last pretence of separation of powers or the subordination of the military to the elected government. Egypt is set to become a military dictatorship in name as well as deed."

== Conduct ==
A judge in charge of a polling station in Cairo laid out various issues regarding electoral conduct, including combining unregistered and registered voters' ballots, members of the pro-government Nation's Future Party at polling stations (and as poll workers), bribery with food and no oversight during the counting of ballots.

== Results ==
Choice	Votes	%
For	23,416,741	88.83
Against	2,945,680	11.17
Total	26,362,421	100.00
Valid votes	26,362,421	96.94
Invalid/blank votes	831,172	3.06
Total votes	27,193,593	100.00
Registered voters/turnout	61,344,503	44.33
Source: Ahram Online

== Reactions ==
Minutes after the results were announced, Sisi commented in a tweet, thanking the Egyptian people for voting "Yes": "Wonderful scene done by Egyptians who took part in the referendum, will be written down in our nation's historical record."

The New Arab reported: "Pro-government media, business people and lawmakers had pushed for a "Yes" vote and a high turnout, with many offering free rides and food handouts to voters, while authorities threatened to fine anyone boycotting the three-day referendum." Amnesty International and the International Commission of Jurists had previously urged the Egyptian government to withdraw the amendments, for they "would undermine judicial independence and expand military trials for civilians. If adopted, the amendments would weaken the rule of law, further erode fair trial guarantees and enshrine impunity for members of the Egyptian Armed Forces."

While National Election Authority chairman Lashin Ibrahim talked about "forces of darkness and evil" which boycotted the referendum in order "to destroy the democratic atmosphere in which it took place," prominent Egyptian writer Alaa Al-Aswany, in an opinion piece on Deutsche Welle Arabic, provided reasons for why the referendum was "void, unconstitutional and undemocratic, describing el-Sisi as a "military dictator (Arabic: ديكتاتور عسكري) exercising unprecedented repression upon people."

The BBC stated that the Egyptian authorities did not give the corporation accreditation to report on the vote.
