= National Salvation Front (Egypt) =

National Salvation Front جبهة الأنقاذ الوطني
- Leader: Amr Moussa; Hamdeen Sabahi; Mohamed ElBaradei
- Founded: 24 November 2012
- Headquarters: Cairo
- Ideology: Secularism
- Political position: Big tent
- Affiliated parties: more than 35

The National Salvation Front (also known as the National Front for Salvation of the Revolution or the National Rescue Front, Arabic: جبهة الإنقاذ الوطني) is an alliance of Egyptian political parties, formed to defeat Egyptian President Mohammed Morsi's 22 November 2012 constitutional declaration.

== History ==
The National Front for Salvation of the Revolution has more than 35 groups involved overall.

Observers are concerned that the NSF will not be able to become a coherent political force because the different parties agree on opposing Morsi, but their views on other subjects diverge.

The front issued three demands to Morsi during the 2012 Egyptian protests. The demands were: that the constitutional declaration be rescinded, that the referendum be called off, and that a new constituent assembly be formed.

Morsi announced that one decree, granting him unlimited power to make laws without judicial review, had been annulled as of 8 December 2012, but the constitutional referendum went ahead as planned for 15 and 22 December.

After the ouster of Morsi by the Egyptian military, a number of politicians from the National Salvation Front were moved into power, including three women.

The coalition held a meeting on 2 February 2014 to determine its future; it decided to continue its work. One commentator named Bassem Aly has stated that the alliance "collapsed" following the ouster of Morsi.

== Affiliated parties ==
The front is mainly secular and ranges from liberals to leftists. Some of them are as follows:

- Constitution Party
- Egyptian Popular Current
- Arab Democratic Nasserist Party
- Free Egypt Party
- Farmers General Syndicate
- National Association for Change
- Reform and Development Party
- Socialist Party of Egypt
- Social Peace Party
- Freedom Party
- Democratic Generation Party
- Freedom Egypt Party
- Egyptian Communist Party
- Free Egyptians Party
- New Wafd Party
- National Progressive Unionist Party
- Socialist Popular Alliance Party
- Conference Party
- Egyptian Social Democratic Party
- Dignity Party

=== Key figures ===
Key figures of the Front include Hamdeen Sabahi, Amr Moussa and Hussein Abdul Ghani. Sameh Ashour, another leading figure, is the spokesperson for the Front.

== Criticisms ==
The coalition was criticized by the student members of the Constitution Party, Socialist Popular Alliance, and the Egyptian Popular Current for having members of the former regime (known as feloul). They are pushing their parties to leave the coalition. Abdel Moneim Aboul Fotouh, the head of the Strong Egypt Party, said that he will not join the coalition because he would never join forces with former regime members. Akram Ismail, who is an activist and a former member of the Socialist Popular Alliance Party, argued the distinction between feloul and non-feloul did not matter, stating that "the battle now is between the oppressive Islamist alliance and the ascending democratic force".

Khaled Dawoud resigned as a spokesperson for the National Salvation Front on 16 August 2013 in protest at the support of police violence against Mohamed Morsi supporters by the NSF.
