= 2014 Egyptian constitutional referendum =

- 14–15 January 2014

Results
Choice	Votes	%
Yes	19,985,389	98.13%
No	381,341	1.87%
Valid votes	20,366,730	98.80%
Invalid or blank votes	246,947	1.20%
Total votes	20,613,677	100.00%
Registered voters/turnout	53,423,485	38.59%
- Results by Governorate

A constitutional referendum was held in Egypt on 14 and 15 January 2014, with Egyptians abroad voting between 8 and 12 January. The new constitution was approved by 98.1% of voters. Turnout was 38.6%.

== Background ==
President Mohamad Morsi was removed from power during the 2013 Egyptian coup d'état. The timetable established by interim president Adly Mansour envisioned a rapid transition, which initially entailed amending the suspended 2012 constitution.

The process of amending the 2012 constitution began with a committee of 10 legal experts. The draft amendments by the committee of 10 made many notable changes to the text of the 2012 constitution. The committee of 10 completed their work on 20 August 2013.

The second phase of the process included amendments by a committee of 50; those 50 people were announced on 1 September 2013. Amr Moussa was chosen as the chairman of the committee of 50 on 8 September 2013. The draft constitution was given to President Mansour on 3 December 2013.

== Campaign ==
=== Supporters ===
The Dignity Party backed the constitution. The Free Egyptians Party supported it. The Socialist Popular Alliance Party as well as the Socialist Party of Egypt also supported the constitution. The Popular Current had said that it supported the constitution. The Nour Party said it would support the constitution. Tamarod started a campaign on 5 December 2013 in support of the constitution. The Egyptian Trade Union Federation called on its supporters to vote for the constitution. The National Salvation Front said that it would call for a yes vote on the constitution. The Egyptian Social Democratic Party voted for the constitution.

=== Opponents ===
Khaled Ali, a former presidential candidate, was opposed to the constitution; he stated that it was "inappropriate" for Egypt. The Revolutionary Socialists also expressed their opposition to it. The Road of the Revolution Front announced on 8 January 2014 that it would vote against the constitution. The Freedom and Justice Party and the Islamic Bloc, which had won 65.3% of the vote in Egypt's parliamentary elections in 2011–2012, opposed the new Constitution and the referendum as being the fruits of an illegal military coup.

=== Boycotts ===
The Anti-Coup Alliance, which includes the Muslim Brotherhood-linked Freedom and Justice Party, announced on 22 December 2013 that it would boycott the vote. The Strong Egypt Party and the April 6 Youth Movement also indicated that they would boycott the vote. The Strong Egypt Party was initially going to mobilize for a "no" vote, but changed their stance after members of the party were arrested for having posters which supported the "no" campaign.

According to the official results, turnout was 38.9%. Turnout in the constitutional referendum of 2012 had been 32.9%.

== Conduct ==
Tamarod, the European Union and 27,000 observers were expected to monitor the referendum; judges affiliated with the Muslim Brotherhood were excluded from supervising polling stations.

According to Human Rights Watch, 11 people were killed in the clashes on 14 January 2014. However, according to the Health ministry, 8 people died in the first day of voting and two people died in the second day of voting.

In the weeks before the voting there were massive arrests of persons opposing the Constitution or the referendum.

== Results ==
Voter participation was about 38.6 percent according to Egyptian government figures that were challenged by the Muslim Brotherhood, which had called of a boycott because the vote was taking place after a military coup. There were almost 20 million total votes in favor. The vote was held with support for a "yes" vote by the Egyptian government and state media as well as a crackdown on those against it.

For comparison, about 16.7 million voters participated in the vote approving the constitution drafted under Morsi. This represented a turnout of 32.9 percent despite a boycott of the vote by non-Islamist factions. Of those that participated in that election, 63.8 percent voted for the Morsi-backed constitution, or about 10.65 million "yes" votes.

Choice	Votes	%
For	19,985,389	98.13
Against	381,341	1.87
Total	20,366,730	100.00
Valid votes	20,366,730	98.80
Invalid/blank votes	246,947	1.20
Total votes	20,613,677	100.00
Registered voters/turnout	53,423,485	38.59
Source: Al Ahram

=== By governorate ===
Turnout rate by governorate for the Egyptian constitutional referendum of 14–15 January 2014.

Governorate	Eligible voters	Voter turnout	Turnout %	Total votes	Valid votes	Invalid votes	"Yes" votes	"Yes" %	"No" votes	"No" %
Cairo	6,674,865	2,688,743	40.3%	2,791,233	2,762,952	28,281	2,720,162	98.5%	42,790	1.5%
Giza	4,518,941	1,450,195	32.1%	1,507,416	1,488,662	18,754	1,459,201	98.0%	29,461	2.0%
Dakahlia	3,793,080	1,876,901	49.5%	1,891,617	1,874,597	17,020	1,850,535	98.7%	24,062	1.3%
Sharqia	3,681,587	1,666,493	45.3%	1,691,360	1,673,968	17,392	1,646,736	98.4%	27,232	1.6%
Alexandria	3,415,629	1,308,971	38.3%	1,353,632	1,340,449	13,183	1,319,454	98.4%	20,995	1.6%
Beheira	3,376,941	1,260,624	37.3%	1,276,980	1,260,503	16,477	1,234,019	97.9%	26,484	2.1%
Gharbia	3,020,674	1,574,173	52.1%	1,586,496	1,572,176	14,320	1,551,093	98.7%	21,083	1.3%
Minya	2,808,534	734,512	26.2%	740,233	723,193	17,040	698,621	96.6%	24,572	3.4%
Qalyubia	2,718,798	1,204,971	44.3%	1,231,032	1,217,220	13,812	1,198,011	98.4%	19,209	1.6%
Sohag	2,485,950	592,391	23.8%	600,503	591,496	9,007	574,797	97.2%	16,699	2.8%
Monufia	2,298,208	1,226,154	53.4%	1,242,219	1,228,811	13,408	1,212,268	98.7%	16,543	1.3%
Asyut	2,219,387	538,873	24.3%	547,539	536,532	11,007	515,571	96.1%	20,961	3.9%
Kafr el-Sheikh	1,935,985	817,904	42.2%	823,516	815,038	8,478	803,940	98.6%	11,098	1.4%
Qena	1,676,423	400,668	23.9%	410,770	405,064	5,706	395,439	97.6%	9,625	2.4%
Faiyum	1,628,192	385,601	23.7%	391,609	383,384	8,225	370,802	96.7%	12,582	3.3%
Beni Suef	1,506,498	490,670	32.6%	496,172	486,360	9,812	469,974	96.6%	16,386	3.4%
Aswan	891,699	251,588	28.2%	257,563	254,088	3,475	248,571	97.8%	5,517	2.2%
Damietta	891,241	408,617	45.8%	415,825	411,233	4,592	404,687	98.4%	6,546	1.6%
Ismailia	735,103	290,689	39.5%	299,606	295,671	3,935	289,863	98.0%	5,808	2.0%
Luxor	703,670	215,668	30.6%	220,606	218,203	2,403	214,510	98.3%	3,693	1.7%
Port Said	453,377	231,439	51.0%	239,772	237,188	2,584	233,672	98.5%	3,516	1.5%
Suez	396,466	136,658	34.5%	144,919	143,284	1,635	140,167	97.8%	3,117	2.2%
Red Sea	244,603	77,681	31.8%	108,147	106,758	1,389	103,858	97.3%	2,900	2.7%
North Sinai	223,533	69,217	31.0%	75,968	74,557	1,411	72,161	96.8%	2,396	3.2%
Matruh	224,385	36,445	16.2%	44,725	43,910	815	42,242	96.2%	1,668	3.8%
New Valley	147,525	51,923	35.2%	52,877	51,769	1,108	49,920	96.4%	1,849	3.6%
South Sinai	70,845	23,804	33.6%	64,301	63,123	1,178	60,651	96.1%	2,472	3.9%

=== Reactions ===
- Russia - President Vladimir Putin was the first president to congratulate Egyptians on the constitution as he asked the new Egyptian ambassador in Russia to convey the best wishes to the Egyptian leadership saying: "We hope the Egyptian society will overcome current political and socio-economic difficulties and the country will return on the path of stability and growth."
- UAE - Abdullah bin Zayed Al Nahyan congratulated the Egyptian people saying: "The move is major milestone towards the roadmap for the future which will usher sisterly Egypt into the aspired stability and development."
- Iraq - Nouri Al-Maliki congratulated the Egyptian people saying that the overwhelming support for the constitution shown in polls reflects the Egyptian people's strong will to reject violence and terrorism and strive for peace, stability and freedom.

== See also ==
- Egyptian Constitution of 2014
