= Egyptian Constituent Assembly of 2012 =

Constituent Assembly of 2012 الجمعية التأسيسية al-Jamaaeya at-Ta’sīsīya

Type
- Type: Unicameral

History
- Founded: 26 March 2012
- Seats: 100

Elections
- Last election: 26 March 2012

The Egyptian Constituent Assembly of 2012 (CA) is the committee for the creation of a new Constitution of Egypt. The Muslim Brotherhood had announced that the Constituent Assembly would vote on the constitution on 29 November 2012. The Constituent Assembly will be able to avoid its possible dissolution by voting on the constitution earlier than the release of a ruling by the Supreme Constitutional Court on the assembly's legitimacy; the ruling was expected to occur on 2 December 2012. The court has postponed the verdict in response to protests. The Constituent Assembly approved the constitution on 29 November 2012; more than 16 hours were spent voting on its articles.

In a 31 March to 4 April opinion poll Al Ahram opinion poll, 82.3 percent of the 1200 respondents said they wanted the constituent assembly reformed, to represent all political forces, while 17.7 percent expressed contentment with the current composition. The Supreme Constitutional Court is expected to continue proceedings on the legitimacy of the assembly on 3 February 2013. The lawsuits on the legitimacy of the assembly have been dismissed on 3 March 2013. The Administrative Judiciary Court dismissed more lawsuits on 28 May 2013. The High Constitutional Court ruled that the Constituent Assembly was unconstitutional on 2 June 2013; the Administrative Court is expected to eventually rule on the constitution.

== First Constituent Assembly ==
Egypt's first Constituent Assembly, elected by the Islamist-led parliament, was criticized by many observers due to the preponderance of Islamist members (66 out of 100) it contained: 38 out of the 50 parliamentary members of the constituent assembly were members of the Muslim Brotherhood's Freedom and Justice Party (part of the Democratic Alliance) and of the Salafi Al Nour Party (part of the Islamist Bloc). There were only 6 women and only 5 Copts (part of Egypt's Christian minority) out of 100 members in the constituent assembly.

Out of its 100 elected members, only 75 attend the assembly. Many of the liberal, leftist and social democratic parties like the Free Egyptians Party, the Socialist Popular Alliance, the Dignity Party, the Social Democrats, the Tagammo Party and the Freedom Egypt Party boycotted the election to determine the makeup of the Constituent Assembly because they saw it as an Islamist attempt to strengthen their power. After the election in 2012, most of them also withdrew from the constituent assembly itself. The liberal New Wafd Party also participated in the boycott.

The first Constituent Assembly was then dissolved when a court rendered it unconstitutional in April 2012. The Supreme Administrative Court had dissolved it in April for including members of parliament in its membership. The court said that according to the March 2011 Constitutional Decree, MPs were responsible for electing the Constituent Assembly, but could not elect themselves. On 10 April, Cairo's administrative court suspended the assembly, judging that the assembly was "unrepresentative" for involving too few women, young people and minority representatives. Liberals and secularists had filed a suit out of fear the constitutional panel could implement a strong role for Islamic religious law in the new constitution.

== Second Constituent Assembly ==
An agreement to form a more balanced assembly was reached on 7 June 2012. 39 seats would be filled by Members of Parliament, six by judges, nine by law experts, one each by a member of the armed forces, the police and the justice ministry, 13 seats by unions, and 21 by public figures. Five seats would be filled by the Al-Azhar University, one of Sunni Islam's most important institutions, and four by the Coptic Orthodox Church. A satisfactory deal was thus reached between Islamist and non-Islamist parties over the membership ratio, but the non-Islamist figures accused their Islamist counterparts of breaking the deal and attempting to secure a voting majority of Islamists once again in the assembly.

MPs then elected a second Assembly, but this one also included parliamentarians, which is why the Assembly faces another court case. The Constituent Assembly however has been given a second chance after the Supreme Administrative Court postponed on 26 June 2012 a decision on dissolving it to 4 September. It can conceivably now finish drafting the constitution before that date rendering a dissolution ruling moot.

However, as per the supplementary constitutional decree released in June 2012 by the ruling Supreme Council of the Armed Forces, the Constituent Assembly still faces difficulty. The decree gives several parties, including the head of SCAF, the right to veto any clause the assembly drafts if it conflicts with the "goals of the revolution" or constitutional principles from Egypt's previous constitutions. If the assembly overturns the veto, the issue is referred to the Supreme Constitutional Court for deliberation. If the assembly does not finish drafting the constitution in time for the court date and is dissolved, then according to article 60 B of the decree, SCAF gets to appoint another assembly.

According to the Carnegie Endowment for International Peace, a lawsuit has been filed against the second assembly on the grounds that members of the parliament voted some of their own members into the body. Nathan J. Brown of the Carnegie Endowment for International Peace noted: "Although that might sound normal and innocuous, the first assembly was disbanded on the basis of a similar argument."

A ruling on the dissolution of the Constituent Assembly by the Administrative Court in Cairo was postponed until 9 October 2012 to allow the judges to look into documents regarding the case. The hearing was adjourned until 16 October. The Cairo Administrative Court would give its verdict on the legality of the Constituent Assembly on 23 October. The Supreme Administrative Court referred the lawsuit to the High Constitutional Court. This might give the Constituent Assembly enough time to finish drafting the constitution. Mohamed Morsi's constitutional declaration issued in November 2012 bars the Constituent Assembly from being dissolved by the judiciary.

=== Boycott ===
A number of parties have embraced Mohamed ElBaradei's and Hamdeen Sabbahi's calls for a boycott of the Constituent Assembly. The parties and organizations that have signed a statement calling for a boycott include "the Nasserist Party, Karama Party, the Constitution Party, the Egyptian Democratic Party, the Socialist Popular Alliance, the Free Egyptian Party, the pro-democracy Kefaya Movement, the Egyptian Socialist Party, and the Revolutionary Democratic Coalition". Mohamed Ghonim, the coordinator of Egyptian Popular Current and liberal Amr Hamzawi have also signed the statement calling for a boycott.

A number of activists, public figures and politicians announced during a press conference on Wednesday 3 October 2012 that they do not recognize the constitution as it is currently being written by the Constituent Assembly and instead seek to draft a constitution that is built upon popular consensus. The name of the group is the Egyptian Constitutional Front.

=== Withdrawals ===
The constituent assembly had a number of groups and individuals withdrawing from it as of November 2012.

Numerous church representatives withdrew from the Constituent Assembly on 17 November 2012. The church representatives that withdrew from the Constituent Assembly included Bishop Paula of Tanta of the Coptic Orthodox Church, Bishop Yohana Qalta, who is the Assistant to the Catholic Patriarch in Egypt and Safwat al-Bayadi, who is the head of the Anglican Communion in Egypt. The acting Coptic Pope "wanted to withdraw from the assembly to make sure the church's stand was known and that officials knew the Coptic Church would not allow such a narrow-minded constitution to be drafted with its name on it." The New Wafd Party withdrew its representatives on 17 November 2012.

Ahmed Maher, a member of the April 6 Youth Movement, withdrew on 18 November 2012. Mohamed Anwar Esmat Sadat, the leader of the Reform and Development Party, also withdrew on the same day. This was followed by former secretary of the Arab League Amr Moussa, Hamdy Kandeel, and Wahid Abdel Meguid's withdrawal.

The Journalists Syndicate Council and the representative of Farmers Syndicate, Mohamed Abdel-Qader, withdrew on Tuesday, 20 November 2012.

The number of withdrawals from the Constituent Assembly would have made it impossible for there to be the quorum necessary to send the constitution to a popular vote, as required by the rules of the Constituent Assembly. The Constituent Assembly has 85 members voting on the constitution, with 11 liberal members replaced with alternates. Thus, there were enough members to achieve the required 67 votes for passage.

The remaining members of the assembly said they would resume their work. It was reported that there were at least 40 withdrawals overall from the Constituent Assembly.

=== Party standings ===
The party standings were as follows:

Standings in the 2012 Egyptian Constituent Assembly
Affiliation	Members	
Affiliation	2012 election results	As of 9 June 2012
Freedom and Justice Party		16
Al-Nour Party		8
New Wafd Party		5
Egyptian Social Democratic Party		2
Free Egyptians Party		2
Building and Development Party		1
Al-Wasat Party		1
Reform and Development Party		1
Socialist Popular Alliance Party		1
Dignity Party		1
Independents		61
Total members	100	
vacant	0	
Total seats	100	
