= Nation Alliance (Egypt) =

Defunct Egyptian electoral alliance

- Founded: March 2013
- Ideology: Islamism; Salafism; Factions: Religious conservatism Economic populism Mixed economy
- Political position: Far-right
- Religion: Islam

The Nation Alliance was an Islamist electoral alliance in Egypt.

== History ==
Several of the involved parties had formed the Free Nation Coalition in January 2013, including the Homeland Party, as well as the Building and Development Party, the Authenticity Party and the Flag Party, headed by Salafi preacher Hazem Salah Abu Ismail.

== Affiliated parties ==
- Flag Party
- Egyptian Reform Party
- Authenticity Party
- People Party
- Islamic Party
- Virtue Party
- New Labour Party
