= Civil Democratic Current =

- Founded: 2014
- Ideology: Secularism
- Political position: Centre-left
- House of Representatives: 0 / 568

The Civil Democratic Current (also called the Democratic Alliance for Civil Forces and the Democratic Civilian Alliance) was an alliance of political parties that would have run for the 2015 Egyptian parliamentary election, but it withdrew. The alliance worked with other parties, including the Egyptian Wafd Party, to attempt to amend the current parliamentary election law, which limits the number of party list seats to 120 of 567 total seats.

The alliance intended to form a "united national front" with more parties in preparation for the 2018 presidential election.

The alliance seems to be replaced by the similarly named Civil Democratic Movement (2017). The active alliance includes various parties that were also involved in this alliance; namely, the Constitution Party, the Dignity Party, Socialist Popular Alliance Party, Egyptian Social Democratic Party and the Bread and Freedom Party.

== Affiliated parties ==
- Dignity Party
- Constitution Party
- Socialist Popular Alliance Party
- Freedom Egypt Party
- Popular Current Party
- Bread and Freedom Party
- Socialist Party of Egypt
- Egyptian Social Democratic Party
