= 2012 Egyptian constitutional referendum =

- 13–22 December 2012

Results
Choice	Votes	%
Yes	10,693,911	63.83%
No	6,061,011	36.17%
Valid votes	16,754,922	98.22%
Invalid or blank votes	303,395	1.78%
Total votes	17,058,317	100.00%
Registered voters/turnout	51,919,067	32.86%
- Results by governorate Yes: 50–60% 60-70% 70–80% 80–90% 90–100% No: 50-60%

A constitutional referendum was held in Egypt in two rounds on 15 and 22 December 2012. Egyptians living abroad were scheduled to vote between 8 and 11 December. Voting for expatriates had been delayed until 12 December 2012 and was extended until 17 December 2012. Voters were asked whether they approve of the draft constitution that was approved by the Constituent Assembly on 30 November 2012.

Unofficial results reported on 23 December 2012 found that 32.9% of the electorate voted and that the constitution was approved with 63.8% of the vote in favor over the two rounds of polling.

During the campaign, supporters of the draft constitution argued that the constitution would provide stability. Most opponents argued that the constitution was too favorable to the Muslim Brotherhood, and did not grant sufficient minority rights. However, some extreme Salafists also opposed the constitution, arguing that it should have been based more closely on Sharia law.

The supreme committee for supervising the constitution referendum was formed on 3 December 2012. Mohammad Salim Al-Awa stated that a new Constituent Assembly would be formed within three months through general elections if the draft Constitution was voted down. The new assembly would have six months to write the new constitution. The general secretary of the constitution referendum supreme committee resigned for health reasons.

== Background ==
The Constituent Assembly was originally elected by Parliament in March 2012, before being dissolved by a court in April after it was deemed unconstitutional. A second Assembly was elected by Parliament during the summer. The second Constituent Assembly produced on 30 November 2012 a 234-article draft constitution, after it approved each article individually during a 19-hour meeting starting on 29 November.

=== Judicial response ===
Egyptian Judges Club members agreed to boycott the referendum. However the decisions of the club are non-binding on its members. Judge Mohamed Awad, who is a member of the Judges for Egypt reform movement, said that 90 percent of judges would monitor the referendum. Mohamed Gadallah, the legal adviser to the Egyptian president, stated that Egypt's Supreme Judicial Council would oversee the referendum. The judges that were on strike responded that the Supreme Judicial Council decision was not final and that judges could individually refuse to participate.

== Contents ==
The draft constitution ended Egypt's all-powerful presidency, instituted a stronger parliament, and contained provisions against torture or detention without trial. But it also gave Egypt's generals much of the power and privilege they had during the Hosni Mubarak era. Human Rights Watch noted that it provided for basic protections against arbitrary detention and torture and for some economic rights, but failed to end military trials of civilians or to protect freedom of expression and religion. The organization also stated that the Chapter II draft, entitled Rights and Freedoms, provided for strong protection against arbitrary detention in article 35 and torture and inhumane treatment in article 36, and for freedom of movement in article 42, privacy of communication in article 38, freedom of assembly in article 50, and of association in article 51, but deferred to objections from the country's military leadership and removed the clear prohibition of trials of civilians before military courts.

Article 2, defining the relationship between Islam and Egyptian law, remained essentially unchanged from Egypt's old constitution. The new charter said that the legal code stems from "the principles of Islamic law," wording that is broad enough to allow for individual rights and freedoms. But in an attempted compromise between the ultraconservatives and their liberal opponents, the proposed constitution added a new article defining those principles in accordance with established schools of Sunni Muslim thought.

Article 50 preserved the right to assembly but required "notification" of such gatherings. The constitution called for freedom from discrimination, but did not specify whether women or religious minorities were protected. A provision on women's equality was left out to avoid a dispute after ultraconservatives insisted that women's equality should be qualified by compliance with religious laws. One article that passed pertained to arbitrary arrest and detention rights. The article said that no person may be "arrested, searched, incarcerated, deprived of freedom in any way and/or confined" unless it is ordered by a "competent judge". Another article stipulated that anyone jailed must be told why in writing within 12 hours, and the case must go to investigators within 24 hours. Detainees cannot be interrogated without their attorney or one appointed to them being present, the article also stated. Phone conversations, electronic correspondence and other communication cannot be listened to without a warrant.

The new constitution limited the President to two four-year terms, marking a clear shift away from the era of Mubarak, who ruled for 30 years. But other checks on presidential power remained ill-defined. The defense minister would be chosen from the military's officers. Insulating the armed forces from parliamentary oversight, a special council that included military officers would oversee military affairs and the defense budget. Ziad al-Ali of the International Institute for Democratic and Electoral Assistance noted that another article in the document called for the election of local councils in each province but kept all the power in the hands of federally appointed governors. And even though Egypt's pervasive public corruption was a major complaint by those who forced Hosni Mubarak from power, the assembly declined to borrow any international models to promote transparency, Ali said. "There won't be a huge improvement in the way government works and the way services are delivered, and that is a setback for democracy."

== Campaign ==
=== Supporters ===
The Al Nour Party and the Building and Development Party supported the draft constitution because it would provide stability. Workers unions, many of which are dominated by the Muslim Brotherhood, have stated that they support the draft constitution. Mohamed Mostafa, the spokesperson of Al-Azhar, is in favor of the draft constitution. The Safety and Development Party accused the judges who were boycotting the referendum of undermining stability. The Freedom and Justice Party launched a campaign urging a yes vote on the draft constitution.

=== Opponents ===
Women's rights activists opposed the draft constitution on the grounds that the exclusion of explicit women's rights in the draft constitution opened the door to changes in women's rights. The People's Representatives Coalition opposed the draft constitution, launching an awareness campaign entitled "Reject your constitution". The Salafi Jihadi Movement boycotted the draft constitution because it "does not apply Islamic Sharia". They stated that they were trying to convince other Islamists, such as the Muslim Brotherhood, to vote no on the draft constitution as well.

The National Salvation Front called for a no vote on the draft constitution. They put forth a number of conditions, which included: free and fair elections, holding the vote on one day, supervision of the vote, protection for polling places, and immediate announcement of voting results at polling places. If the demands were not met, they asked voters to vote no. Baha'a Anwar, a spokesperson for the Shi'a in Egypt, stated that Shi'a would not take part in the referendum. Sufi Sheikh Aboul Azayem opposed the draft constitution, arguing that it was only favorable towards the Muslim Brotherhood. Egyptian journalists opposed the draft constitution because they believed it would limit freedom of expression.

The Strong Egypt Party announced that it would launch a no vote campaign on the draft constitution. The Egyptian Current Party has asked voters to vote no on the constitution. The Egyptian Popular Current announced it would vote no on the constitution. The Egyptian Social Democratic Party said the same. The Constitution Party also encouraged a no vote on the draft constitution. The Free Egyptians Party boycotted the vote.

The Hazemoun movement, made up of followers of Hazem Salah Abu Ismail, a Salafi preacher, came out against the draft constitution. The Salafi Front also opposed the draft constitution, arguing that the constitution should have made Sharia itself the main source of legislation, not the principles. They also argued that Christians and Jews should be governed by Islamic law and that the constitution should have stated that "divine authority" is the source of power not the people. In addition, Coptic Christians also opposed the draft constitution, walking out of the constitution drafting session and prompting Khaled Dawoud, a spokesman of National Salvation Front, to state, "this is probably the first time in our history that the Christians were not present in writing the constitution".

== Results ==
Choice	Votes	%
For	10,693,911	63.83
Against	6,061,011	36.17
Total	16,754,922	100.00
Valid votes	16,754,922	98.22
Invalid/blank votes	303,395	1.78
Total votes	17,058,317	100.00
Registered voters/turnout	51,919,067	32.86
Source: Egypt Independent

=== By governorate ===
Governorate	Registered voters	Turnout	Total votes	Valid votes	Invalid votes	For		Against	
Governorate	Registered voters	Turnout	Total votes	Valid votes	Invalid votes	Votes	%	Votes	%
Cairo	6,580,478	34.8	2,291,040	2,254,698	36,342	974,371	43.2	1,280,327	56.8
Giza	4,383,701	34.6	1,517,197	1,493,092	24,105	995,417	66.7	497,675	33.3
Dakahlia	3,719,758	31.5	1,171,143	1,150,130	21,013	631,219	54.9	518,911	45.1
Sharqia	3,565,351	32.0	1,141,471	1,120,328	21,143	737,503	65.8	382,825	34.2
Alexandria	3,347,770	36.2	1,210,574	1,193,691	16,883	663,975	55.6	529,716	44.4
Beheira	3,276,930	33.7	1,084,443	1,084,442	1	818,755	75.5	265,687	24.5
Gharbia	2,948,656	33.9	999,093	980,497	18,596	468,488	47.8	512,009	52.2
Minya	2,718,947	34.5	939,259	916,094	23,165	760,704	83	155,390	17
Qalyubia	2,639,808	32.9	868,349	853,125	15,224	512,055	60	341,070	40
Sohag	2,393,672	25.4	606,866	593,546	13,320	467,029	78.7	126,517	21.3
Monufia	2,236,898	34.0	760,324	745,373	14,951	364,374	48.9	380,999	51.1
Asyut	2,127,688	28.0	595,883	581,707	14,176	442,506	76.1	139,201	23.9
Kafr el-Sheikh	1,886,212	29.6	557,546	548,554	8,992	360,994	65.8	187,560	34.2
Qena	1,629,713	22.8	371,252	364,509	6,743	307,839	84.5	56,670	15.5
Faiyum	1,579,694	35.2	556,550	544,109	12,441	486,890	89.5	57,219	10.5
Beni Suef	1,454,278	38.7	562,991	549,937	13,054	466,248	84.8	83,689	15.2
Aswan	872,740	22.7	198,107	194,416	3,691	149,020	76.7	45,396	23.3
Damietta	868,773	37.2	323,298	318,944	4,354	205,378	64.4	113,566	35.6
Ismailia	713,963	36.4	259,645	256,210	3,435	179,235	70	76,975	30
Luxor	685,009	26.0	1781,32	174,620	3,512	133,779	76.6	40,841	23.4
Port Said	445,322	38.0	169,229	166,931	2,298	85,353	51.1	81,578	48.9
Suez	387,522	38.7	149,783	147,903	1,880	104,061	70.4	43,842	29.6
Red Sea	232,388	30.7	71,273	70,432	841	44,116	62.6	26,316	37.4
North Sinai	215,618	30.6	65,913	64,964	949	50,726	78.1	14,238	21.9
Matruh	212,495	36.5	77,493	76,630	863	70,237	91.7	6,393	8.3
New Valley	143,584	32.9	48,440	47,775	665	41,728	87.3	6,047	12.7
South Sinai	65,407	29.6	19,351	19,023	328	12,157	63.8	6,866	36.2
Source: National Elections Authority

== Reactions ==
After the referendum, President Mohamed Morsi said in a speech on television that the Egyptians voting against the constitutional referendum were within their rights, "because Egypt of the revolution – Egypt's people and its elected president – can never feel annoyed by the active patriotic opposition. We don't want to go back to the era of the one opinion and fabricated fake majorities." With regard to the referendum, Morsi went on to add that "there have been mistakes here and there, and I bear responsibility", but that "no matter what the hardships of the past [were], I see it as the pain of birthing the new Egypt ... It is truly the dawn of [a] new Egypt, which has risen and is now shining."

In a response to the referendum, the United States Department of State issued a statement noting that "[m]any Egyptians have voiced deep concerns about the substance of the constitution and the constitutional process" and further stating that "President Morsi, as the democratically elected leader of Egypt, has a special responsibility to move forward in a way that recognizes the urgent need to bridge divisions, build trust, and broaden support for the political process."
