= Civil Democratic Movement (2012) =

Defunct Egyptian electoral alliance

- Founded: October 2012
- Ideology: Secularism

The Civil Democratic Movement or Democratic Civil Current or Democratic Civilian Current was a coalition aimed at "establish[ing] a civil force to counter the control of the Muslim Brotherhood and religious movements on the entirety of state institutions". The coalition reportedly had 29 political parties and movements involved in it.

== Formerly affiliated parties ==
- Arab Democratic Nasserist Party
- Democratic Front Party
- Egyptian Citizen Party
- Egyptian Communist Party
- Egyptian Green Party
- Free Egyptians Party
- Freedom Egypt Party
- Freedom Party
- Ghad El-Thawra Party
- Liberal Constitutional Party
- Liberals Party
- Life of the Egyptians Party
- New Wafd Party
- Socialist Popular Alliance Party
- Young Egypt Party
