= 2007 Egyptian Shura Council election =

Elections for the Shura Council were held in Egypt on 11 and 18 June 2007. From a total of 264 seats in the Shura Council, the upper house of the Egyptian parliament, 88 are for election every three years.

== Campaign ==
There were 587 candidates competing for the 88 seats in 24 provinces. The main parties running were the National Democratic Party (109 candidates) and the outlawed Muslim Brotherhood (whose 19 candidates were standing as independents, President Mubarak having had failed in an attempt to disqualify 17 of them). The elections were being boycotted by the New Wafd Party and the Nasserist Party.

== Conduct ==
Violence on election day led to the death of a supporter of an independent candidate in Sharqia province after fighting with supporters of the NDP.

== Results ==
Egyptian media reported that 11 of the 88 seats were won uncontested by the National Democratic Party. In total, the NDP won 70 seats in the first round of the election, while one seat went to the National Progressive Unionist Party (commonly known as "Tagammu"). Voter turnout was reportedly 23%. The NDP won all 17 seats determined in the second round.

Party	Seats				
Party	First round	Second round	Not up	Nominated	Total
National Democratic Party	70	17	85	73	245
National Progressive Unionist Party	1	0	2	1	3
New Wafd Party	0	0	0	2	2
Free Social Constitutional Party	0	0	0	1	1
Democratic Front Party	0	0	0	1	1
Democratic Generation Party	0	0	0	1	1
Egyptian Green Party	0	0	0	1	1
Solidarity Party	0	0	0	1	1
Independents	0	0	2	7	9
Total	71	17	89	88	264
Source: IPU
