= Coalition for the Defense of Sharia =

- Leader: Yehia al-Shebainy
- Ideology: Islamism; Social conservatism Religious conservatism Factions: Mixed economy Salafism; Wahhabism; Madkhalism; Economic liberalism Conservatism; Economic populism
- Political position: Right-wing to far-right

The Coalition for the Defense of Sharia, which is also known as the Get United Coalition, and the Islamic Sharia Application Coalition was an Islamist political alliance in Egypt designed to ensure the development of a constitution that is compatible with Sharia. The coalition reportedly included 30 political parties and movements altogether. Another article by the Egypt Independent states that there were 13 parties and groups involved.

== Affiliated parties ==
- Freedom and Justice Party
- Al-Nour Party
- Islamic Party
- Building and Development Party
- Authenticity Party
- People Party
- Independent Azharite conservative front
- Azhar Scholars Front
- Egyptian Reform Party
