= Democratic Alliance for Egypt =

Defunct Egyptian electoral alliance

The Democratic Alliance for Egypt التحالف الديمقراطي من أجل مصر
- Founded: 2011
- Ideology: Big tent Factions: Liberalism; Economic liberalism Islamic liberalism Liberal democracy Nasserism; Arab socialism Islamic socialism Islamism; Salafism; Secularism; Social conservatism Religious conservatism Mixed economy Reformism
- Political position: Left-wing to right-wing

Democratic Alliance for Egypt, or Democratic Alliance, was a coalition of political parties in Egypt, formed in the wake of the 2011 Egyptian Revolution that competed in the 2011–12 Egyptian parliamentary election. The largest party in the group was the Muslim Brotherhood's Freedom and Justice Party.

== Affiliated parties ==
- Democratic Generation Party
- Egyptian Arab Socialist Party
- Ghad El-Thawra Party
- Dignity Party
- Labour Party
- Ahrar Party
- Egyptian Reform Party
- Reform and Renaissance Party
- Freedom and Justice Party
- Safety and Development Party

== History ==
The alliance was originally made of fifteen parties, including Freedom Egypt Party, the leftist National Progressive Unionist Party (Tagammu), the Salafi-affiliated Al-Nour Party, the centrist Justice Party as well as the Al-Wasat Party and the Arab Democratic Nasserist Party. The alliance also included the Salafi Virtue Party, Salafi Authenticity Party and the Building and Development Party. Later the Democratic Front Party and Tagammu parties split off to join the left-leaning Egyptian Bloc. The Al-Nour and Authenticity parties formed a new Salafi alliance in October. The Building and Development Party joined the list, called the Islamist Bloc, in November.

By the start of the elections on 28 November 2011, only 11 parties remained in the alliance, including the Muslim Brotherhood's Freedom and Justice Party, the Nasserist Karama Party (Dignity), the Ghad El-Thawra Party, the Labor Party, the Ahrar Party, the Egyptian Arab Socialist Party, the Democratic Generation Party and several smaller parties. The parties differ on domestic policies but are united in supporting a more nationalistic, less Israel-friendly foreign policy.

The Democratic Alliance coalition is effectively defunct. The Freedom and Justice Party will not run under the Democratic Alliance coalition. The Ghad El-Thawra Party is now part of the Conference Party. The Dignity Party has joined the National Salvation Front (NSF). In preparation for the 2013 Egyptian parliamentary election, the Civilization Party will join the Centrist Coalition, and the Democratic Generation Party will join the NSF.

== Results of the parliamentary elections ==
In the 2011/2012 parliamentary elections, the Democratic Alliance won 10,138,134 votes out of 27,065,135 correct votes, or roughly 37.5% of all votes. The Alliance thus received 127 seats out of 332 in the Egyptian Parliament. The 127 seats were divided between members of the alliance as follows:

- Freedom and Justice Party: 116 seats
- Dignity Party: 6 seats
- Ghad El-Thawra Party: 2 seats
- Civilization Party: 2 seats
- Egyptian Islamic Labour Party: 1 seat

In addition, independent candidates of the Freedom and Justice Party won 101 seats out of the 168 seats allocated for independent candidates.

Thus, the Democratic Alliance won a total of 228 seats out of 498 (45.8%) in the 2012 Egyptian Parliament, thus becoming the largest political bloc in the parliament.

== See also ==
- List of political parties in Egypt
