= Islamist Coalition =

Defunct Egyptian electoral alliance

- Founded: February 2013
- Ideology: Islamism; Factions: Salafism; Conservatism; Religious conservatism Mixed economy Economic liberalism Economic populism
- Political position: Center-right
- Religion: Islam

A defunct Islamist Coalition was formed in February 2013 by hardline Islamist parties in Egypt.

== Formerly affiliated parties ==
- Islamic Party
- Building and Development Party
- Egyptian Nation Party
- People Party
- Hazemon
