= Social Justice Coalition (2012) =

Defunct Egyptian electoral alliance

- Leader: Hussein Abdel-Ghani
- Ideology: Big tent Factions: Liberalism; Social liberalism Social democracy Democratic socialism Secularism
- Political position: Center-left to left-wing

The Social Justice Coalition was an electoral alliance in Egypt. It was formed by Hussein Abdel-Ghani.

== Formerly affiliated parties ==
- Egyptian Social Democratic Party
- Socialist Party of Egypt
- Socialist Popular Alliance Party
- Constitution Party
