= Salafist Front =

Egyptian Salafist organization

The Salafist Front is an Egyptian Salafi Islamist organization that was founded after the 2011 Egyptian revolution after breaking away from the Salafist Call. It has been called "one of the largest Salafist associations in the Middle East". The organization was part of the Anti-Coup Alliance, though it announced on 4 December 2014 that it had withdrawn from the alliance. It has also been described as one of the most revolutionary Islamist movements in Egypt.

The spokesperson of the front, Khaled Saeed, was a member of the Virtue Party. The Salafist Front backed Hazem Salah Abu Ismail in the 2012 presidential election in Egypt. The organization launched the People Party in 2012.

The front has called for protests on 28 November 2014. Several Islamist parties (including the Building and Development Party, the Al-Wasat Party and the Homeland Party) have criticized the calls for revolution. Other Islamist groups including the Virtue Party, Hizb ut-Tahrir, the Flag Party and the Muslim Brotherhood have expressed support for the protests. The turnout for the protests was relatively small. The organization stated that it was "let down" by other Islamic groups.

== See also ==
- Salafist Call
