= Nation Alliance =

Nation Alliance may refer to:

- Egyptian Nation Alliance, Egyptian electoral alliance established in 2012
- Nation Alliance (Egypt), Egyptian electoral alliance established in 2013
- Nation Alliance Party, former Canadian political party
- Nation Alliance (Turkey), Turkish electoral alliance

== See also ==
- National Alliance (disambiguation)
