= Free Egyptians Party =

Free Egyptians Party حزب المصريين الأحرار
- Chairman: Essam Khalil
- Secretary-General: Nader El Sharkawy (Acting); Ahmed Kahiry; Essam Khalil
- Founder: Naguib Sawiris
- Founded: 3 April 2011
- Headquarters: 2 Hassan Sabry Street Zamalek, Cairo
- Membership (2011): 100,000
- Ideology: Liberalism (Egyptian); Secularism
- Political position: Centre to centre-right
- National affiliation: For the Love of Egypt (2015–2018); National Unified List for Egypt (2020)
- Regional affiliation: Arab Liberal Federation
- Colors: Red
- Slogan: Party For All Egyptians حزب لكل المصريين
- House of Representatives: 0 / 596
- Senate: 0 / 300

Website
- www.almasreyeenelahrar.com

The Free Egyptians Party (Arabic: حزب المصريين الأحرار, romanized: Ḥizb El Maṣrīyīn El Aḥrār [ħezb el mɑsˤrɪjˈjiːn el ʔɑħˈrɑːr]) is an Egyptian liberal party, founded after the 2011 Egyptian revolution. It supports the principles of a liberal, democratic, and secular political order in Egypt. The Free Egyptians Party was the largest party in the House of Representatives following the 2015 Egyptian parliamentary election. The party is a founding member of Al Hurriya Liberal Network.

== History ==
=== Establishment ===
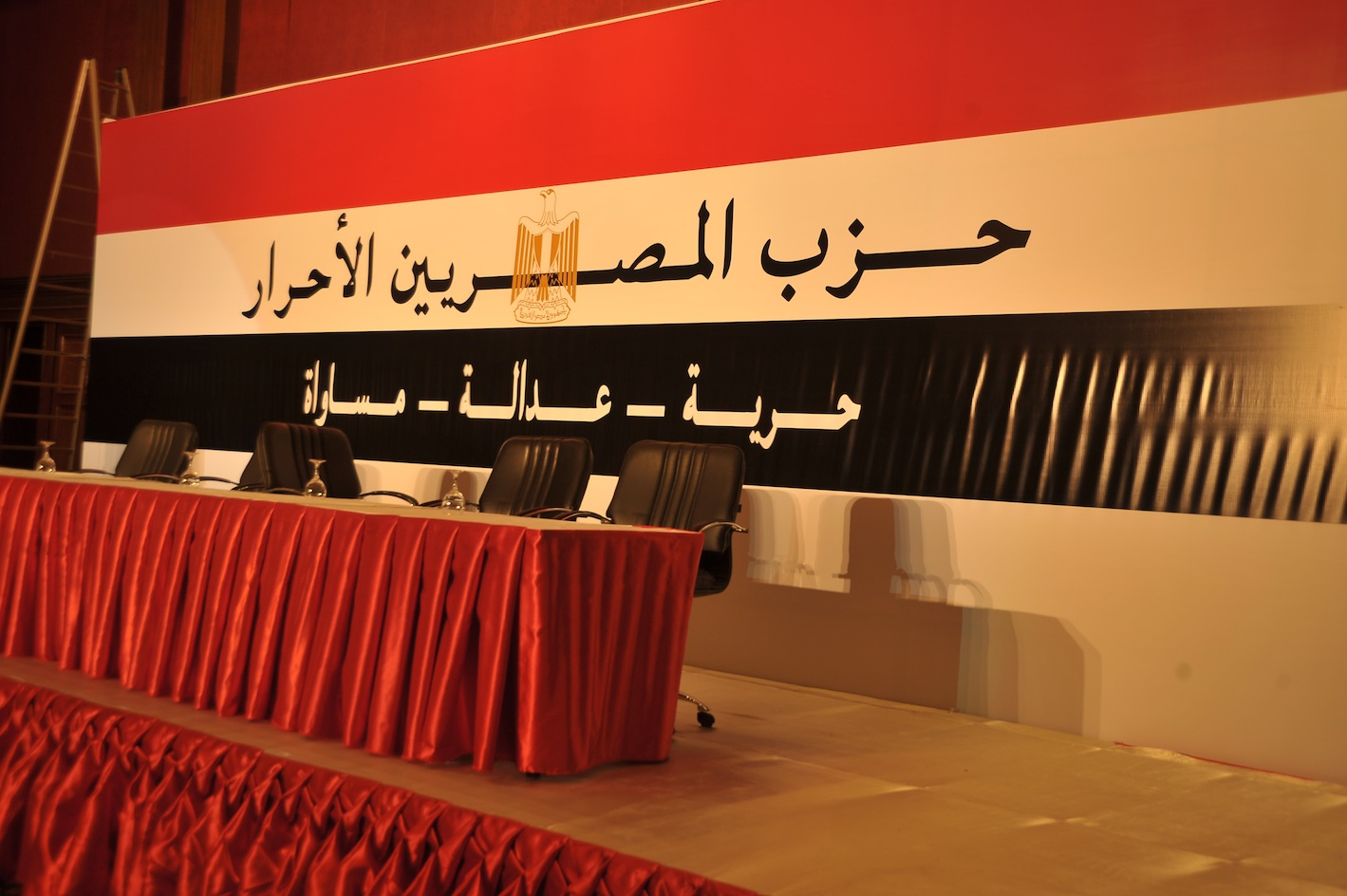
The party's first annual conference in 2011.

On 3 April 2011, the engineer and businessman Naguib Sawiris, and a group of intellectuals and political activists announced the establishment of the party and declared the program, the objectives and the basic principles of the party. Other prominent party members include the Egyptian American scientist Farouk El-Baz, the Egyptian Arabic poet Ahmed Fouad Negm, the writer Gamal El-Ghitani, and the telecommunications entrepreneur Khaled Bichara.

In July 2011, infighting emerged within the party. An internal faction called the "Group of 17" accused the national leadership of undemocratic methods in choosing local leaders in the Damietta Governorate and of tolerating former members of the National Democratic Party, the ruling party of the toppled Mubarak regime, within the ranks of the Free Egyptians Party. Five of the dissidents have been excluded from the party, and have been denoted as "troublemakers" by party officials. Nevertheless, in August of the same year, the new party reported to have 100,000 members.

=== Egyptian Bloc and elections of 2011/2012 ===
The Free Egyptians Party was an integral component of the Egyptian Bloc, a broad electoral alliance opposing the Muslim Brotherhood, founded on 16 August 2011. The Egyptian Bloc has taken up the cause of defending Egypt's secularity and civic society. However, several member parties, including the Socialist Popular Alliance Party and the Socialist Party of Egypt, left the Egyptian Bloc, complaining that it included "remnants of the former regime".

The Bloc only included the Free Egyptians Party, the Egyptian Social Democratic Party (ESDP), and Tagammu when the first post-revolutionary parliamentary elections were held in November 2011 and January 2012. Together, the Bloc won 2,402,238 votes, corresponding to a share of 8.9%. Of the 332 seats allocated to parties and coalitions, 33 were taken by candidates of the Egyptian Bloc, 14 of which were members of the Free Egyptians Party. One FEP member was elected to one of the 166 seats reserved for individual candidates.

Unlike its partners ESDP and Tagammu, the Free Egyptians Party decided to boycott the Shura council elections in January and February 2012, citing the reluctance of authorities to address irregularities during the lower house elections. After the elections, the Egyptian Bloc collapsed with the ESDP retiring, claiming that the other partners were more concerned over the secular-Islamist divide than over the differences between the former regime and the forces of the revolution. In March 2012, former deputy chairman and member of parliament Mohamed Abu Hamed resigned from the party to become a leader of the Life of the Egyptians Party and later of the Egyptian Patriotic Movement.

=== Opposition against the Islamist government ===
The Free Egyptians did not take part in the selection of members of the Constituent Assembly in June 2012, lamenting an over-representation of Islamists in it. It confirmed its calls to boycott the assembly in September 2012. Instead, the FEP participated in a number of projects trying to coordinate the secular opposition against the Islamist majority that came out of the election, namely the Egyptian Nation Alliance that was announced in September 2012, the Civil Democratic Movement of October 2012, and the National Salvation Front founded in November 2012. The FEP called for a boycott of the constitutional referendum in December 2012 to demonstrate their rejection of the entire process that led to the Islamist-sponsored 2012 constitution.

=== After 2013 protests ===
The Free Egyptians Party supported the ouster of President Mohamed Morsi, which followed anti-government protests against him. The party regarded the protests leading up to Morsi's removal as a revolution and did not regard his overthrow as a coup. In December 2013, the older liberal Democratic Front Party merged into the Free Egyptians Party. In the same month, it was reported that the Free Egyptians Party had become part of the National Front Coalition, but in February 2014 the party clarified that it would not make sense to join an electoral alliance before the electoral law was even passed.

The Free Egyptians supported the 2014 Egyptian constitution that was up for vote during the January 2014 constitutional referendum, which it passed with 98.1% (while the turnout was 38.6%). In April 2014, the Free Egyptians Party was admitted as a full member to the Liberal International, as it had previously already been an observer member and member of the regional Arab Alliance for Freedom and Democracy. The party declared its support for candidate Abdel Fattah el-Sisi in the May 2014 presidential election.

The party won 65 seats in the 2015 Egyptian parliamentary election.

=== Internal crisis ===
Party founder Naguib Sawiris had cut off funding towards the party for 6–7 months in protest of its policies.

In late 2016, the party underwent a major internal crisis that led to the division of the party into two opposing factions; one led by party leader Essam Khalil, and the other led by Sawiris. Party members voted to dismiss the trustees of the party, including Sawiris, at a "general assembly" meeting in December.

Sawiris was ejected from the party the following February and filed a lawsuit against Khalil for violation of the party's internal bylaws.

It ran 14 candidates in the 2020 Egyptian parliamentary election for individual seats. However, the party lost all of its seats in the election.

== Organization ==
=== Leaders ===
Leader		Took office	Left office
1	Ahmed Hassan Said	10 May 2013	19 September 2014
2	Essam Khalil (acting)	September 2014	2014
3	Essam Khalil	31 December 2015	
4	Essam Khalil	24 March 2017	
4	Mahmoud El-Alaily (Sawiris-backed faction)	6 May 2017	

=== President ===
After the party's establishment, a presidential office was established to act as president of the party until internal elections. After the parliamentary elections of November 2011 and January 2012, Ahmed Said was appointed as interim president of the party and Rawi Camel-Touge as interim Secretary General. After holding the first congress of the party on 10 May 2013 Ahmed Said was elected as the first elected president of the Free Egyptians Party. After the merger of the Democratic Front Party into the Free Egyptians Party, at the first Supreme Council meeting on 28 April 2014 Essam Khalil was elected to be General Secretary.

in December 2015, the party elected Khalil as the second leader of the party, with 84% of the vote.

== Election results ==
Election year	# of overall votes	% of overall vote	# of overall seats won	+/–	Government
2011	1,201,119	(#4)	15 / 508	▲15	Opposition
2015	1,009,083	(#1)	65 / 596	▲50	Majority
2020	0	(NA)	0 / 284	▼ -65	(NA)
