= National Bloc (Egypt) =

National Bloc الكتلة الوطنية
- Founded: 2013
- National affiliation: Civil Democratic Current
- House of Representatives: 0 / 568

The National Bloc is a political party in Egypt created by former members of the Constitution Party.
