= Professional Syndicates Union =

The Professional Syndicates Union represents 24 syndicates and tribal coalitions from around Egypt. The group has opposed the ousting of President Mohamed Morsi and is part of the National Coalition for Supporting Legitimacy. Participating syndicates include the applied art designers', the dentists', the doctors', the engineers', farmers', the lawyers', the physiotherapists', the pharmacists', the teachers', the veterinarians', and other syndicates.
