= Ali Awad Saleh =

Egyptian judge

Ali Awad Saleh is an Egyptian judge. He is constitutional adviser to interim president Adly Mansour, and rapporteur to the constitutional amendment committee established in July 2013.

== Life ==
Saleh was the deputy chairman of the Supreme Constitutional Court (SCC). He represented the SCC in the first Constituent Assembly, established to draft a constitution after the 2011 Egyptian revolution. He resigned from the assembly in March 2012, shortly before it was dissolved.

On 5 July 2013 Adly Mansour appointed Saleh as a constitutional advisor. On 20 July Mansour announced a new ten-person constitutional amendment committee, which Saleh would coordinate.
