= New Labour (disambiguation) =

New Labour was the campaigning label for the British Labour Party under Tony Blair's leadership.

New Labour may also refer to:

- NewLabour Party (New Zealand), formed by Jim Anderton after he left the New Zealand Labour Party
- New Labour Party (South Africa), a minor political party in South Africa
- New Labour Party (Egypt), a Salafist political party in Egypt
- New Labour Unity Party, a Fijian political party, which broke away from the Fiji Labour Party

== See also ==
- New Labor Forum, a labor journal
- New labor history, a branch of labor history
