= Reform and Renaissance Party =

Political party in Egypt

Reform and Renaissance Party حزب الإصلاح والنهضة al-Eslah we al-Nahda
- Leader: Hesham Mustafa Abdel Aziz
- Founded: 18 July 2011
- Ideology: Islamism
- House of Representatives: 0 / 568

Website
- eslahnahda.com

The Reform and Renaissance Party (Arabic: حزب الإصلاح والنهضة, romanized: al-Eslah we al-Nahda) is an Islamist political party in Egypt.

== History ==
The party was established on 18 July 2011. Hesham Mustafa Abdel Aziz is the leader of the party. The party describes itself as a socially liberal party that emerged after the January 25 Revolution in 2011. It focuses on promoting political inclusiveness and supporting youth in political and social arenas. It is a party for all Egyptians, without discrimination, based on the principles of citizenship and equality, regardless of religion, color, ethnicity, or gender.

It joined the Democratic Alliance for Egypt ahead of the 2011–12 Egyptian parliamentary election.

The party accepted the protests that started on 30 June 2013. The following April, the Reform and Renaissance Party said that it would form a shadow government.

The party met with the Justice Party and the Egyptian Communist Party in June 2014 to discuss potential alliances for the 2015 Egyptian parliamentary election. The party announced on 4 July 2014 that it met with the Reform and Development Party to discuss coordination. Members of the Egyptian Social Democratic Party met with party members to discuss cooperation between the parties during the 2015 parliamentary elections. The party was in talks to merge with the Justice Party, though it ultimately became part of the For the Love of Egypt alliance.

The party participated in the 2025 Egyptian parliamentary election.

== Lawsuit against Islamic parties ==
The party is one of the eleven Islamic parties targeted by a lawsuit in November 2014, when an organization named Popular Front for opposing the Brotherhoodization of Egypt sought to dissolve all political parties established "on a religious basis." The Alexandria Urgent Matters Court however ruled on 26 November 2014 that it lacked jurisdiction.

== Ideology ==
The Reform and Renaissance Party believes that a strong state is only possible through a strong civil society, which can alleviate the burden on the government or hold it accountable. The party emphasizes that all its principles, programs, and statements must align with the values that represent Egyptian society and have shaped its identity to this day.

As a youth-oriented party, the Reform and Renaissance Party is committed to upholding national security requirements, political opposition to the government, and educating its members and youth about political work. It firmly believes that political and security stability can only be achieved within a stable party system. This was reiterated by Hisham Abdel Aziz, the party leader, during the Al-Ahram symposium titled "Parties Between Reality and Aspirations."
