= Egyptian Congress Party =

Political party in Egypt

Egyptian Congress Party حزب المؤتمر المصري
- Chairperson: Omar El-Mokhtar Semeida
- Honorary President: Mohammed El-Oraby
- Founder: Amr Moussa
- Founded: 18 September 2012
- Merger of: Ghad El-Thawra Party; Egyptian Citizen Party; Freedom Party; Egyptian Arab Union Party; Young Egypt Party
- Headquarters: Cairo
- Newspaper: Congress
- Youth wing: Union of Congress Party Youth
- Ideology: Secularism
- Political position: Centre-left
- National affiliation: National Unified List for Egypt (since 2020)
- Colours: Green; Blue
- Slogan: " Together we Build! " (Arabic: معا نبني)
- House of Representatives: 4 / 596
- Senate: 1 / 300

Website
- https://www.facebook.com/almotamrparty/

The Egyptian Congress Party (Arabic: حزب المؤتمر المصري), or Egyptian Conference Party, is a secularist political party in Egypt.

== History ==
It was created by the merger of 25 liberal and leftist parties, as well as remnants of the former National Democratic Party-regime.

According to the head of the Egypt Arab Socialist Party, Adel el-Qulla, 10 parties would merge. Omar Semeida, the head of the Egyptian Arab Union Party, indicated that parties which were not interested in merging would join with the party in the Egyptian Nation Alliance.

Several of the parties that agreed to or considered joining were the Ghad El-Thawra Party and the Democratic Front Party, and several parties that are descended from the National Democratic Party, including the Conservative Party, the Egyptian Freedom Party and the Egyptian Citizen Party. Also in the newly formed party are: "the Egyptian Arabic Socialist Party, the El-Geel Democratic Party, the Social Peace Party , the Reform and Building Party, the Sufi Egyptian, the Tahrir Party, Masr El-Fatah, the Egyptian Arabic Union, the Revolution's Guards, the Thawra Party, Arab for Justice and Equality (sic), the Social Justice Party, Al-Tali'a Al-Arabiya Party, Al-Wai'e Party, the Revolution Youth Union, Amr Moussa's presidential campaign team, El-Khodr Party and Al-Mustikloon Al-Goded."

The party was one of the founding members of the Egyptian Front.

The Conference Party participated in a 12 January 2015 meeting of multiple parties chaired by Egyptian president Abdel Fattah el-Sisi.

It joined the For the Love of Egypt alliance in September 2015.

The party joined the National Unified List for Egypt ahead of the 2020 Egyptian parliamentary election.

It joined the National Unified List for Egypt ahead of the 2025 Egyptian parliamentary election and won four seats.

== Electoral history ==
=== House of Representatives ===
Election	Party Leader	Seats	+/–
2015	Omar El-Mokhtar Semeida	12 / 596	▲12
2020	Omar El-Mokhtar Semeida	7 / 596	▼5
2025	Omar El-Mokhtar Semeida	4 / 596	▼1

=== Senate ===
Election	Seats	+/–
2020	3 / 300	▲3
2025	1 / 300	▼2
