= Asala =

Asala may refer to:

- Armenian Secret Army for the Liberation of Armenia, an Armenian militant organization
- Asalah Nasri, Syrian singer
- Asala Party, a Salafist political party in Egypt
- Al Asalah, a Salafist political party in Bahrain
- Asalha Puja, a Theravada Buddhist festival which typically takes place in July, on the full moon of the eighth lunar month
