= Change and Development Party =

Political party in Egypt

Egyptian Change and Development Party حزب التغيير والتنمية
- Leader: Bassem Khafagy
- Ideology: Islamism
- National affiliation: Egyptian Alliance
- House of Representatives: 0 / 568

The Egyptian Change and Development Party (Arabic: حزب التغيير والتنمية) is a conservative political party founded by Dr. Bassem Khafagy. The party is part of a group called the Egyptian Alliance; it was not intended to replace the National Alliance to Support Legitimacy. It was rather an attempt to expand the coalition against the coup in Egypt. As of end of 2013, The Muslim Brotherhood was against the Party and the Alliance fearing it could negative affect their control of the anti-coup movement.
