= Egyptian Hope Party =

Political party in Egypt

Egyptian Hope Party حزب الأمل المصرى
- Leader: Adel Naji
- Founded: 2014
- Ideology: Pragmatism
- House of Representatives: 0 / 568

The Egyptian Hope Party (Arabic: حزب الأمل المصرى; Alamal) is a political party in Egypt created by former members of the Constitution Party. The party plans to run in the 2015 Egyptian parliamentary election.
