= Arab Unification Party =

Arab Unification Party (Egypt) حزب التوحيد العربي Al-Tawhid Al-Arabi
- Founded: June 2011
- Ideology: Islamism; Arab-Islamic nationalism Pan-Arabism
- House of Representatives: 0 / 568

The Arab Unification Party is an Islamist political party that was founded by former leaders of the Egyptian Islamic Labour Party, independents and Islamists. The party withdrew from the Anti-Coup Alliance.
