= Egypt Youth Party =

Political party in Egypt

- Chairman: Ahmed Abdul Hadi
- Founded: 2005
- Headquarters: Cairo
- Ideology: Secularism; Democracy
- House of Representatives: 0 / 568

The Egypt Youth Party is a small democratic secular political party in Egypt.
