= Egyptian Alliance Party =

Political party in Egypt

- Leader: Muhammed Al Gilany
- Founded: 2011
- House of Representatives: 0 / 568

The Egyptian Alliance Party is a political party in Egypt. It is headed by Muhammed Al Gilany who is a member of the National Association for Change.
