= Egypt Development Party =

Egyptian political party

Egypt Development Party حزب مصر التنمية Hizb Masr al-Tanmiya
- Leader: Yomna El-Hamaki
- House of Representatives: 0 / 568

The Egypt Development Party is an Egyptian political party made up of former members of the NDP.

== History ==
The EDP was founded by former members of the National Democratic Party (NDP), which was the ruling party in Egypt for 30 years until its dissolution in 2011. The party's founders believed that the NDP had become corrupt and ineffective, and that a new party was needed to represent the interests of the Egyptian people.

The EDP was officially registered in May 2011, following the Egyptian revolution. The party participated in the 2011–2012 parliamentary elections but failed to win any seats. However, it has continued to be active in Egyptian politics, and it has participated in subsequent elections.
