= Egypt's Unity =

Egypt's Unity وحدة مصر
- Founded: 18 August 2015

Egypt's Unity was an alliance of political parties that intended to run in the Egyptian 2015 parliamentary election.
