= Youth for Egypt Party =

Political party in Egypt

- Split from: Muslim Brotherhood in Egypt
- Ideology: Islamism

The Youth for Egypt Party is a political party that is made up of former members of the Egyptian Muslim Brotherhood. The coordinator of the Brotherhood Youth Alliance, Amr Emara, has requested a meeting with the Salafi Nour Party to ask that the Salafi party forms an alliance with it. The Nour Party will instead ally with the 38 Copts Initiative.
