= Free Republican Party (Egypt) =

The Free Republican Party Al-Hizb al-Gomhory al-Ahrar الحزب الجمهوري الحر
- Founded: 2006; 19 years ago
- Headquarters: Cairo
- Ideology: Arab nationalism Liberal democracy
- House of Representatives: 0 / 568

The Free Republican Party or Al-Hizb al-Gomhory al-Ahrar (Arabic: الحزب الجمهوري الحر) is a political party in Egypt. The Free Republican Party might be considered as a liberal party.

== History and profile ==
The party was established in 2006. The leader of the party, which regards the Islamic Shariah as the core of legislation and supports a free economic system, is Hossam Mostafa.

== Platform ==
- Upholding Islamic Sharia as the main source of legislation.
- Supporting Egypt's right to sovereignty over its territories and national waters and upholds the country's historical right to the leadership of both the Arab and Islamic regions.
- Underlining the need to maintaining Egypt's social fabric and promotes equality between Egyptians.
- Upholding political freedoms and human rights and endorses respect of the Constitution and the rule of the law.
- Advocating multi-partisanship.
- Supporting free education, social solidarity and social justice.
- Supporting state-provided mother, child and youth care.
- Advocating the elimination of economic monopolies.
- Advocating separation of the legislative, judicial and executive authorities.
- Advocating integration with the Arab world and the reviving of Arab nationalism.

== See also ==
- Liberalism
- Contributions to liberal theory
- Liberalism worldwide
- List of liberal parties
- Liberal democracy
- Liberalism in Egypt
