= Egypt Renaissance Party =

Egypt Renaissance Party حزب نهضة مصر Hizb Nahdet Masr
- Leader: Ahmed Abul-Nazar
- House of Representatives: 0 / 568

The Egypt Renaissance Party is an Egyptian political party made up of former members of the National Democratic Party.
