= Egyptian Arab Union Party =

Egyptian Arab Union Party حزب الاتحاد المصري العربي
- Leader: Omar al-Mukhtar; Hussein Omar Semeida
- Founded: 7 August 2011
- Dissolved: 18 September 2012
- Merged into: Conference Party
- Headquarters: Cairo
- Ideology: Arab nationalism

The Egyptian Arab Union Party (Arabic: حزب الاتحاد المصري العربي), also translated as the Arab Egyptian Union Party and the Arab Egyptian Union Party, was a political party in Egypt.

== History ==
It was headed by Omar Semeida. During its peak, it managed to gain one seat in the Parliament of Egypt. It was a secular party and aimed to create a confederation with Sudan. The party merged into the Conference Party in 2012.

== Electoral history ==
=== People's Assembly elections ===
| Election | Seats | +/– |
|---|---|---|
| 2011–12 | 1 / 596 | ▲1 |
