= Islamic Alliance to Support Egypt =

Defunct Egyptian electoral alliance

The Islamic Alliance to Support Egypt was an alliance of Islamist dissidents from the Muslim Brotherhood and al-Gama'a al-Islamiyya that would have run in the 2015 Egyptian parliamentary election. The different Islamist groups have different views on participation in the 2015 election.

== Formerly affiliated groups ==
- Free Front of the Islamic Group
- Reform of the Islamic Group
- Revolt of the Islamic Group
- Brotherhood Dissidents
- Brotherhood Without Violence
