= Human Rights and Citizenship Party =

Political party in Egypt

Human Rights and Citizenship Party حزب حقوق الانسان والمواطنة
- Leader: Gamal Al-Tohami
- Founded: approximately 2011
- Political position: Centre
- National affiliation: Call of Egypt
- House of Representatives: 0 / 568

The Human Rights and Citizenship Party is an Egyptian political party.

The party ran in the 2011-2012 Egyptian parliamentary election in Alexandria and Assiut.
