= Nubian Nile Party =

Political party in Egypt

- Ideology: Nationalism
- Political position: Right-wing
- House of Representatives: 0 / 568

The Nubian Nile Party is a political party that emphasizes issues that pertain to the Nubian community. They are right-leaning politically, and want Nubians to have more rights and representation in politics in Egypt.
