= Egyptian Will Party =

Political party in Egypt

Egyptian Will Party الإرادة المصرية Al-Arada Al-masria
- Leader: Mahmoud Marzouk
- Founded: March 2013
- House of Representatives: 0 / 568

The Egyptian Will Party (Arabic: الإرادة المصرية;Al-Arada Al-masria) is an Egyptian political party made up of retired members of the Egyptian military.
