= Free Social Constitutional Party =

Political party in Egypt

Free Social Constitutional Party Al-Hizb Al-Distouri الحزب الدستوري الاجتماعي الحر
- Chairman: Mamdouh Qenawi
- Founded: 2004
- Headquarters: Cairo
- Ideology: Liberal democracy Liberal socialism
- National affiliation: Social Justice coalition
- House of Representatives: 0 / 568

The Free Social Constitutional Party or Al-Hizb Al-Distouri (Arabic: الحزب الدستوري الاجتماعي الحر) is a political party in Egypt. The Free Social Constitutional Party might be considered as a liberal democratic and a liberal socialist party. It was later re-established and renamed as the Will of a Generation Party.

== Platform ==
- Drafting a new Constitution.
- Reforming education.
- Reforming the health sector.
- Creating a favorable investment atmosphere, ensuring swift justice, eliminating red tape, reducing taxes and providing high-quality services.
- Supervising the State Budget
- Approving the appointment of senior State officials by the People's Assembly.
- Establishing a poor bank.

== See also ==
- Liberalism
- Contributions to liberal theory
- Liberalism worldwide
- List of liberal parties
- Liberal democracy
- Liberalism in Egypt
