= Social Justice Party (Egypt) =

Political party in Egypt

- Chairman: Mohamed Farghal
- Founded: 6 June 1993
- Headquarters: Cairo, Egypt
- Ideology: Democratic socialism Islamic socialism Progressivism; Social justice
- Political position: Left-wing
- House of Representatives: 0 / 568

The Social Justice Party (Arabic: حزب العدالة الاجتماعية) is a democratic and progressive political party in Egypt.

== History and profile ==
The party was established in 1993. It supports left-leaning non-secular democratic and progressive views. It calls for equal rights and duties for all citizens, boosting principles of loyalty to homeland and achieving justice for all citizens.
The party fielded three candidates to run for the 2000 legislative polls.

== Platform ==
- Maintaining the national unity and social peace, enhancing the principles of democracy and socialism and protecting gains of the labor class and peasants.
- Islamic sharia is a main source of legislation.
- Promoting respect between the ruling parties and opposition parties.
- Equal rights for all citizens.

== See also ==
- List of Islamic political parties
