= Arab Party for Justice and Equality =

Arab Party for Justice and Equality الحزب العربي للعدل والمساواة
- Leader: Aly Fereig
- Founded: July 2011
- Ideology: Arab nationalism
- National affiliation: Call of Egypt
- House of Representatives: 0 / 568

The Arab Party for Justice and Equality (Arabic: الحزب العربي للعدل والمساواة) is a political party that involves Arab tribes from the Sinai and Upper Egypt in the political process.
