= Egyptian Liberation Party =

Political party in Egypt

Egyptian Tahrir Party Hizb ut-Tahrir il-Masri
- Leader: Ibrahim Zahran
- Ideology: Social democracy Sufism
- National affiliation: Egyptian Front
- House of Representatives: 0 / 568

The Egyptian Liberation Party is a Sufi political party in Egypt. The party was founded by Sheikh Aboul Azayem. most of the members are part of the Al Azmeya Sufi order. The party is backed by the ‘Azmeyya Tareeka Sufi order. The party calls itself social democratic.

It was founded in February 2011 by Ibrahim Zahran right after the January 2011 uprising. It is a member of the Egyptian Bloc alliance, it is the only religious party within that bloc.

== See also ==
- List of Islamic political parties
