= Civil Democratic Movement (2017) =

Civil Democratic Movement الحركة المدنية الديمقراطية
- Founded: 13 December 2017
- Ideology: Progressivism
- Political position: Centre-left; Factions: Centre to left-wing
- House of Representatives: 28 / 568
- Senate: 11 / 300

The Civil Democratic Movement (Arabic: الحركة المدنية الديمقراطية, romanized: al-Ḥarakah al-Madanīyah al-Dīmuqrāṭīyah; also called the National Civil Movement) is a liberal political movement formed in Egypt in 2017.

== History ==
The alliance was created in December 2017 and initially included seven parties and many "public figures", including Hamdeen Sabahi, former minister Ahmed el-Borei and Mohamed Anwar Esmat Sadat.

The alliance includes various parties that were also involved in the Civil Democratic Current; namely, the Constitution Party, the Dignity Party, Socialist Popular Alliance Party, Egyptian Social Democratic Party and the Bread and Freedom Party.

According to Khaled Dawoud, the former spokesman for the alliance, it only met twice in five months following the 2023 Egyptian presidential election.

The alliance faced divisions over Ahmed Tantawi's failed attempt to run in the presidential election. The Justice Party and the Egyptian Social Democratic Party (ESDP) opposed the decision by other parties in the alliance to boycott the election and reportedly declared "their intention to suspend their participation in the movement." According to the "media secretary" for the ESDP, the party sent an "internal letter" to inform other members of the Civil Democratic Movement of its suspension.

The Civil Democratic Movement faced turmoil in May 2026 after issuing a statement defending Conservative Party leader Akmal Kortam following demolition of his property by the state. Another statement was issued, following severe criticism, admitted to poor wording in the original statement which equated the demolition to El Warraq, demolition of cemeteries, and other rights issues. The Socialist Popular Alliance clarified that it did not agree with the original statement, while the Justice Party left the alliance, describing the separation as a "culmination of years of concern."

== Affiliated parties ==
- Bread and Freedom Party
- Constitution Party
- Dignity Party
- Egyptian Social Democratic Party
- Freedom Egypt Party
- Reform and Development Party
- Socialist Popular Alliance Party
- National Progressive Unionist Rally Party

== Policies ==
The policies of the alliance included the forming a "civilian democratic state" without discrimination, in addition to "protecting freedom of thought, expression, organisation and peaceful protest."
