= Egyptian Nation Party =

Egyptian Umma Party حزب الأمة المصرية
- Leader: Mohamed Abbas
- Founded: 2012
- Ideology: Moderate islamism

The Egyptian Umma Party or Egyptian Nation Party (Arabic: حزب الأمة المصرية) was a political party in Egypt, founded by supporters of presidential candidate Hazem Salah Abu Ismail in 2012. Abu Ismail himself has, however, not joined the party itself. Abu Ismail announced on 17 December 2012 that the party would compete for all of the seats in the 2013 parliamentary election. The party is one of a network of three parties. The name of the party was changed to the Flag Party in 2013.
