= Victory Party (Egypt) =

Political party in Egypt

Victory Party النصر El Nasr
- Leader: Mohamed Salah Zayed
- House of Representatives: 0 / 568

The Victory Party is a Sufi political party in Egypt.
