= Free Egypt Party =

Political party in Egypt

Free Egypt Party مصر الحرة Misr Al-Hurra
- Leader: Abdullah El-Ashaal
- Founded: March 2011
- Regional affiliation: Arab Liberal Federation
- House of Representatives: 0 / 568

The Free Egypt Party is a political party that calls for a civil state and social justice.
