= Solidarity Party (Egypt) =

Political party in Egypt

Solidarity Party (Hizb Al- Takaful) حزب التكافل Hizb Al-Takaful
- Chairman: Dr. Osama Mohamed Shaltout
- Founded: 5 February 1995
- Headquarters: Cairo
- House of Representatives: 0 / 568

The Social Solidarity party (Al-Takaful) is an Egyptian Islamist party with a membership of around 970 members. Five candidates affiliated with this party ran in the 2000 legislative elections.
