= Bread and Freedom Party =

Political party in Egypt

Bread and Freedom Party حزب العيش والحرية
- Founded: 2013
- Split from: Socialist Popular Alliance Party
- Ideology: Democratic socialism Anti-capitalism
- Political position: Left-wing
- National affiliation: Civil Democratic Movement; Social Justice Front
- House of Representatives: 0 / 568

The Bread and Freedom Party (Arabic: حزب العيش والحرية; Hizb AlEish WaAlHorria), also translated as the Bread and Liberty Party, is a democratic socialist party in Egypt created in November 2013 by former members of the Socialist Popular Alliance Party.

== History ==
280 members from the Socialist Popular Alliance Party gave their resignations in early November 2013, though the resignations were rejected by Abdel Ghafar Shukr, the head of the party. The Daily News Egypt site gives the number of resigning members as 304. The resigning members criticized their former party for aligning itself with the military during the transitional period and defending the actions of the police. The members formed a new party in response.

The party is not registered as of 10 February 2014.

== Policies ==
The policies of the Bread and Freedom Party include wealth redistribution and development.

== Leadership ==
Khaled Ali, who was the leader of the party, resigned from it in 2018.
