= New Labour Party (Egypt) =

Political party in Egypt

New Labour Party العمل الجديد Al Amal Al Jadeed
- Leader: Magdy Hussein
- Ideology: Salafism
- National affiliation: National Legitimacy Support Coalition
- House of Representatives: 0 / 568

The New Labour Party (Al Amal Al Jadeed) is a Salafist political party in Egypt.
