= Homeland Party (Egypt) =

Political party in Egypt

Homeland Party حزب الوطن
- Founded: 1 January 2013
- Split from: Al-Nour Party
- Ideology: Salafism
- House of Representatives: 0 / 568

Website
- www.facebook.com/watanpartyeg

The Homeland Party (Arabic: حزب الوطن, romanized: Ḥizb al‑Watan) is an Islamist political party in Egypt, founded in January 2013 following a split within the al-Nour Party. It was formed when Emad Abdel Ghaffour, the former leader of al-Nour, and 150 other party members quit in protest at the part of a dispute between Ghaffour and followers of Yasser Borhamy. The party has stated that Copts will be allowed to join the party and women will be allowed on electoral lists. In June 2013, 130 members of the party resigned in response to differences within the party leadership. The party withdrew from the Anti-Coup Alliance on 17 September 2014, though the reason for its withdrawal was not because of political differences.

== Lawsuit against Islamic parties ==
The Homeland Party is one of the eleven Islamic parties targeted by a lawsuit in November 2014, when an organization named Popular Front for opposing the Brotherhoodization of Egypt sought to dissolve all political parties established "on a religious basis." The Alexandria Urgent Matters Court however ruled on 26 November 2014 that it lacked jurisdiction.
