= Anti-Coup Alliance =

- Leader: Ehab Sheiha
- Founded: 27 June 2013
- Banned: September 2014
- Ideology: Islamism

The Anti-Coup Alliance (also known as the National Alliance Supporting Legitimacy) is a coalition in Egypt formed to reverse the ouster of former president Mohamed Morsi. The coalition is made up of approximately 40 Islamist parties and groups.

== History ==
The coalition has called upon the opposition to break ties with figures they call "corrupt" from the Mubarak regime. Notably, the political wing of the group (the Building and Development Party) and the Wasat Party did not take part in protests held by pro-Morsi forces during the week of 18 October 2013. The alliance offered a new reconciliation initiative that does not include the reinstatement of Morsi on 26 October 2013; al-Gama'a al-Islamiyya, Egyptian Islamic Jihad and the Homeland Party are not calling for the reinstatement of Morsi, while the Virtue Party, Authenticity Party and the Muslim Brotherhood are still demanding that Morsi be reinstated as president. The group has reached out to what it called "fellow revolutionaries" to cooperate with them against the protest law in Egypt in order to jointly organize protests; Kefaya objected to the call for cooperation.

Members of the Building and Development Party, the political arm of al-Gama'a al-Islamiyya, wanted to meet with Yasser Borhamy, the deputy head of the Salafist Call as well as Emad Abdel Ghaffour, who is the head of the Homeland Party. Borhamy reportedly could not meet with the members, while Ghaffour asked them to stop demonstrations before talks could begin and rebuffed their demands for the reinstatement of Morsi and the bringing back of the Shura Council that was dissolved. Borhami denied being asked to serve as a mediator, though he stated that he would act as a mediator if there were no preconditions. The alliance has said it will boycott the 2014 constitutional referendum.

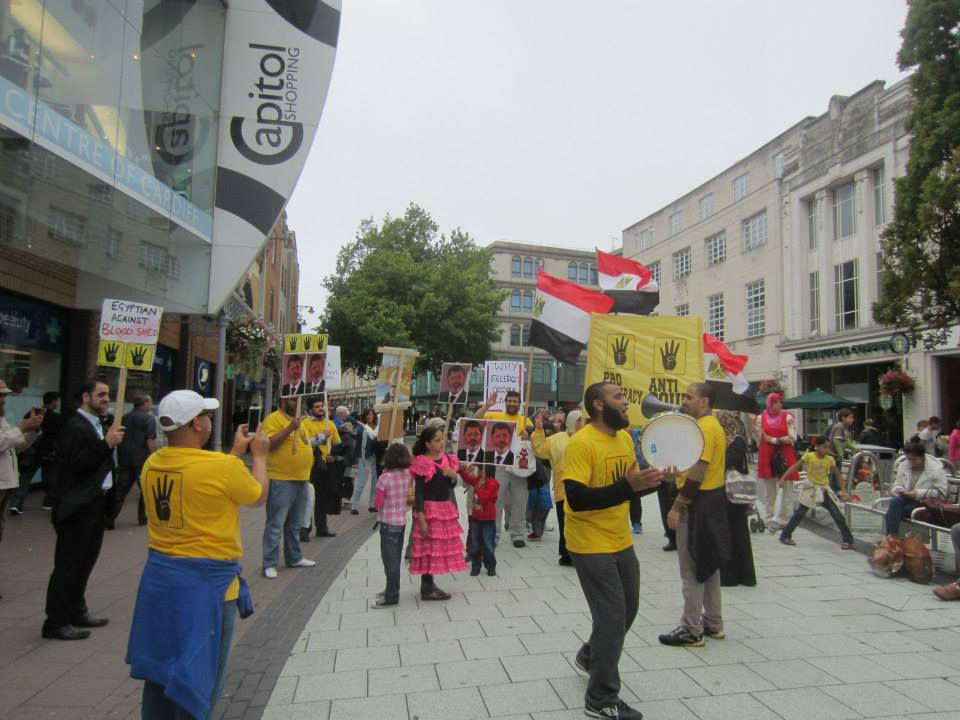
An Anti-Coup Alliance demonstration in Cardiff, UK on 21 Sept 2013.

Various groups and parties within the alliance including al-Gama'a al-Islamiyya, the Building and Development Party, the Islamic Party, the Freedom and Justice Party and the Virtue Party have criticized the Nour Party for its support of the draft constitution. The Islamic Party has not participated in meetings with the group because of what Mohamed Abu Samra (the secretary-general of the party) called the "brotherhood's radical thought". The Salafist Front issued a statement on 30 April 2014 that called on the alliance to temporarily stop its actions in order to avoid more violence; the alliance did not suspend its activities in response. Egyptian Prime minister Ibrahim Mahlab issued a decree on 16 October 2014 banning the alliance. Another decree was issued on 30 October 2014 which dissolved the alliance. A court postponed the appeal of the dissolution of the alliance until 13 November 2014.

== Affiliated groups ==
Parties and organizations in the coalition include:

- Authenticity Party
- Building and Development Party
- Civilized Alternative Party
- Egyptian Islamic Labour Party
- Egyptian Reform Party
- Flag Party
- Freedom and Justice Party
- Al-Gama'a al-Islamiyya
- New Labor Party
- People Party
- Virtue Party

== Withdrawals ==
The Wasat Party withdrew from the alliance on 28 August 2014. The Homeland Party withdrew from the alliance on 17 September 2014, though the reason for its leaving was to reorganize itself. The Authenticity Party was considering leaving the alliance because it has not achieved its goals. The Salafist Front had withdrawn from the alliance on 30 November 2014. The Independence Party announced on 4 December 2014 that it had withdrawn. The Arab Unification Party and the Islamic Party have withdrawn from the Anti-Coup Alliance. al-Gama'a al-Islamiyya is considering withdrawing from the alliance. Osama Hafez, the leader of the groups shura council, has called on the organization to withdraw from the alliance.

== Court cases ==
A court verdict that could have banned the alliance was not given on 21 May 2014 because the Cairo Court for Urgent Matters ruled that it lacked jurisdiction. An appeal to dissolve the coalition was thrown out on 22 September 2014 partly because it did not indicate what parties are part of the alliance and did not indicate the coalitions alleged connections to "terrorist activities". Another verdict in September 2014 banned the alliance.
