= Authenticity Party =

Political party in Egypt

Authenticity Party حزب الأصالة
- Chairman: Ehab Shiha
- Founded: July 2011
- Ideology: Religious conservatism Islamism; Salafism
- Political position: Far-right
- National affiliation: National Legitimacy Support Coalition
- House of Representatives: 0 / 568

The Authenticity Party (Arabic: حزب الأصالة, ḥizb el-asala) is one of the political parties created in Egypt after the 2011 Egyptian Revolution. It has an ultra-conservative Islamist Salafist ideology, which believes in implementing strict Sharia law.

== History ==
The party was formed by the former head of the Virtue Party, General Adel Abdel Maksoud; he left the Virtue Party after allegedly discovering a plot which changed the moderate principles of the party.

The party joined the Democratic Alliance for Egypt ahead of the 2011–12 Egypt parliamentary elections, though it withdrew and formed the Islamist Bloc alongside the Al-Nour Party, another Salafist party, and the Building and Development Party, the political wing of Al-Jama'a al-Islamiyya; both parties were also part of the Democratic Alliance for Egypt. The Islamist Bloc received 7,534,266 votes out of a total 27,065,135 correct votes (27.8%) and gained 127 of the 498 parliamentary seats contested, second-place after the Muslim Brotherhood's Freedom and Justice Party. The Authenticity Party received 3 of these 127 seats.

The Authenticity Party joined the National Legitimacy Support Coalition. The party was considering leaving the Anti-Coup Alliance in October 2014.

== Electoral history ==
=== People's Assembly elections ===
Election	Seats	+/–
2011–12 (as part of Islamist Bloc)	3 / 596	▲3

== Lawsuit against Islamic parties ==
The Authenticity Party is one of the eleven Islamic parties targeted by a lawsuit in November 2014, when an organization named Popular Front for opposing the Brotherhoodization of Egypt sought to dissolve all political parties established "on a religious basis." The Alexandria Urgent Matters Court however ruled on 26 November 2014 that it lacked jurisdiction.

== See also ==
- List of political parties in Egypt
