= Egyptian Communist Party =

Egyptian Communist Party الحزب الشيوعي المصري
- General Secretary: Salah Adli
- Founded: 1975
- Headquarters: Cairo
- Newspaper: Victory
- Ideology: Communism; Marxism–Leninism
- Political position: Far-left
- National affiliation: Coalition of Socialist Forces; National Salvation Front
- International affiliation: IMCWP
- Colours: Red
- House of Representatives: 0 / 567

Party flag

The Egyptian Communist Party (ECP; Arabic: الحزب الشيوعي المصري) is a Marxist–Leninist party in Egypt.

== History and profile ==
The modern Egyptian Communist Party (ECP) was formed in 1975 by a number of members of the former Egyptian Communist Party. Under the regimes of Presidents Anwar Sadat and Hosni Mubarak the new Communist Party faced state repression and was barred from running in elections. The party however continued to operate underground until the overthrow of Mubarak in 2011. In the years leading up to the 2011 uprising, the ECP, along with other leftist political organizations, faced many challenges, including government repression, internal divisions, and lack of popular support. Despite having ECP members allegedly killed and imprisoned under Mubarak, the party have since been involved in mobilizing workers in 2011.

On 1 May 2011, Party Chairman Salah al-Adly openly announced that the ECP would resume their activities in a news conference at Tahrir Square. He also recounted that in previous decades the party members had been repeatedly repressed and falsely accused of criminal activity and atheism.

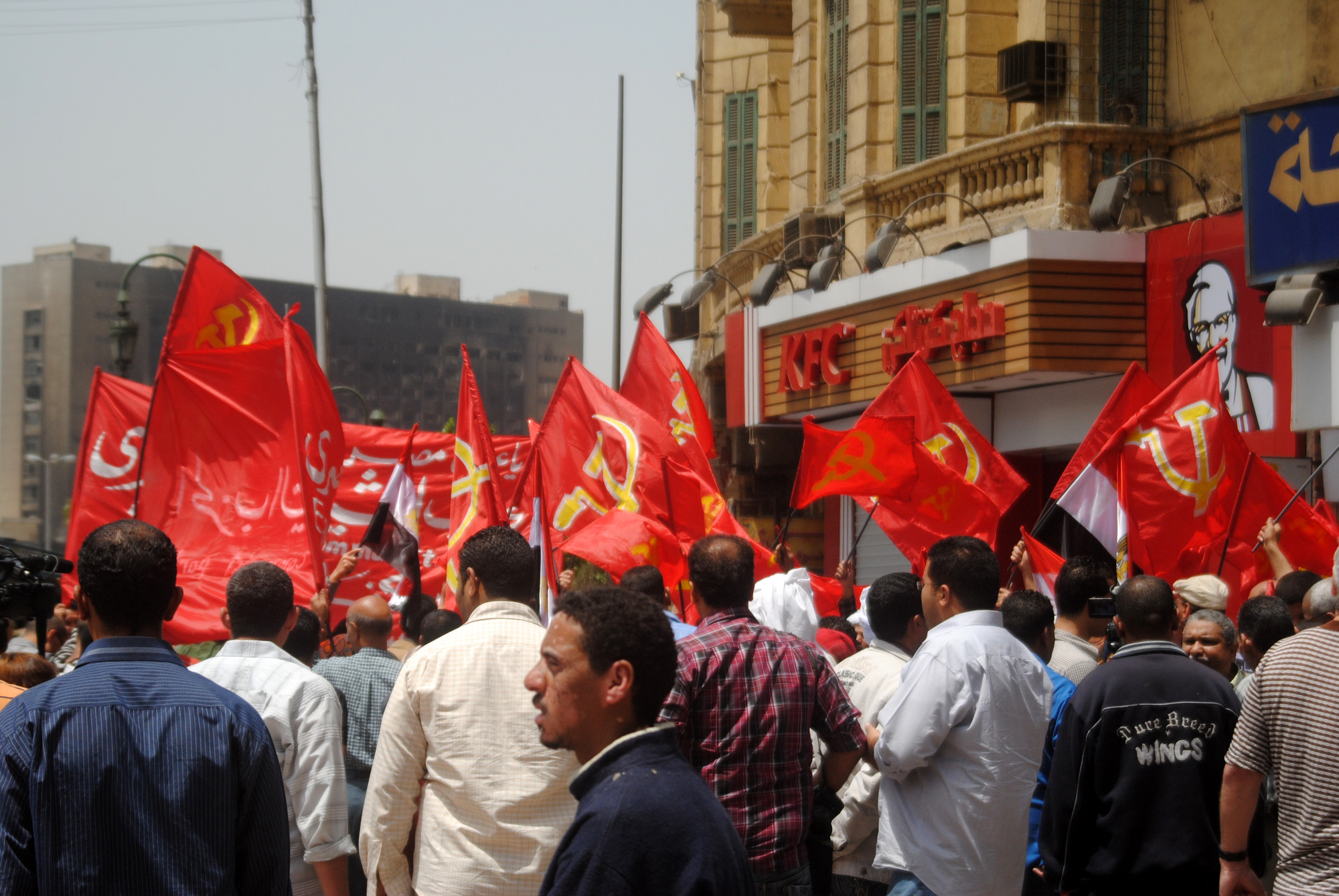
Egyptian Communist Party flags in Tahrir Square.

On 10 May 2011, the ECP agreed to enter into a "socialist front" with four other Egyptian leftist groups called the Coalition of Socialist Forces, which includes the Revolutionary Socialists, the Socialist Popular Alliance Party, Socialist Party of Egypt and the Workers Democratic Party. It also joined the National Salvation Front.

The party also maintains ties with Vietnam, as members of the ECP met with a reporter at the Communist Review in late 2022. Both groups wanted to grow their relationship and maintain communication channels that allow mutual support between the groups. The CIA also alleges ties between the ECP and Russia through Michel Kamil, a journalist and ECP leader.

The ECP also signed a letter along with other leftist parties from across the globe to address their concerns with the developments in Iran since December 2022. In October 2022, these parties held the International Meeting of Communist and Workers' Parties (IMCWP) where they expressed their solidarity with persecuted communists in Iran and their disproval of the dictatorial regimes.

The party maintains a social media presence on Twitter and Facebook.

== See also ==
- Egyptian Communist Party (1921)
- Sudanese Communist Party
