= Life of the Egyptians Party =

Political party in Egypt

Life of the Egyptians Party حياة المصريين Hayat Al Masryeen
- Leader: Mohamed Abu Hamed
- House of Representatives: 0 / 568

The Life of the Egyptians Party, or Egyptians Life Party is a political party started by former MP Mohamed Abu Hamed.
