= Social Peace Party =

Social Peace Party Al Salam Al Ijtemaei’
- Secretary: Hefzy Ahmed Zayed
- Founded: 2011
- Headquarters: Cairo
- Ideology: Social liberalism Redistributism; Populism
- House of Representatives: 0 / 568

The Social Peace Party (Arabic: حزب السلام الاجتماعي) is a political party in Egypt that seeks a fair distribution of wealth and an independent judiciary.
