= Egyptian Reform Party =

Political party in Egypt

Egyptian Reform Party Islah Party
- Founded: 16 September 2011
- Ideology: Salafism
- National affiliation: National Legitimacy Support Coalition
- House of Representatives: 0 / 568

The Egyptian Reform Party (Arabic: حزب الإصلاح) is a Salafi political party. The party is made up mostly of young Salafis. A spokesperson for the party, named Essam Abdel Baset, has stated that the party will rely on scholars from Al Azhar and not Salafi sheiks. The party was at one point part of the Democratic Alliance for Egypt.

== Electoral history ==
=== People's Assembly elections ===
Election	Seats	+/–
2011–12 (as part of Democratic Alliance for Egypt)	1 / 596	▲1
