= People Party =

Political party in Egypt

People Party الشعب Al Shaab
- Founded: 20 October 2012
- Ideology: Islamism; Economic populism
- National affiliation: Anti-Coup Alliance
- House of Representatives: 0 / 568

The People Party is an Islamist party in Egypt which is part of the Anti-Coup Alliance.

== History and profile ==
On 8 October 2012 the Egyptian Salafist Front proposed the creation of a new political party, to be named the People Party. The party was established on 20 October 2012. According to Ahmed Mawlana, the official party spokesman, the People Party will deal with issues that it perceives to be neglected by other Islamic parties, such as "the Nubians’ rights, as well as those of farmers and workers".

== Political program ==
The People Party prioritizes seeking justice and identity. Individuals and groups that overuse government resources are not appreciated. Identity is paramount, with a special emphasis on cultural, economic, and political independence. Subsidized education is encouraged. Support of Palestine in the Israeli-Palestinian Conflict is an additional plank of the party's platform.

== See also ==
- List of Islamic political parties
