= Democratic Front Party =

Egyptian political party

Democratic Front Party حزب الجبهة الديمقراطية
- President: Ahmed Diab
- General Secretary: Rizk Al Malla
- Founders: Ahmed Diab; Yehia El Gamal
- Founded: May 2007
- Dissolved: December 2013
- Merged into: Free Egyptians Party
- Headquarters: Giza
- Ideology: Liberalism (Egypt)
- Political position: Centre-right
- National affiliation: National Salvation Front
- International affiliation: Liberal International; Alliance of Democrats
- Colours: Sky blue, azure
- Slogan: "Freedom, Justice, Responsibility"

Website
- www.democraticfront.org

The Democratic Front Party was an Egyptian political party. The party merged with the Free Egyptians Party in December 2013.

== Foundation and profile ==
The party was founded in 2007 by Ahmed Diab and Yehia Al Gamal.

The party adopted liberal ideologies. It was a full member of both the Liberal International and the Alliance of Democrats.

Founder Osama Al Ghazali was the chairman of the party. His deputy was the writer Sakina Fuad. Mohamed Mansour and Ibrahim Nawar were secretaries-general. Since March 2011 the Democratic Front Party has participated in the Cabinet of Egypt (Essam Sharaf). Before his death, writer Osama Anwar Okasha was also an executive member of the party.

Its slogan was "Councilor Dr. Ahmed Diab is a Democratic Front Party Leader and Coming President of Egypt."

== See also ==
- Liberalism in Egypt
- List of political parties in Egypt
- Politics of Egypt
