= Reform and Development Party (Egypt) =

Reform and Development Party حزب الأصلاح و التنمية
- Chairman: Mohamed Anwar Esmat Sadat
- Founder: Mohamed Anwar Esmat Sadat
- Founded: 2009; 17 years ago
- Headquarters: Cairo
- Ideology: Liberalism; Economic liberalism; Egyptian nationalism
- Political position: Centre
- National affiliation: Civil Democratic Movement; Democratic Path Alliance; National Unified List for Egypt (since 2020)
- Colors: Gold
- House of Representatives: 11 / 596
- Senate: 4 / 300

Website
- http://www.rdpegypt.org/

The Reform and Development Party (Arabic: حزب الأصلاح و التنمية, romanized: Hizb Al-Islah wa Al-Tanmiyah) is a political party in Egypt.

== History and profile ==
The Reform and Development Party was founded in 2009 as a split from the Democratic Front Party. The founders of the party are Mohamed Anwar Esmat Sadat, the ex-president Anwar Sadat's nephew, and the Egyptian billionaire Raymond Lakah. The initial license application of the party was rejected in July 2010. It was legalized in May 2011, after Egypt's 25 January Revolution in 2011.

The party participated in the 2011–12 Egyptian parliamentary election and won nine seats in the lower house.

Although the Reform and Development Party participated in the 2015 parliamentary elections, Sadat criticized the election process, which was delayed for seven months, as well as the Supreme Constitutional Court being allowed to rule on complaints against election laws.

It joined the Civil Democratic Movement when it launched in 2017.

The party has gradually distanced itself from president Abdel Fattah el-Sisi, and Sadat briefly ran in the 2018 Egyptian presidential election, though he withdrew. Sadat criticized the pro-Sisi "Alashan Tbneeha" (To Build It) campaign on constitutional grounds for allowing government employees to publicly support the campaign. Supporters of his own campaign, "Benhab al-Sadat" (We Love al-Sadat), have been harassed by the government.

It joined the National Unified List for Egypt ahead of the 2020 Egyptian parliamentary election.

The party joined the Democratic Path Alliance in June 2025, alongside the Justice Party and the Egyptian Social Democratic Party, ahead of the 2025 Egyptian Senate election and began negotiating joining the National Unified List for Egypt. The party confirmed joining the National Unified List in late October when the alliance submitted nomination papers ahead of the 2025 Egyptian parliamentary election. Sadat argued on Saudi-owned MBC Masr that the party did not possess the finances, or the experienced politicians, to run on its own and also pointed to the lack of a "mixed system". The party won nine elected seats.

== Electoral history ==
=== People's Assembly elections ===
Election	Seats	+/–
2011/2012	9 / 596	▲9

=== House of Representatives elections ===
Election	Seats	+/–
2015	3 / 596	▼6
2020	9 / 596	▲3
2025	11 / 596	▲2

=== Senate elections ===
Election	Seats	+/–
2020	3 / 300	▲3
2025	4 / 300	▲1
