= Egyptian Popular Current =

Egyptian Popular Current التيار الشعبي المصري
- Founder: Hamdeen Sabahi
- Founded: 21 September 2012
- Preceded by: Dignity Party
- Headquarters: Cairo
- Ideology: Secularism; Nasserism
- Political position: Left-wing
- National affiliation: Civil Democratic Current
- Colours: Green
- Slogan: Freedom . Social Justice . National Independence; Arabic: حرية . عدالة اجتماعية . استقلال وطني
- House of Representatives: 0 / 596
- Senate: 0 / 300

Website
- http://www.tayarsha3by.com

The Egyptian Popular Current (التيار الشعبي المصري at-tāyar ash-shāʿībi al-masri) is a movement in Egypt, created after the 2012 presidential elections by former presidential candidate Hamdeen Sabahi. The movement was formed on 21 September 2012. The movement formed the Popular Current Party on 21 September 2014.

== Formation and structure ==
The formation of the Popular Current movement by Nasserist politician Hamdeen Sabahi, the third-place candidate during 2012 presidential elections, was announced in late September 2012 during a conference in Cairo's Abdeen Square. Its establishment aimed to consolidate and institutionalize Sabahi's unexpected support during the elections.

The conference was moderated by journalist Hussein Abdel Ghani and featured as guest speakers the prominent journalist Hamdi Qandil, Federation of Independent Trade Unions head Kamal Abu Eita, Sharqiyah pastor Yoannes Ishak, late president Gamal Abdel Nasser's son Abdel Hakim, and public figures from the Sinai Peninsula and the southern region of Nubia, among other personalities. While the Popular Current's members were generally leftists, nationalists and revolutionary youth supportive of Sabahi's adoption of the "social justice" platform, Sabahi called for the newly formed party to attract all Egyptians, including the "workers, farmers, craftsmen, fishermen, producers, middle class, Muslims, Copts, Sinai residents, Nubians, country folk, city dwellers, men, women, old and young."

The structure of the movement is essentially decentralized. As of 2013, there are two principal bodies that the movement consists of: the 17-member executive bureau and the 60-70-member council of trustees. The former serves as the administrative core of the Popular Current and consists of youth leaders and activists who were either heavily involved in Sabahi's presidential campaign or leading members of left-leaning groupings such as the Egyptian Social Democratic Party and the Youth for Freedom and Justice. The executive bureau is responsible for coordinating and managing major activities. The council of trustees plays an advisory role and is particularly responsible with advising executive members on certain documents. Its members are largely drawn from contributors to Sabahi's presidential campaign and are primarily specialists in various fields relating to the movement's political platform.

Members and leaders of other political parties are able to join while still operating with their respective factions. The purpose of this flexibility is to foster the expansion of grassroots support throughout Egypt's urban and rural areas. Unlike most Egyptian political parties, the Popular Current's stated objectives were intended to reach beyond Egypt's political sphere, encompassing the fields of development, the economy, culture and sports. There was initial debate among the leadership on whether the Popular Current should become a political party or a movement, with the latter option being preferred. However, the lack of financial resources has hindered the geographic reach of the Popular Current. Its members have generally focused on organizing anti-government demonstrations, while neglecting to work on the party's internal organization. According to Nadine Abdallah, the absence of sustainable funding and the lack of internal management has "reduced the Popular Current to a protest movement."

== Views ==
The Popular Current's stances are virtually identical to Sabahi's: the achievement of social justice by instituting minimum and maximum wages in the public sector, the guarantee of personal and political freedoms, the establishment of a strong democratic system, the adoption of an independent foreign policy including the re-establishment of Egypt's historical role as a leading regional power and stringent opposition to interference in Egypt's domestic affairs by various world powers.

== Incidents involving supporters ==
On 5 December, members of the Popular Current Mohamed Essam and Karam Gergis were murdered in the clashes surrounding Heliopolis Palace between protestors against the new Constitution and Muslim Brotherhood members, which attacked the demonstrators with Molotov cocktails. On 4 February 2013, Mohamed el-Gendy, a member of the Popular Current allegedly tortured by the police following his arrest at Tahrir Square on 27 January, died in the Helal hospital due to his grave injuries.

== Popular Current Party ==
Popular Current Party
- Spokesperson: Ahmed Kamel Al-Beheri
- Founded: 21 September 2014
- Dissolved: March 2016
- Merged into: Dignity Party
- National affiliation: Civil Democratic Current

On 21 September 2014 the movement formed a political party, the Popular Current Party. Sabahi will not lead the party. A spokesman of the party, Hossam Moanes, has criticized the Egyptian protest law. It boycotted the 2015 Egyptian parliamentary election. It merged with the Dignity Party in March 2016.

== Electoral history ==
=== Presidential elections ===
Election	Party candidate	Votes	%	Result
2014	Hamdeen Sabahi	757,511	3.09%	Lost ✗

== See also ==
- Dignity Party (Egypt)
