= Socialist Party of Egypt =

The Egyptian Socialist Party الحزب الاشتراكي المصري
- Chairman: Ahmed Bahaa El-Din Shaaban
- Founders: Samir Amin; Ahmed Bahaa El-Din Shaaban; Mamdouh Habashi; Eman Yehia
- Founded: 18 June 2011
- Headquarters: Cairo
- Ideology: Democratic socialism
- Political position: Left-wing
- Colours: Red
- House of Representatives: 0 / 568

Website
- http://egyptian-socialist-party.org/

The Egyptian Socialist Party (Arabic: الحزب الاشتراكي المصري, romanized: El-Hizb El-Ishtiraki El-Masri) is a political party in Egypt which was founded by some Egyptian socialists after the 2011 Egyptian revolution.

== History and profile ==
The party was founded on 18 June 2011 at a conference attended by over 400 Egyptian & international socialists. Members such as Karima El-Hefnawy and chairman Ahmed Bahaa El-Din Shaaban were prominent leaders of the Kefaya movement.

Party member Mamdouh Habashi stated that the Egyptian Socialist Party saw "the uprising of January 25 not as the revolution, but just the start of a new, long revolutionary tide."

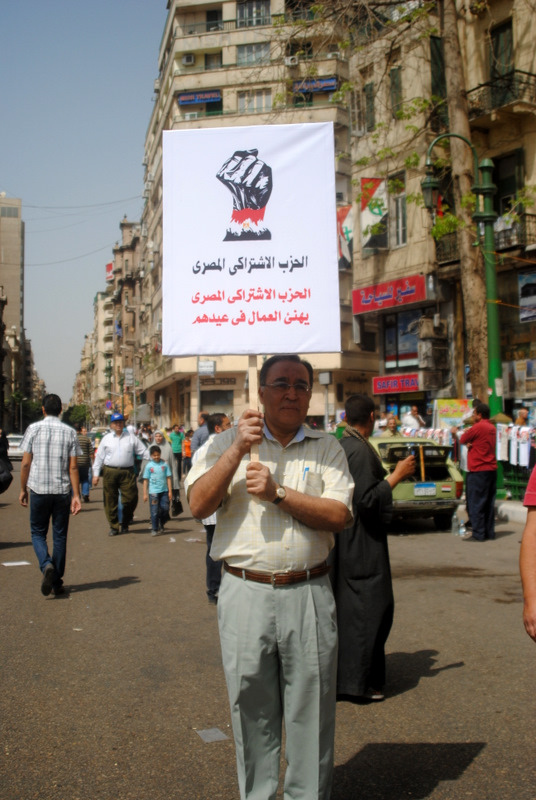
Banner from the Egyptian Socialist Party

The party has a membership of over 1000, with branches established in cities such as Mansoura, Aswan and Luxor as well as Cairo and Alexandria.

In addition to involvement with the ongoing protests in Tahrir Square, members of the Egyptian Socialist Party are also involved with such issues as the rights of inhabitants of informal settlements in Cairo, and helped in organising protests and strikes amongst these communities in August 2011. Other areas that party members within include independent trade unions and environmental issues.

On 10 May 2011, the Egyptian Socialist Party agreed to enter into a Coalition of Socialist Forces with four other Egyptian leftist groups called, which includes the Revolutionary Socialists, the Socialist Popular Alliance Party, the Egyptian Communist Party and the Workers Democratic Party. For the 2011-2012 parliamentary election, the Egyptian Socialist Party joined the "Revolution Continues" alliance. The party had originally entered the Egyptian Bloc alliance, but withdrew shortly before the elections. Party chairman Ahmed Bahaa El-Din Shaaban stated that the reason for the decision was due to "remnants of the old regime in some of the parties under the bloc". Egyptian Socialist Party list leader Karima El-Hefnawy was one of only two female candidates at the head of a list standing in the elections.
