= Building and Development Party =

Political party in Egypt

Building and Development Party حزب البناء والتنمية El-Benaa Wa El-Tanmia
- Chairman: Tarek al-Zumar
- Founded: 20 June 2011
- Ideology: Islamism; Economic liberalism Conservatism
- Political position: Centre-right
- National affiliation: National Legitimacy Support Coalition
- House of Representatives: 0 / 568

The Building and Development Party (Arabic: حزب البناء والتنمية, romanized: Hizb el-Benaa wa el-Tanmia, alternatively translated as Construction and Development Party) is an Islamist political party in Egypt.

== History ==
Initiated by the al-Gama'a al-Islamiyya ("Islamic Group"), it is seen as the political wing of the movement. The party was established on 20 June 2011, following the 2011 Egyptian revolution, and officially endorsed by the Supreme Administrative Court on 10 October 2011. The Building and Development Party has participated in the 2011–12 Egyptian parliamentary election as part of the Alliance for Egypt (known as the Islamist Bloc), led by the Salafist Al-Nour Party, with the Authenticity Party also participating. The possible dissolution of the party is being investigated by the Political Parties Affairs Committee.

According to its manifesto, the party stands for a representative democracy with institutions guided by the principles of the Sharia, while rejecting any form of theocracy. Moreover, it favours a free economy and questions the size of the public sector. Among the party's ranks is Abbud al-Zumar, who was imprisoned for nearly twenty years for involvement in the assassination of the Egyptian president Anwar Sadat.

The group has accepted the resignation of Assem Abdel Magued following his incitement against the Egyptian military; the organization has expressed its commitment to peace following the coup that toppled Mohamed Morsi. The party considered leaving the Anti-Coup Alliance; it has called for reconciliation with the Sisi administration. al-Gama'a al-Islamiyya, the parent organization of the party, is considering participating in the 2015 parliamentary election.

== Electoral history ==
=== People's Assembly elections ===
Election	Seats	+/–
2011–12 (as part of Islamist Bloc)	13 / 596	▲13

== Lawsuit against Islamic parties ==
The Building and Development Party is one of the eleven Islamic parties targeted by a lawsuit in November 2014, when an organization named Popular Front for opposing the Brotherhoodization of Egypt sought to dissolve all political parties established "on a religious basis." The Alexandria Urgent Matters Court however ruled on 26 November 2014 that it lacked jurisdiction.

== See also ==
- List of Islamic political parties
