= Constitution Party (Egypt) =

Egyptian political party

Constitution Party حزب الدستور El-Dostour Party
- President: Wafaa Sabry
- Founder: Mohamed ElBaradei
- Founded: 28 April 2012
- Headquarters: Cairo
- Think tank: National Association for Change
- Ideology: Liberalism (Egyptian); Social liberalism Big tent
- Political position: Centre-left
- National affiliation: Civil Democratic Movement; Free Path Alliance
- Colors: Blue green
- Slogan: "Bread, Freedom, Social Justice" (Arabic: عيش حرية عدالة أجتماعية)
- House of Representatives: 0 / 568

Website
- www.aldostourparty.org

The Constitution Party (Arabic: حزب الدستور, romanized: Ḥizb el-Dostour) is a political party in Egypt. Founded by Nobel Peace Prize laureate Mohamed ElBaradei in 2012, it aims to protect and promote the principles and objectives of the 2011 Egyptian revolution, according to liberal ideals.

== Background ==
The party was launched on 28 April 2012 by Mohamed ElBaradei and a group of Egyptian intellectuals and activists. ElBaradei described that the aim of the party was "to save the great 25 January revolution, which has been derailed and is almost aborted, and to restore our unity." The party was seen as a moderate force to counter emerging Islamist gains. ElBaradei said that he intended to increase the party's base for the next election in four years time. The party aims to unite all Egyptians, regardless of creed or ideology, behind democracy.

ElBaradei hoped the party would attract, in particular, the young people who were behind the uprising that toppled President Mubarak.

== History ==
The Constitution Party has attracted a youthful membership, with over 85% of its membership being under the age of 35. Youth leaders of the Constitution Party have at times expressed differences with party leadership, contributing to the internal dynamics influencing the party's development.

54 members of the party resigned in Alexandria in October 2013. The same month, eleven members of the party resigned, including founding member George Isaac and former solidarity minister Ahmed Borai, who served in the Beblawi Cabinet.

The Constitution Party supported the Tamarod movement and the removal of President Mohamed Morsi in June 2013. ElBaradei was appointed interim vice president by Adly Mansour but resigned one month later, in August 2013, over the use of violence against pro-Muslim Brotherhood protesters. The resignation led to distancing between the Constitution Party and the party founder. A number of Constitution leaders resigned from the party after ElBaradei's resignation from the interim vice presidency. ElBaradei is no longer involved with the party though he was named honorary president of the party on 22 February 2014.

The former spokesman of the party, Khaled Dawoud, was stabbed on 4 October 2013. A day later his condition had improved.

The party announced an official neutral position on the January 2014 constitutional referendum but strongly encouraged Egyptians to participate.

Hala Shukrallah was elected to lead the Constitution Party in February 2014, and became "the first woman – and first Christian – to lead a major Egyptian party." She won the election with 108 votes, compared to 57 votes for Gameela Ismail and 23 votes for Hossam Abdel-Ghafar, with two spoiled ballots. The party voted to endorse Hamdeen Sabahi in May 2014 ahead of the 2014 presidential election, with 59.3% voting in favor, 28.6% voting for a boycott, 10.1% voting to endorse president Abdel Fattah el-Sisi, and 2% selecting a different candidate. Shukrallah's February decision to boycott the 2015 Egyptian parliamentary election was met with criticism and some resignations from the party. She resigned from the position in August 2015.

Party elections, which began in June 2015, were postponed. Four different lists prepared to run in the election; Mohamed El-Gamal was affiliated with "Together We Can", Ahmed Metwally ran on the "Why Not" list, Tamer Gomaa was part of the “We Will Develop Alternatives” list and Ahmed Bayoumi was the head of the “Change Comes Through Proper Thinking” list. Dawoud and prominent party figure Ismail supported El-Gamal.

Dawoud announced in September 2015 that the members of the party voted in favor of participating in the election. The Together We Can list was opposed to participating until internal elections took place.

The party was expected to hold a leadership election in November 2016, though the "high committee" of the party was unable to reach a quorum.

Dawoud won a party leadership election held in January 2017, in which he was the only candidate.

Gameela Ismail won a leadership election that was held in July 2022, defeating Dawoud.

The party allied with the Conservative Party and formed the Free Path Alliance ahead of the 2025 Egyptian parliamentary election.

It will hold a leadership election in 2026, with the window for nominations starting on 25 January. Ismail does not expect to be a candidate. Wafaa Sabry was elected president of the party around May 2026.

== Electoral history ==
=== House of Representatives elections ===
Election	Seats	+/–
2025	0 / 596	▲0

== Platform ==
The Constitution Party "aims to build a new Egypt based on democratic governance, education, competence, experience and the rule of law." Respect for human rights, advancing the Egyptian economy, providing for the basic needs of citizens, and advancing social equality are among the party's primary goals. The principles of the party are summarized in its slogan, "Bread, Freedom, and Social Justice."

== Organization ==
Tamer Gomaa served as the secretary general of the party until his resignation in August 2016.

A committee within the party, called The Wise Ones, is used to resolve disputes.

== Leaders ==
Leader		Took office	Left office
1	Mohamed ElBaradei	2012	July 2013
2	Sayyed Kassem (acting)	July 2013	February 2014
3	Hala Shukrallah	February 2014	April 2015
4	Tamer Gomaa (acting)	?	July 2016 or July 2018
5	Khaled Dawoud (disputed)	January 2017	
6	Ahmed Bayoumi	March 2017	?
7	Alaa El-Khayam	February 2019	?
8	Gameela Ismail	July 2022	ca. May 2026
9	Gameela Ismail	ca. May 2026	Present

== See also ==
- List of major liberal parties considered left
- List of political parties in Egypt
