= Dignity Party (Egypt) =

Dignity Party (Egypt): حزب الكرامة; Ḥizb al-Karāma
- Chairman: Sayed El-Toukhy
- Founders: Amin Iskander; Hamdeen Sabahi
- Founded: 1996
- Split from: Arab Democratic Nasserist Party
- Headquarters: Cairo
- Newspaper: Al-Karama
- Ideology: Nasserism
- Political position: Left-wing
- National affiliation: Democratic Alliance for Egypt (2011-2012); Civil Democratic Movement; National Front Alliance (2015)
- Colors: Green
- House of Representatives: 0 / 568

The Dignity Party (Arabic: حزب الكرامة, romanized: Ḥizb al-Karāma) is an Egyptian left-wing Nasserist political party founded in 1996 by Amin Iskander and Hamdeen Sabahi.

== History ==
The party first gained parliamentary seats in the 2005 Egyptian parliamentary election; in 2011, the party joined the Democratic Alliance for Egypt, which won a majority of seats in that election. The party's leader and presidential candidate, Hamdeen Sabahi, came in third in the 2012 election and did not advance to the June runoff.

In late 2012, Sabahi left the party to form the Egyptian Popular Current. Many Dignity party members left to join Sabahi's new party.

The party joined the National Front Alliance ahead of the 2015 Egyptian parliamentary election.

In March 2016, the Popular Current Party merged into the Dignity Party.

Ahmed Tantawi was elected chairman of the party on 25 December 2020, replacing Mohamed Samy. Tantawi left the position in July 2022. The leader of the party as of May 2025 is Sayed El-Toukhy.

== Electoral history ==
=== Presidential elections ===
Election	Party candidate	Votes	%	Result
2012	Hamdeen Sabahi	4,820,273	20.72%	Lost ✗

=== House of Representatives ===
Election	Seats		Government
Election	Seats	+/-	Government
2005	2 / 454	▲2	Opposition
2010	0 / 518	▼2	N/A
2011	6 / 508	▲6	As part of Democratic Alliance for Egypt
2015	0 / 596	▼6	N/A
2020	0 / 596	Steady	N/A
