= Socialist Popular Alliance Party =

Socialist Popular Alliance Party حزب التحالف الشعبي الاشتراكي Hizb Al-Tahalof Al-Shaeby Al-Ishtiraky
- President: Abu Al-Izz Al-Hariri
- General Secretary: Abdel Ghafar Shokr
- Founder: Mohamed Refaat El-Saeed
- Founded: 2011; 15 years ago
- Split from: National Progressive Unionist Rally Party
- Headquarters: Cairo
- Ideology: Democratic socialism Anti-capitalism; Anti-imperialism; Anti-Zionism
- Political position: Left-wing
- National affiliation: Civil Democratic Movement
- Colours: Desert sand
- House of Representatives: 0 / 568

Website
- eltahalof.com

The Socialist People's Alliance Party (Arabic: حزب التحالف الشعبي الإشتراكي Hizb Al-Tahalof Al-Shaeby Al-Ishtiraky, SPAP) is a leftist party in Egypt formed shortly after the Egyptian Revolution of 2011.

== History ==
Its membership comprises many leftist organisations, mainly former members of the National Progressive Unionist Rally Party (the only formal leftist party under Hosni Mubarak's reign) who resigned, later joining the party after a split over the party's position on the November 2010 parliamentary elections. The party has been officially recognized on 3 September 2011.

The party initially joined the Egyptian Bloc ahead of the 2011–12 Egyptian parliamentary election, though it left the alliance and joined The Revolution Continues Alliance.

One of the founding members of the party, Fathy Ghareeb, died by suffocation provoked by the tear gas fired by the Central Security Forces (CSF) during the November 2012 Tahrir square clashes.

In November 2013, hundreds of members attempted to resign from the party over party elections as well as a lack of separation from the policies of the state; however, the resignations were rejected by party head Abdel Ghafar Shokr. The former members created the Bread and Freedom Party in late November 2013.

A 32-year-old member of the party named Shaimaa al-Sabbagh was shot in the head and killed by police in Cairo on 24 January 2015.

== Electoral history ==
=== People's Assembly elections ===
Election	Seats	+/–
2011–12 (as part of The Revolution Continues Alliance)	7 / 596	▲7
