= 2016–17 Egyptian protests =

The 2016-2017 Egyptian protests was a mass protest movement and political unrest movement against president Abdel Fattah Al-Sisi and his reforms, government and many other core issues. The first and major issue was massive corruption and the selling of Tiran and Sanafir to Saudi Arabia. Thousands chanted slogans depicting the government and demonstrations escalated. Live bullets were fired on peaceful demonstrators on 26 April, after nearly 2 months of wealthy protests. A deadly crackdown was used on protests. A wave of protests also hit areas like Alexandria, Port Said, Asyut, Faiyum, Giza and so on. Then, worker protests and strikes struck Cairo after a corruption scandal leak involving some workers. After the wave of civil unrest, massive bread protests took place in March 2017. They were met with tear gas and water cannon as stones was thrown at police. The protest movement led to the deaths of 2 protesters.

== See also ==
- Egyptian revolution of 2011
- 2012–2013 Egyptian protests
- Post-coup unrest in Egypt (2013–2014)
