= Yehia Galal =

Egyptian judge

- يحيى جلال
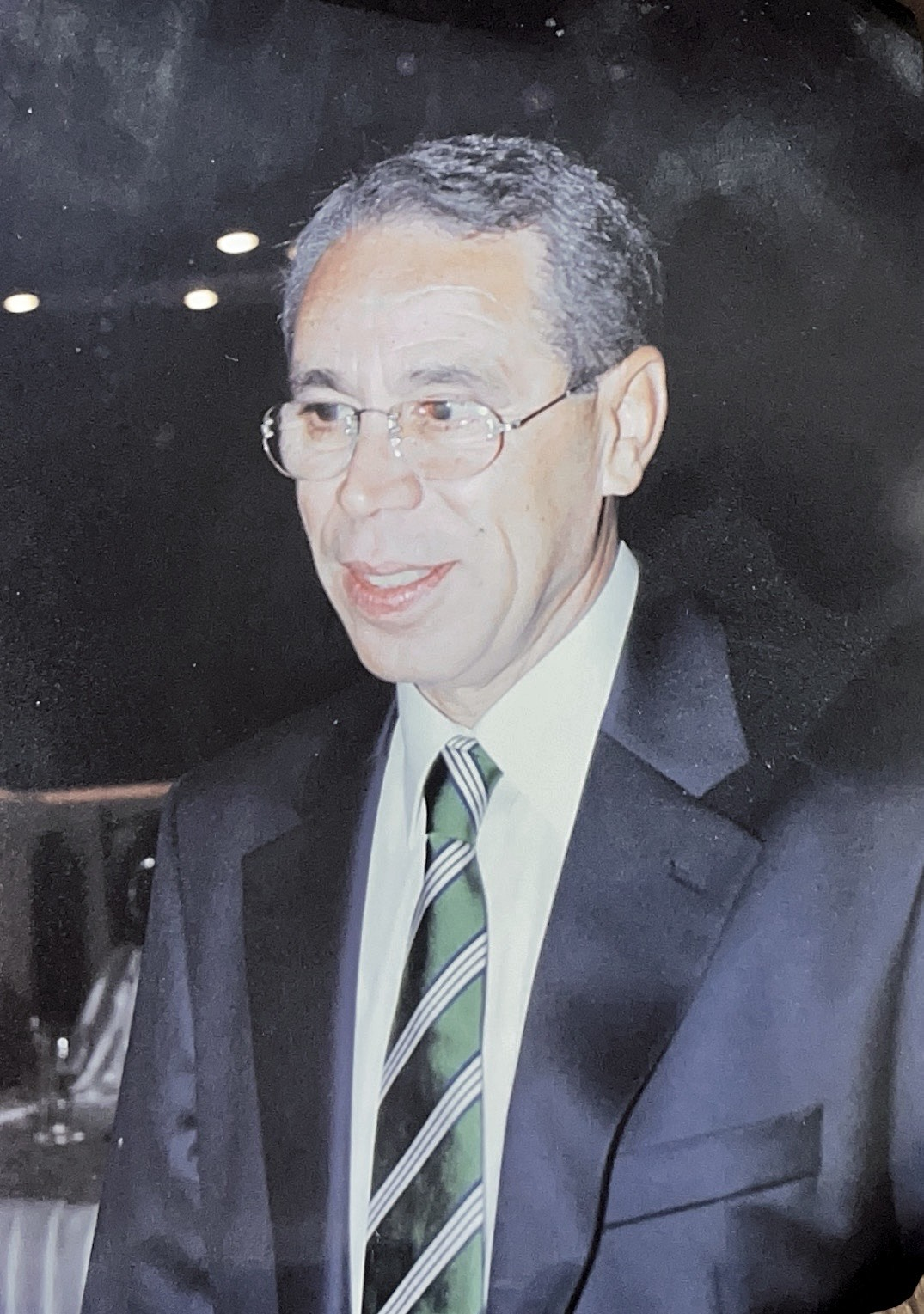
- Yehia Galal (pictured)

Head of Illicit Gains Authority

Personal details
- Born: Egypt
- Died: Egypt
- Spouse: Hanaa Mahgoub
- Children: Unconfirmed
- Occupation: Judge, public official
- Known for: Anti-corruption oversight, public service

Yehia Galal Fadl Aly was an Egyptian judge who served as the head of the Illicit Gains Authority (IGA), a governmental body tasked with investigating corruption and unlawful enrichment among public officials. Galal played a pivotal role in Egypt's judicial reform in 2006 and Egypt's post-2011 revolution anti-corruption efforts, targeting prominent figures from the regime of former President Hosni Mubarak. He is speculated to have passed away around 2020–2021 due to lung cancer.

== Career ==
=== Judicial Reform and Independence (2006) ===
During his tenure as Vice President of the Alexandrian Cassation Court, Yehia Galal played a pivotal role in Egypt's judicial reform movement of the early 2000s. He was a central figure in the 2006 judicial crisis, aligning with reformist judges like Assem Abdel Gabbar and Nagi Dirbala to publicly challenge executive interference and defend the independence of the judiciary.

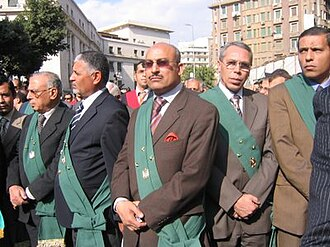
Yehia Galal (4th man on the right), standing in protest with fellow judges.

Galal's criticism of electoral corruption and public support for greater judicial autonomy drew political backlash. He was summoned for investigation by the head of the Cassation Court at the time, Fathi Khalifa, due to statements made during media appearances that condemned state practices and endorsed transparency. With mounting pressure, including reported retaliation that affected his prospects in the niyaba, Galal remained outspoken, advocating for institutional integrity and the rule of law. His actions contributed to a broader shift within the judiciary, helping to establish

judges as active participants in Egypt's civil and political reform landscape.

=== Leadership of Illicit Gains Authority ===
Yehia Galal assumed his position as head of the Illicit Gains Authority of Egypt on October 1, 2012, succeeding Counselor Assem Al-Gohary. As head of the Illicit Gains Authority, Galal led investigations into illicit wealth accumulation by former government officials. In October 2012, he ordered the arrest of Fathi Sorour, the former Speaker of the People's Assembly, after Sorour failed to appear for questioning regarding his financial disclosures. Galal's tenure also saw the IGA iss

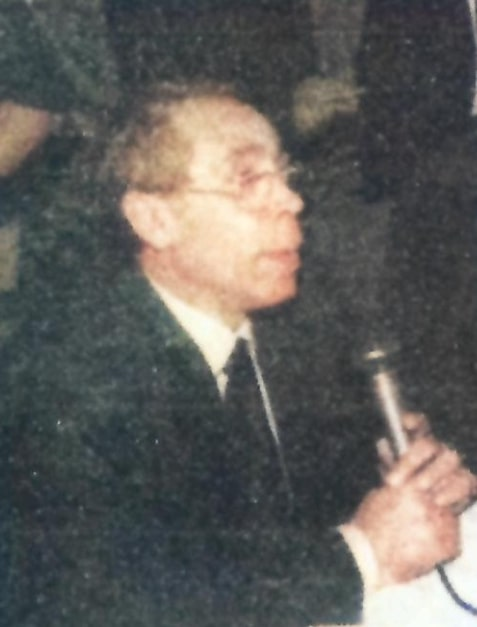
Yehia Galal, speaking at an event.

ue arrest warrants and impose travel bans on other prominent figures. In October 2012, an arrest warrant was issued for Ibrahim Nafaa, former editor-in-chief of the state-run Al-Ahram newspaper, over allegations of exploiting his position to amass wealth disproportionate to his income. Similarly, the IGA imposed a travel ban on Samir Ragab, former editor-in-chief of Al-Gomhouriya, due to accusations of illicit gains.

Under Galal's leadership, the IGA also froze the assets of Hosni Mubarak, as well as former presidential candidate Ahmed Shafik as part of ongoing corruption investigations. His role was widely covered in local Egyptian media for his commitment to transparency and the legal pursuit of former regime officials.

During the 2010s, Yehia Galal remained an influential figure in Egypt's legal system. In 2017, Galal joined the legal defense team for Judges Asim Abdel-Gabbar and Hisham Raouf, who faced disciplinary proceedings over their involvement in drafting anti-torture legislation with a civil society group. The case drew national attention, as the judges were accused of engaging in politics in violation of judicial rules.

== Legacy ==
Yehia Galal's efforts significantly contributed to transitional justice in post-revolution Egypt, aiming to address corruption and ensure accountability for former regime officials. His legal actions against high-profile figures were part of broader efforts to establish the rule of law and combat corruption in Egypt.

== Personal life ==
Yehia Galal was married to Hanaa Mahgoub. They had two daughters, whose names are not confirmed.

Galal is speculated to have died around 2020–2021 from lung cancer. As of 2025, there is no reliable source to evidence his death,

other than public wikis.

== See also ==
- Egyptian Revolution of 2011
- Hosni Mubarak
- Fathi Sorour
