= University on the Square =

Documentation project

The University on the Square: Documenting Egypt's 21st Century Revolution is a documentation project by the American University in Cairo (AUC) to collect web content, videos, photographs, personal accounts, oral histories and memorabilia related to the Egyptian Revolution of 2011. The project's objective is to increase public awareness of the Egyptian Revolution and preserve the events of January 25. The memorabilia, oral history, photograph, and video collections are composed of AUC community submitted media that are attributed under the Creative Commons Attribution license. Students and faculty may also record testimonials and share their experiences in the revolution. The University on the Square: Documenting Egypt's 21st Century Revolution project is supported by a grant from the Andrew W. Mellon Foundation.

== Memorabilia ==
The project collects memorabilia related to the revolution and provides online photographs of the objects.

== Oral Histories ==
Students and faculty may provide recorded testimonials of the events as they are related to their lives. AUC professor Kim Fox who is in charge of collecting the oral history comments saying: "Historically, oral histories have been important in adding texture to events and issues. We hope to do the same by adding to AUC's oral history archives with AUCians experiences with the Egyptian revolution".

== Photographs ==
Users submit photographs through the online submission page. The photographs are reviewed, documented, then put on display on the project's website.

== Video Recordings ==
AUC community members who have video recordings captured through their phones or digital cameras can upload these videos to the website.

== Web Archive ==
The project also created a Web Archive of websites related to the Egyptian revolution using the Archive-It web archiving tool. Archived news pages include Al Jazeera, Daily News Egypt, BBC, CNN, MSNBC and Newsweek. To preserve the personal accounts of the revolution some Twitter pages and blogs are also preserved.
