= Ahmed Seada =

- أحمد سعده
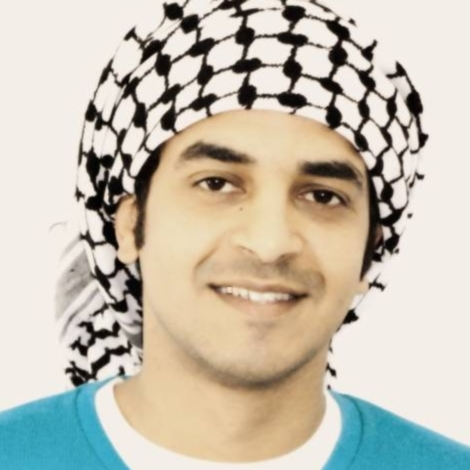
- Born: 5 March 1983 (age 43); Egypt
- Education: Tanta university

Ahmed Ragab Seada (Arabic: أحمد سعده) is a human rights activist and a labor leader in the petroleum sector, and occupies the Executive Director of the National Organization of modern human rights and human development in Egypt.

== 25 January revolution ==
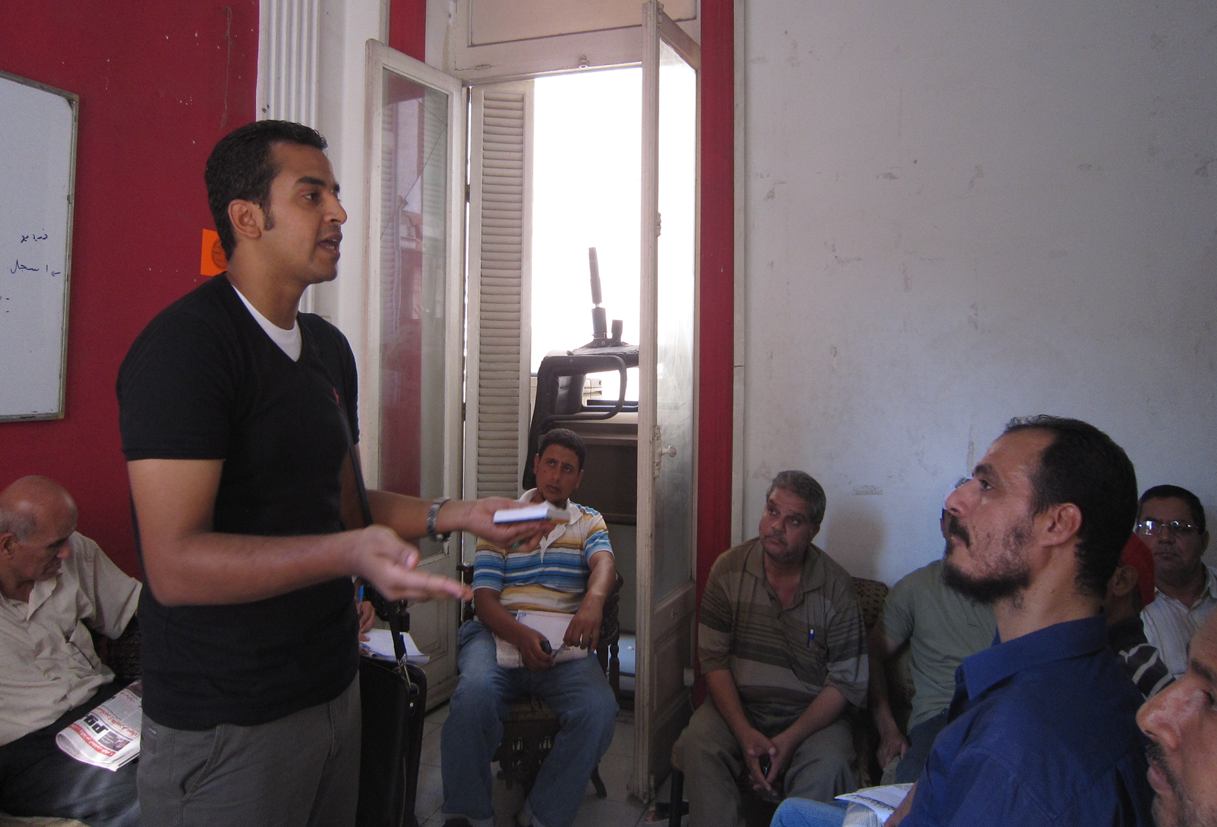
Lecture activist Ahmed Saada about workers and revolution

25 January saw the stepping down a wave of strikes spread, carrier revolution main demand the fall of Mubarak. On Tuesday, 8 February, after the announcement of Suez port workers strike While what was needed reforms besieging Parliament and the Council of Ministers, led by Ahmed Seada more than 4,000 oil workers strike, demanding higher wages and labor guarantees. They were joined by a rapid public transport workers and textile workers and staff and health workers. By Thursday 10 February were strikes have spread from Alexandria to Aswan. And encourages strikers uprising of the masses, raising new economic demands. They went so far as through direct confrontation of a dictatorship, demanding the fall of the regime.

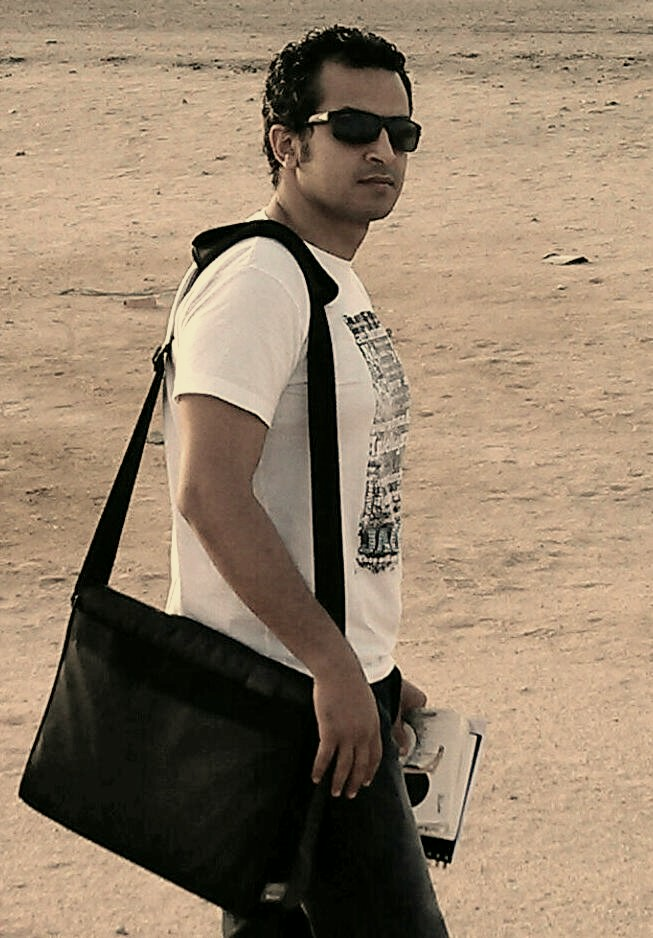
أحمد سعده

== Petroleum workers after the revolution ==
=== "Decades pass without something happen, and there are weeks in which he talked contracts" ===
This was the case for tens of years in the petroleum sector, the absence of equality was the theme obvious but Seada exploited uprising workers initiated with workers Petrotrade on 6 February 2011 and distributed data urges wider participation of the workers, causing workers Epsco then workers Botajmasco then workers Syanko to strikers to impose their demands on officials petroleum sector who have tried several ways to circumvent and circumvent their demands, entered sector leaders and officials from the state and the military junta in multiple meetings with Ahmed Saada to find compromises, but triumphed strike after picket lasted for twenty-one days, where workers earn an increase in wages by 375%, to be the biggest victory for the workers' picket in the history of the labor movement in Egypt

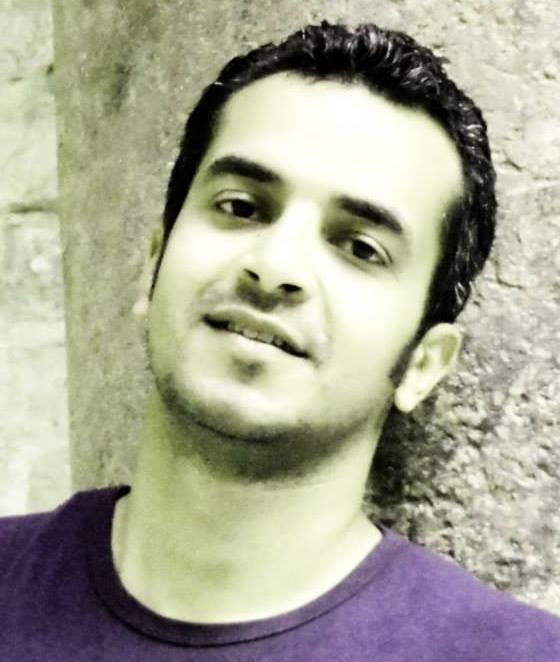
Ahmed Seada

== Post-Mubarak ==
After the revolution, increased tension between the workers and the system and here began Ahmed Saada in spreading awareness Worker And political between workers, The role has emerged as one of the Rejectionists to export gas to Israel, On 5 March 2011 he participated in the storming of the State Security building in Nasr City and wrote on one of its walls, leaving his signature: For the first time celebrating my birthday

Was arrested several times, most recently on 3 October 2011 during its solidarity with the people of Duwaiqa in front of the Council of Ministers, Aggression him By military police and smash his telephone And his camera and then Arrested him But was released quickly under pressure from his colleagues.To be the third time that arrested the Saada after his arrest in 2003 when he was a student during his participation in the student demonstrations against for [the invasion of Iraq, and the second time in 2006 where he was arrested during the distribution of CDs attacking the Egyptian role duringwar on Lebanon .

== Newspaper articles Ahmed Saada ==
Wrote several newspaper articles and research, including:

- "Legend of the army and the people supported one". Alhewar.
- "Where the conflict takes us??". Alhewar.
- "Egyptian revolution may get sick but do not die". Alhewar.
- "Egyptian society between the current situation and future prospects". Journal Al Fajr.
- "Egyptian revolution awaiting the dawn of democracy". Journal Al Fajr.
- "The revolution will triumph when we destroy that State". Journal Al Fajr.
- "The nightmare of a religious state". Journal Al Fajr. Archived from the original on 14 June 2013.
- "Is the revolution lost compass .. ??". Journal Al Fajr. Archived from the original on 15 June 2013.
- "Revolution and counter-revolution – whichever wins??". Journal Al Fajr. Archived from the original on 14 June 2013.
- "Civil war in Egypt is at stake". .. Journal Home. Archived from the original on 6 January 2013.
- "Message to the President". .. Journal Home. Archived from the original on 4 March 2016.
- "Constitution masters". .. Journal Home. Archived from the original on 29 December 2012.
- "Sorry. Egyptian identity, not sectarian". .. Seventh Day Journal. Archived from the original on 15 August 2011.
- "Who will be the next god ??". .. Al Fajr.

== See also ==
- Alaa Abd El-Fattah
- Wael Khalil
- Youssef Darwish
