= Corruption in Egypt =

Egypt has laws in place to criminalize various forms of corruption, including extortion, embezzlement and bribery, but they are poorly enforced. Recently it ranked 130/182 on the Corruption Perceptions Index (CPI), and 135/142 on the Rule of Law Index.

== Corruption in the economy ==
Businesses with more informal connections within the government receive preferential treatment when navigating through Egypt's regulatory framework, creating a disincentive for competition. An inefficient and sporadically enforced legal system, combined with a widespread culture of corruption, leaves businesses reliant on the use of middlemen known as wasta to operate, while well-connected businesses enjoy privileged treatment.

Facilitation payments are an established part of 'getting things done', despite irregular payments and gifts being criminalized. Facilitation payments are regarded as bribery in many countries, which prevents many foreign entities from financial involvement with Egypt, since they are a required part of doing business. Corruption makes the costs of both local goods and imports higher, decreasing the purchasing power of individuals, which magnifies poverty.

However, with the new 2016 Investment Law signed in March 2016 under the Minister of Investment and International Cooperation Sahar Nasr (government of Sherif Ismail) under the presidency of Abdel Fattah el-Sisi, the business scene has seen more flexibility. The law aims to reduce stifling bureaucracy in order to attract more investors, which has seen growth in investment in Egypt.

== Corruption in the government ==
On Transparency International's 2025 CPI, Egypt scored 30 on a scale from 0 ("highly corrupt") to 100 ("very clean"). When ranked by score, Egypt ranked 130th among the 182 countries in the Index, where the country ranked first is perceived to have the most honest public sector. For comparison with regional scores, the best score among Middle Eastern and North African countries (Note: Algeria, Bahrain, Egypt, Iran, Iraq, Israel, Jordan, Kuwait, Lebanon, Libya, Morocco, Oman, Qatar, Saudi Arabia, Syria, Tunisia, United Arab Emirates, and Yemen) was 69, the average was 39 and the worst was 13. For comparison with worldwide scores, the best score was 89 (ranked 1), the average was 42, and the worst was 9 (ranked 181 in a two-way tie).

== Attempts at reform ==
Historically, the gap between legislation and enforcement has hampered the government's efforts to fight corruption.

=== Mubarak ===
Prior to the 2011 revolution, critics agreed that corruption in Egypt was widespread and that anti-corruption measures were perceived to be mere cosmetic changes serving Mubarak's political agenda. However, in the last year of President Mubarak's 30-year presidency, in 2010, the "National coordination committee for combatting Corruption" was created but was amended by a Prime Minister decree (No 493) signed by PM Ibrahim Mahlab in 2014 to provide justice, equality, and equal opportunities.

=== Morsi ===
The uprisings spurred a whirlwind of official corruption cases as well as the trials of several ministers and businessmen with ties to the former regime. The government under the Morsi administration claimed to focus its efforts on the fight against corruption and included several anti-corruption initiatives in the new 2012 constitution. But soon after the constitutional amendment in 2012, initiatives started to develop slowly, resulting in complete neglect before the 2013 revolution erupted on June 30.

The Constitution stipulated, among other provisions, the public's right to information, data, and documents. It also required an annual financial disclosure from Parliament members. Furthermore, the government created an anti-corruption commission designed to deal with standards of integrity and transparency in government and address conflicts of interest.

=== El-Sisi ===
In terms of enforcement, more happened under the Sisi regime, with one highly publicized case of a judge who was accused of corruption and arrested the moment he resigned from his position. The judge committed suicide very soon thereafter. Under the presidency of Abdel Fattah el-Sisi, many attempts to arrest public figures accused of different forms of corruption have erupted, including ones against the main governorates' governors, as well as hospital directors. In 2014, as the first move for the president, a council for combating corruption was created and headed by the Prime Minister, during which high-profile officials get to review developments in the area of reducing corrupt practices.

== See also ==
- Crime in Egypt
