= Results of the 2011–12 Egyptian parliamentary election =

The following is a list of the people elected to the People's Assembly of Egypt in the 2011-2012 election.

== Parliamentary Positions ==
- Speaker of the People’s Assembly: Mohamed Saad Tawfik Al Katatni, Freedom and Justice
- First Deputy Speaker: Ashraf Thabit Saad Eddin Al-Sayed, al-Nour
- Second Deputy Speaker: Mohamed Abdel Aleem Dawoud, Al-Wafd
- Chairman of the Foreign Affairs Committee: Essam al-Din Mohamed al-Erian, Freedom and Justice
- Chairman of the Legislative Parliamentary Committee: Mahmoud Reda Abdel Aziz al-Khudairi, Independent (aligned with Freedom and Justice)
- Chairman of the National Security Committee: Abbas Mohamed Mohamed Mukhaimar, Freedom and Justice
- Chairman of the Health Committee: Akram Al-Mendoh Awad Al-Shaer, Freedom and Justice
- Chairman of the Education and Scientific Research Committee: Shaaban Ahmed Abdel-Alim, al-Nour
- Chairman of the Human Rights Committee: Mohamed Anwar Esmat Sadat, Reform and Development
- Chairman of the Economic Affairs Committee: Tarek Hassan al-Desouki, al-Nour
- Chairman of the Labor Committee: Saber Abu al-Fotouh Badawi al-Sayed, Freedom and Justice
- Chairman of the Youth Committee: Osama Yassin Abdel Wahab Mohamed, Freedom and Justice
- Chairman of the Arab Affairs Committee: Mohamed Saeed Ibrahim Idris, al-Karama
- Chairman of the Culture and Media Committee: Mohamed Abdel-Moneim Mahmoud Al-Sawy, al-Hadara

== Members of Egypt’s People’s Assembly ==
=== Proportional Representation List Seats (332 seats) ===
==== Cairo (36 seats) ====
===== First District (al-Sahel) =====
1. 01. Hazem Mohamed Farouk Abdel Khaleq (Professionals/Freedom and Justice)
2. 02. Rafat Hamed Tawfiq al-Adawi (Workers/ Freedom and Justice)
3. 03. Amin Suleiman Iskandar Suleiman (Professionals/al-Karama)
4. 04. Mohamed Abdul Rashid al-Sayyid Salameh (Workers/ Freedom and Justice)
5. 05. Emad Gad (Professionals/ Egyptian Social Democrat)
6. 06. Khalid Mohamed Abdel Aziz Shabaan (Workers/ al-Tagammu)
7. 07. Bassam Mohamed Kamel Hamid Nasr (Professionals/ Egyptian Social Democrat)
8. 08.Mamdouh Ahmed Ismail Ahmed (Professionals/ al-Asala)
9. 09. Mahmoud Abdullah Abdul Rasul (Workers/ al-Nour)
10. 10. Tariq Mohamed Sabiq al-Hussein (Workers/ al-Wafd)

===== Second District (Nasr City) =====
1. 11. Ahmed al-Imam Ali Abdel-Hamid (Workers/ Freedom and Justice)
2. 12. Abdel Basset Abdel Hay Mustafa Ismail (Workers/ Freedom and Justice)
3. 13. Mohamed Magdy Ali Hamid Qarqal (Professionals / Labor)
4. 14. Basil Mohamed Adel Ibrahim (Professionals/ Free Egyptians)
5. 15. Atef Mohamed Bayoumi Makhalif (Farmers / Free Egyptians)
6. 16. Adel Abd al-Maksoud al-Afifi (Professionals/ al-Asala)
7. 17. Majid Mohammad Sayid Musa (Workers/ al-Wasat)
8. 18. Margaret Aazar (Workers/ al-Wafd)

===== Third District (Qasr al-Nil) =====
1. 19. Wahid Mohamed Abdel al-Majid (Professionals/ Freedom and Justice)
2. 20. Adel Abdel-Ati Abdel-Hamid (Workers/ Freedom and Justice)
3. 21. Jamal Jinfi Jamal Ali (Professionals / Freedom and Justice)
4. 22. Ahmed Hassan Helmi Saeed (Professionals/ Free Egyptians)
5. 23. Ayman Taha Khalil Mohamed (Workers/ Free Egyptians)
6. 24. Ashraf Mustafa Hussein Ali (Professionals/ al-Nour)
7. 25. Ahmed Darwish (Workers/ al-Nour)
8. 26. Mohamed Hussein Mohamed al-Maliki (Workers/ al-Wafd)

===== Fourth District (Maadi) =====
1. 27. Osama Yassin Abdel Wahab Mohamed (Professionals/ Freedom and Justice)
2. 38. Al-Mohamedi Abdul Maqsoud Mohamed (Workers/ Freedom and Justice)
3. 29. Hatem Abu Bakr Ahmed Azzam (Professionals/ al-Hadara)
4. 30. Adel HamidMustafa (Workers/ Freedom and Justice)
5. 31. Mohamed Ahmed Atta Ammara (Professionals/ al-Nour)
6. 32. Mahmoud Gharib Abdel Hafez (Workers/ al-Nour)
7. 33. Ziad Abdel-Hamid al-Alimi (Professionals/ Egyptian Social Democrat)
8. 34. Mahmoud Ezz Al-Arab Mohamed Al-Sakka (Professionals/ al-Wafd)
9. 35. Abdul Hakim Ismael Eid (Workers/ Revolution Continues)
10. 36. Jamal Mustafa Abdul Muttalib Kassab (Workers/ al-Wasat)

==== Alexandria (16 seats) ====
===== First District (Montaza) =====
1. 37. Subhi Saleh Mousa Abu Assi (Professionals / Freedom and Justice)
2. 38. Saleh Noman Mubarak Bilal (Workers/ Freedom and Justice)
3. 39. Ashraf Thabit Saad Eddin Al-Sayed (Professionals/ al-Nour)
4. 40. Mohammad Ramadan Ali Younes (Farmers / al-Nour)
5. 41. Hosni Hafiz Ibrahim Mohamed (Workers/ al-Wafd)
6. 42. Ibrahim Abdel Wahab Muhyi al-Din Abu Ahmed (Professionals/ Free Egyptians)

===== Second District (Moharram Bey) =====
1. 43. Hussein Mohamed Ibrahim Hussein (Professionals / Freedom and Justice)
2. 44. Ahmed Gad al-Rab Mahmoud Ahmed (Workers/ Freedom and Justice)
3. 45. Hassan al-Borns Hussein Baddar (Professionals / Freedom and Justice)
4. 46. Karem Abdul Hamid Sadiq (Workers/ Freedom and Justice)
5. 47. Ahmed Khalil Abdul Aziz al-Khairallah (Professionals/ al-Nour)
6. 48. Ahmed Abdel Hamid Abdel-Hamid al-Sayed (Farmers / al-Nour)
7. 49. Talaat Marzouk Abdel Aziz Saad (Professionals/ al-Nour)
8. 50. Abul Izz Hasan Ali al-Hariri (Professionals/ Revolution Continues)
9. 51. Ali Mohamed Ahmed (Farmers / Free Egyptians)
10. 52. Hassan Abdul Aziz Ahmed Ali (Workers/ al-Wafd)

==== Assuit (16 seats) ====
===== First District (Assuit) =====
1. 53. Ali Ezz al-Din Thabit Ali (Professionals/ Freedom and Justice)
2. 54. Mahmoud Helmi Ibrahim Faris (Workers/ Freedom and Justice)
3. 55. Mohamed Hamed Ahmed Osman (Professionals / Freedom and Justice)
4. 56. Mahmoud Mohamed Mustafa Abdullah (Professionals/ al-Nour)
5. 57. Ahmed Mohamed Ahmed Rifai (Workers/ Building and Development)
6. 58. Mohammad al-Farghali Sherif al-Farghali (Professionals/ Egyptian Social Democrat)
7. 59. Helmi Samwa’il ‘Azar Sharqawi (Workers/ Egyptian Social Democrat)
8. 60. Ahmed Mansour Mahmoud Selim (Workers / al-Wafd)

===== Second District (al-Fath) =====
1. 61. Mohamed Abdel-Aziz Sayed Khalifa (Professionals / Freedom and Justice)
2. 62. Mumtaz Ahmed Ali Nasser (Farmers / Freedom and Justice)
3. 63. Farghali Mohamed Farghali Ahmed (Professionals / Freedom and Justice)
4. 64. Mohamed Ahmed Hussein Mahran (Professionals/ al-Nour)
5. 65. Hamada Imam Ahmed Attia (Workers/ al-Nour)
6. 66. Ziad Ahmed Bahaa al-Din Abdel Aal (Professionals/ Egyptian Social Democrat)
7. 67. Sana Ahmed Mohamed Gamal al-Din (Workers/ Egyptian Social Democrat)
8. 68. Ahmed Metwally Mohamed Nasr (Workers/ Reform and Development)

==== Luxor (4 seats) ====
1. 69. Abdel-Hamid al-Sanusi Ahmed Abdullah (Professionals / Freedom and Justice)
2. 70. Bahi-Din Mohamed Abdel Dayem Mansour (Workers/ Freedom and Justice)
3. 71. Al-Hassan Bakri Nubi Ahmed (Professionals/ al-Nour)
4. 72. Nasreddin Mahmoud Maghazi (Workers/ al-Tagammu)

==== Fayoum (12 seats) ====
===== First District (Fayoum) =====
1. 73. Ahmed Mohamed Abdul Rahman Abdul Hadi (Professionals / Freedom and Justice)
2. 74. Ahmed Ibrahim Bayoumi Sabra (Workers/ Freedom and Justice)
3. 75. Sami Salama Noman (Professionals / Freedom and Justice)
4. 76. Nasr Mahmoud Abbas (Workers / Freedom and Justice)
5. 77. Hamada Mohamed Sulieman Awdah (Professionals / al-Nour)
6. 78. Mustafa Abdel-Latif Mahmoud (Farmers / al-Nour)
7. 79. Nasreddin Sheriff Abdel Ati (Workers/ Revolution Continues)
8. 80. Yasser Abdel Tawab Salloum (Farmers / Freedom)

===== Second District (Al-Sunwirs) =====
1. 81. Ahmedi Qasem Mohammad Saad (Workers / Freedom and Justice)
2. 82. Hatem Abdel Azim Abu Hasab Ali (Professionals / Freedom and Justice)
3. 83. Owais Yasin Ali Awad (Farmers / al-Nour)
4. 84. Wajih Abdel Kader Shaaban (Professionals/ al-Nour)

==== Port Said (4 seats) ====
===== First District (al-Sharq) =====
1. 85. Ali Mohamed Mustafa Dora (Professionals/ Freedom and Justice)
2. 86. Aladdin Mahmoud Mahmoud Baha’i (Professionals / al-Nour)
3. 87. Rashid Mohamed Awad Hutaibah (Workers/ al-Wasat)
4. 88. Mohamed Kamal al-Din Mohamed Gad (Workers/ al-Wafd)

==== Damietta (8 seats) ====
===== First District (Damietta 1) =====
1. 89. Saber Abdel Sadiq Mohamed Saeed (Professionals / Freedom and Justice)
2. 90. Tarek Hassan al- Desouki (Professionals / al-Nour)
3. 91. Salah al-Said al-Kholi (Workers / al-Nour)
4. 92. Nasser Mustafa Shakir (Professionals / al-Nour)
5. 93. Mohamed Abdel Hamid Mohamed Al-Hadidi (Workers/ Freedom and Justice)
6. 94. Mohamed Shawky Mohamed Ahmed al-Banna (Workers/ Freedom and Justice)
7. 95. Essam Sultan (Professionals / al-Wasat)
8. 96. Hanan Saad Aboul Gheit Hassan (Workers/ al-Wafd)

==== Kafr Al-Sheikh (12 seats) ====
===== First District (Kafr al-Sheikh) =====
1. 97. Hassan Ali Abu She’sha Ali (Professionals / Freedom and Justice)
2. 98. Abdullah Ahmed Hamed Ahmed Hindawi (Workers/ Freedom and Justice)
3. 99. Nasri Saad Ibrahim Aldarnsa (Professionals / al-Karama)
4. 100. Al-Sayed Mustafa Hussein Khalifa (Professionals / al-Nour)
5. 101. Mohamed Faisal Mohamed Hossein Abedi (Workers/ al-Nour)
6. 102. Fawzi Ahmed Abdel Mohsen Hamid (Professionals / al-Nour)
7. 103. Mohamed Abdel Hakim Mohamed Hijazi (Workers/ al-Wafd)
8. 104. Mohamed Abdel Hamid Mohamed Hashem (Workers/ Reform and Development)

===== Second District (Desouk) =====
1. 105. Ragab Mohamed Mohamed Banna (Professionals / Freedom and Justice)
2. 106. Mustafa Mohamed Mustafa Daraz (Farmers / al-Nour)
3. 107. Yasser al-Baha Mohamed Barakat (Professionals / al-Wafd)
4. 108. Fathy Abdel Aziz Ibrahim Abdo (Workers/ Egypt National)

==== Red Sea (4 seats) ====
===== First District (Al-Qasir) =====
1. 109. Mohamed Awad Abdel-Aal Abdel Hamid (Professionals / Freedom and Justice)
2. 110. Zine al-Abidine Embarak Ali (Workers/ Freedom and Justice)
3. 111. Samih Fikri Makram Ebeid (Professionals / Free Egyptians Party)
4. 112. Shaaban Mohamed Ahmed Hussein (Workers/ Egyptian Citizen)

==== Beheira (20 seats) ====
===== First District (Damanhur) =====
1. 113. Mohamed Jamal Ahmed Hishmat (Professionals / Freedom and Justice)
2. 114. Mohamed Awad Abdul Ati Zayat (Workers/ Freedom and Justice)
3. 115. Mahdi Abdul Hamid Mohamed Qarsham (Workers/ Freedom and Justice)
4. 116. Mohamed Abdul Kafi Hamad Mansour (Farmers / Freedom and Justice)
5. 117. Zakaria Younis Abdel-Halim Mikhion (Professionals / al-Nour)
6. 118. Abd al-Aziz Abd Rabbo Abd al-Hamid (Farmers / al-Nour)
7. 119. Gamal Abdel Mohsen Ali Kreitim (Professionals / al-Nour)
8. 120. Ibrahim Ragheb Ibrahim Abdo (Workers/ al-Nour)
9. 121. Khalid Abdul Mawla Abdul Razek Khattab (Professionals / al-Nour)
10. 122. Wajih Abdel Fadil Issawi (Farmers / Free Egyptians Party)
11. 123. Yaqout Mohamed Yaqout al-Jamal (Professionals / al-Wafd)
12. 124. Adel Saad Gadallah Shaalan (Farmers / Egyptian Citizen)

===== Second District (Al-Dalnajat) =====
1. 125. Mohamed Ibrahim Abd al-Muttalib al-Hawari (Professionals / Freedom and Justice)
2. 126. Mohamed Shaaban Mohamed Issa (Farmers / Freedom and Justice)
3. 127. Mohamed Munib Ibrahim Geneidi (Professionals / al-Karama)
4. 128. Aladdin Saad Othman Amer (Professionals / al-Nour)
5. 129. Abdul Aziz Sobhi Abdul Aziz al-Amara (Farmers / al-Nour)
6. 130. Mohamed Hafiz Mohamed Numani (Professionals / al-Nour)
7. 131. Abdel-Fattah Mohamed Abdel Fattah Harash (Workers/ al-Wafd)
8. 132. Mohamed Shawqi Khalil Badr (Farmers / Union)

==== Giza (20 seats) ====
===== First District (Giza) =====
1. 133. Essam al-Din Mohamed al-Erian (Professionals / Freedom and Justice)
2. 134. Azab Mostafa Morsi Yaqout (Workers/ Freedom and Justice)
3. 135. Juma Mohamed Badri Mari (Professionals / Freedom and Justice)
4. 136. Ahmed Abd al-Sayed (Workers/ Freedom and Justice)
5. 137. Mohamed Abdel-Wahab Hassan Kurdi (Professionals / al-Nour)
6. 138. Abdel Bari Abu Ela Abdul Bari (Farmers / al-Nour)
7. 139. Ahmed Mohamed Ahmed Hamouda (Professionals / al-Nour)
8. 140. Salem Mohamed Abdel Majid Abu Shanab (Farmers / Free Egyptians)
9. 141. AbdulWahab Hassan Khalil (Professionals / al-Wafd)
10. 142. Muhyi al-Din Abdou Libna (Workers/ al-Wasat)

===== Second District (Al-Bulaq) =====
1. 143. Hilmi Al-Sayed Abd al-Aziz al-Jazzar (Professionals / Freedom and Justice)
2. 144. Khalid Mahmood Hamid Azhari (Workers/ Freedom and Justice)
3. 145. Kamal Mohamed Rifai Abu Eita (Professionals / al-Karama)
4. 146. Izzat Mohamed Ibrahim al-al-Jirf (Farmers / Freedom and Justice)
5. 147. Adel Yusuf Hassan Azzazi (Professionals / al-Nour)
6. 148. Nizar Mahmoud Abdul-Hamid Ghorab (Professionals / al-Nour)
7. 149. Farid Ali Hussein Ali (Farmers / al-Nour)
8. 150. Ayman Ahmed Hussein Abu al-Ela (Professionals / Egyptian Social Democrat)
9. 151. Abd al-Rahman Kamal Abbas (Workers/ al-Wafd)
10. 152. Mohamed Adly Issa (Workers/ al-Wasat)

==== Ismailia (4 seats) ====
1. 153. Hamdi Mohamed Mohamed Ismail (Professionals / Freedom and Justice)
2. 154. Aladdin Khalifa Omar Khalifa (Workers/ Freedom and Justice)
3. 155. Jamal Ali Ahmed Hassan (Professionals / al-Nour)
4. 156. Magda Hassan Al-Nouashi (Workers/ al-Wafd)

==== Al-Sharqiya (20 seats) ====
===== First District (Zagazig) =====
1. 157. Ahmed Al-Sayed Ahmed Shehata (Professionals / Freedom and Justice)
2. 158. Mo’min Mohamed Ahmed Zaarour (Workers/ Freedom and Justice)
3. 159. Rida Abdullah Mohamed Atwa (Professionals / Freedom and Justice)
4. 160. Adel Radwan Othman Mohamed (Workers/ Freedom and Justice)
5. 161. Mohamed Hussein Mohamed Sharaf (Professionals / al-Nour)
6. 162. Jamal Mohamed Ibrahim Metwally (Farmers / al-Nour)
7. 163. Walid Jooda Afifi (Professionals / al-Nour)
8. 164. Atef Mohamed Maghoori (Workers / Egyptian Social Democrat)
9. 165. Mohamed Hani Abdul Ghaffar Abaza (Professionals / al-Wafd)
10. 166. Badr Bara’a Zakher Noman (Workers/ al-Wasat)

===== Second District (Abu Kabir) =====
1. 167. Farid Ismail Abdel Halim Khalil (Professionals / Freedom and Justice)
2. 168. Ahmed Ali Ibrahim Ezz (Farmers / Freedom and Justice)
3. 169. Abbas Mohamed Mohamed Mukhaimar (Professionals / Freedom and Justice)
4. 170. Mahmoud Al-Sayed al-Wahid Abdel-Hamid (Workers/ Freedom and Justice)
5. 171. Ibrahim Abdel Aal Ibrahim Sayed (Professionals / al-Nour)
6. 172. Hisham Abdel-Aal Ibrahim Salem (Farmers / al-Nour)
7. 173. Talat Imad Eddin Sadiq Ahmed al-Sewedy (Professionals / al-Wafd)
8. 174. Mustafa Imam Mohamed Eidarous al-Hout (Farmers / al-Wafd)
9. 175. Majdi Sabri Abdul Rahim Elewa (Professionals / Free Egyptians)
10. 176. Saif Mohamed Rashad Salama (Farmers / Arab Egyptian Union)

==== Suez (4 seats) ====
1. 177. Ahmed Mahmoud Mohamed Ibrahim (Professionals / Freedom and Justice)
2. 178. Abd al-Khaliq Mohamed Abdul Khaliq Ibrahim (Professionals / al-Asala)
3. 179. Abbas Mohamed Abbas Jooda (Workers/ al-Nour)
4. 180. Hakim Suleiman Mohamed Hussein (Workers/ Free Egyptians)

==== Menoufia (16 seats) ====
===== First District (Shebin) =====
1. 181. Sabri Mohamed Amer Khader (Professionals / Freedom and Justice)
2. 182. Badr Abdel Aziz Mahmoud Al Falah (Farmers / Freedom and Justice)
3. 183. Mohamed Saeed Ibrahim Idris (Professionals / al-Karama)
4. 184. Salah Abd al-Maboud Fayed al-Sayed (Professionals / al-Nour)
5. 185. Atef Sayed Ahmed Yassin Qansa (Farmers / al-Nour)
6. 186. Isam Mohamed Abdel-Hamid Sabbahi (Farmers / al-Wafd)
7. 187. Ahmed Al-Sayed Sayed AbdelAal (Workers / Egypt National)
8. 188. Ahmed Refaat Mohamed Said (Farmers / Reform and Development)

===== Second District (Ashmoon) =====
1. 189. Ashraf Mahmoud Mohamed Badr al-Din (Professionals / Freedom and Justice)
2. 190. Abdul-Fattah Mahmoud Eid (Workers/ Freedom and Justice)
3. 191. Atiya Adlan Atiya Ramadan (Professionals / Freedom and Justice)
4. 192. Mohamed Kamel Mustafa Kamel (Professionals / al-Wafd)
5. 193. Mahmoud Abu Saud Morsi Reesh (Farmers / al-Wafd)
6. 194. Jamal Mansour Mohamed Abdul Nabi (Professionals / al-Nour)
7. 195. Shafiq Mohamed Mohamed Shaheen (Farmers / Egypt National)
8. 196. Hilmi Ibrahim Al-Sayed Murad (Workers/ Reform and Development)

==== Beni Suef (12 seats) ====
===== First District (Beni Suef) =====
1. 197. Hamdi Hussein Mohamed Zahran (Professionals / Freedom and Justice)
2. 198. Abdul Rahman Mohamed Shoukri Abdul Rahman (Farmers / Freedom and Justice)
3. 199. Mahmoud Saber Abdel Gawad Allam (Professionals / Freedom and Justice)
4. 200. Shaaban Ahmed Abdel-Alim (Professionals / al-Nour)
5. 201. Mohamed Mustafa Abdel-Hafiz (Farmers / al-Nour)
6. 202. Mohamed Mahrous Ahmed (Workers/ al-Nour)
7. 203. Omar Abdel-Jawad Abdel-Aziz (Professionals / al-Wafd)
8. 204. Khaled Hifni Abdullah Ali (Workers/ Revolution Continues)

===== Second District (Baba) =====
1. 205. Saad Aboud Abdel Wahid Qutb (Professionals / al-Karama)
2. 206. Farouk Abdel Hafiz Abdel Atti Mabrouk (Workers/ Freedom and Justice)
3. 207. Mohamed Qurni Abdel Wahab, (Workers/ Egyptian Social Democrat)
4. 208. Abdel Tawab Mohamed Mohamed Uthman (Professionals / al-Nour)

==== Sohag (20 seats) ====
===== First District (Sohag) =====
1. 209. Mohamed Saghir Abdul Rahim (Professionals / Building and Development)
2. 210. Ali Bahi al-Din al-Ansari (Workers / al-Nour)
3. 211. Abdul Nasser Hasan Mohamed (Workers / al-Nour)
4. 212. Rifaat Mohamed Sulieman (Farmers / al-Nour)
5. 213. Mohamed al-‘Atia Sagheer Hussein (Professionals / Freedom and Justice)
6. 214. Mohamed Yusuf Mahmoud Shatta (Workers / Freedom and Justice)
7. 215. Mukhtar Ahmed Mohamed Ahmed al-Sayed (Professionals / Freedom and Justice)
8. 216. Hussein Abdul Rahman Ibrahim Abu Duma (Farmers / Egyptian Social Democrat)
9. 217. Salah al-Din Mohamed Hussein al-‘Ajaji (Farmers / Egyptian Social Democrat)
10. 218. Ahmed Haridey Mahmoud Mohamed (Farmers / al-Wafd)
11. 219. Mohamed Hamid Ahmed al-Sabaq (Professionals / al-Wasat)
12. 220. Ahmed Mohamed Nasha’at Mansour (Professionals / Egypt National)

===== Second District (Garga) =====
1. 221. Mohamed Mostafa Abdul Majid al-Ansari (Workers / Freedom and Justice)
2. 222. Ali al-Shadhili Badawi al-Sayed (Workers / Freedom and Justice)
3. 223. Mahmoud Hamdi Ahmed (Professionals / al-Nour)
4. 224. Ashraf Ahmed ‘Ajour Hasan (Farmers / al-Nour)
5. 225. Mohamed Abdul Rahman Hilali (Professionals / Free Egyptians )
6. 226. Ahmed Ahmed Ismail Abu Kreishi (Professionals / al-Wafd)
7. 227. Rafat Sayfeen Haleem Khalil (Farmers / Reform and Development)
8. 228. Abdul Fattah Ali Qasim Hasan (Farmers / Egyptian Citizen)

==== Aswan (4 seats) ====
1. 229. Shahat Abdullah Omar Ahmed (Farmers / Freedom and Justice)
2. 230. Mohamed Mahmoud Hasanain Saleh (Farmers / al-Nour)
3. 231. Mohamed al-Mirghani Abdullah Dawud (Professionals / al-Wafd)
4. 232. Hilal Ahmed al-Dandrawi Mohamed (Workers / al-Tagammu)

==== Daqahliya (24 seats) ====
===== First District (Al-Mansoura) =====
1. 233. Tareq al-Desouki Abdul Khalil Ali (Professionals / Freedom and Justice)
2. 234. Seham Abdul Lateef Mohamed al-Yamani al-Jamal (Farmers / Freedom and Justice)
3. 235. Ibrahim Faraj al-Qasabi Faraj (Farmers / Freedom and Justice)
4. 236. Ibrahim Mohamed Ahmed Abdul Rahman (Professionals / al-Nour)
5. 237. Hussein Abdul Jawad Abdul Mu’ti (Farmers / al-Nour)
6. 238. Mohamed Fo’ad Mushin Abdul Aziz Badrawi (Professionals / al-Wafd)
7. 239. Mohamed Shabani Mohamed Talba (Professionals / Revolution Continues)
8. 240. Hatem Hosni Mohamed Abdul Ghani (Workers / Democratic Peace)

===== Second District (Dakrnis) =====
1. 241. Mohamed Mohamed Abdul Ghani Faraj (Professionals / Freedom and Justice)
2. 242. Al-Sadat Abdul Rahim Abdul Salam (Workers / Freedom and Justice)
3. 243. Adel Abbas Mohamed al-Qala (Professionals / Freedom and Justice)
4. 244. Rizq Mohamed Mohamed Ali Ahmed (Farmers / al-Nour)
5. 245. Mohamed Mohamed Hasan Issa (Professionals / al-Nour)
6. 246. Mohamed Hamdi Abul Gheit Mustajir al-Jamal (Workers / Revolution Continues)
7. 247. Ibrahim Mohamed Mohamed ‘Amasha (Professionals / al-Wafd)
8. 248. Majdi Mohamed ‘Ala Kharibi (Workers / Revolution Continues)

===== Third District (Meet Ghamar) =====
1. 249. Mohamed Abdul ‘Aal Abbas Haykal (Professionals / Freedom and Justice)
2. 250. Shafiq Mohamed Abdul Hayy Ibrahim al-Deeb (Workers / Freedom and Justice)
3. 251. Mohamed Rajab Ismail ‘Awf (Professionals / Freedom and Justice)
4. 252. Mostafa al-Sa’id al-Sawi Mutawa’i (Professionals / al-Nour)
5. 253. Shareef Taha Hussein ‘Abdul Fadeel (Farmers / al-Nour)
6. 254. Mostafa Abdul Aziz Ahmed al-Jindi (Professionals / Revolution Continues)
7. 255. Badwi Abdul Latif Hilal Badwi (Farmers / al-Wafd)
8. 256. Al-Sayed Shahata Mohamed Khalifah (Democratic Peace)

==== Al-Gharbiya (20 Seats) ====
===== First District (Tanta) =====
1. 257. Sayid Ahmed Yusuf Al-Sayed al-Shuri (Workers/ Freedom and Justice)
2. 258. Mohamed Mundah Mohamed al-Azbawi (Professionals / Freedom and Justice)
3. 259. Hamdi Abd al-Wahhab Ahmed Ramadan (Workers/ Freedom and Justice)
4. 260. Hani Adl Ahmed Saqr (Professionals / al-Nour)
5. 261. Mufrah Mohamed al-Shadhili (Professionals / al-Nour)
6. 262. Al-Sayed Mohamedi Al-Ajwani (Professionals / al-Nour)
7. 263. Mustafa Abdel-Raouf Newehy (Professionals / al-Wafd)
8. 264. Hussein Mahmoud Khalil (Farmers / al-Wafd)
9. 265. Hamada Ahmed Ibrahim Iqst (Professionals / Free Egyptians Party)
10. 266. Ashraf Talaat Mohamed al-Shabrawy (Farmers / Reform and Development)

===== Second District (Al-Mahalla) =====
1. 267. Saad Esmat Mohamed al-Husseini (Professionals / Freedom and Justice)
2. 268. Mohamed Mustafa Adli Abdul Wahid (Workers / Freedom and Justice)
3. 269. Alaa al-Din Mohamed Ahmed Azab al-Qut (Professionals / Freedom and Justice)
4. 270. Najah Saad Al-Mahrous Thabit (Workers / Freedom and Justice)
5. 271. Abdel Wahab Mohamed Zaki Faraj Al-Badri (Professionals / al-Nour)
6. 272. Ahmed Ahmed Abdel al-Mu’ti Bialy (Farmers / al-Nour)
7. 273. Ahmed Zaki Ahmed Qattan (Professionals / al-Nour)
8. 274. Ahmed Mahmoud Ahmed Atallah (Professionals / al-Wafd)
9. 275. Nabil Tawfiq Al-Sayed Matlu’ (Farmers / al-Wafd)
10. 276. Atef Abdel Hay Abdel-Rahman Shakhba (Farmers / Free Egyptians)

==== Qaliubiya (12 Seats) ====
===== First District (Banha) =====
1. 277. Mohamed Emad al-Din Abdel-Hamid Sabir (Professionals / Freedom and Justice)
2. 278. Mohamed Abdel Majid Ibrahim Desouki (Farmers / Freedom and Justice)
3. 279. Nader Abdul-Khaliq Abd al-Hamid Afifi (Professionals / al-Nour)
4. 280. Al-Sayed Fouad Ahmed Kush (Workers / al-Wafd)

===== Second District (Shubra) =====
1. 281. Mohamed Mohamed Ibrahim Beltagy (Professionals / Freedom and Justice)
2. 282. Abdullah Ahmed Mohamed Khalil (Workers / Freedom and Justice)
3. 283. Huda Mohamed Anwar al-Abdul Rahman Al-Ghaniyeh (Professionals / Freedom and Justice)
4. 284. Hassan Al-Sayed Mohamed Abu al-Azm Sayed (Professionals / al-Nour)
5. 285. Mohamed Hassan Abdel-Salam Hassan (Workers / al-Nour)
6. 286. Najib Lutfi Najib Farid (Workers / Reform and Development)
7. 287. Mohamed Abdul Alim Abdul Aziz Salim (Workers / al-Wafd)
8. 288. Fathi Desouki Syed Ali (Workers / Egyptian Social Democrat)

==== Minya (16 Seats) ====
===== First District (Minya) =====
1. 289. Mohamed Saad Tawfik Al Katatni (Professionals / Freedom and Justice)
2. 290. Mohamed Abdel Azim Mohamed Ahmed (Workers / Freedom and Justice)
3. 291. Mohamed Hassan Aref Metwally (Professionals / Freedom and Justice)
4. 292. Mustafa Abdul-Khaliq Mehdi Sayed (Workers / Freedom and Justice)
5. 293. Amr Magdi Makram Abdel Latif (Professionals / Building and Development)
6. 294. Saleh Abdel-Azim Abdel-Fattah (Workers / al-Nour)
7. 295. Ihab Adel Ramzi Hanna (Professionals / Freedom Party)
8. 296. Mustafa Morsi Osman Seif al-Nasr (Farmers / al-Wasat)

===== Second District (Wasat Minya) =====
1. 297. Hussein Sultan Mohamed Nassar (Professionals / Freedom and Justice)
2. 298. Bahaa Eddin Sayed Attia Suleiman (Workers / Freedom and Justice)
3. 299. Mohamed Abu Bakr Mohamed Hassan (Professionals / Freedom and Justice)
4. 300. Mohamed Khalifa Hussein Omar (Professionals / Egyptian Social Democrat)
5. 301. Ashraf Sayed Mohamed Shawky (Farmers / Egyptian Social Democrat)
6. 302. Mohamed Ahmed Mohamedein al-Munshid (Farmers / al-Nour)
7. 303. Mohamed Talaat Mohamed Osman (Professionals / al-Nour)
8. 304. Mohamed Abdel-Hafiz Mohamed Abdul Hafeez (Farmers / al-Wafd)

==== Marsa Matruh (4 seats) ====
1. 305. Faraj Ali Abdullah al-Hamid Abd al-Mawla (Professionals / al-Nour)
2. 306. Khayr Allah Abdul Aziz Hussein Marda (Farmers / al-Nour)
3. 307. Sa’ad Jab Allah Abu Yusuf Masud (Professionals / al-Nour)
4. 308. Bilal Jibril Abdullah (Workers / Freedom and Justice)

==== Qena (12 Seats) ====
===== First District (Qena) =====
1. 309. Mahmoud Yusuf Mahmoud Abdul-Rahim (Professionals / Freedom and Justice)
2. 310. Mu’taz Mohamed Mahmoud Ali Hussein (Professionals / Freedom Party)
3. 311. Hassan Bakri Ahmed Bakri (Farmers / al-Nour)
4. 312. Jamal Mohamed Ahmed Ammar Awad (Farmers / al-Wafd)

===== Second District (Naja’ Hamadi) =====
1. 313. Abdul Nasser Tughyan Abd al-Aal Mahmoud (Professionals / Freedom and Justice)
2. 314. Yunus Sabir Hussein Ali (Workers / Freedom and Justice)
3. 315. Abd al-Karim Mohamed Ahmed Ibrahim (Professionals / al-Nour)
4. 316. Mohamed Jab Allah Abdulaziz Mohamed (Farmers / al-Nour)
5. 317. Hussein Fayiz Abdul ‘Ala al-Shadhili (Professionals / Union)
6. 318. Abdul Nabi Mohamed Abdul Nabi Salman (Professionals / Union)
7. 319. Ahmed Mukhtar Othman Mohamed (Workers / al-Wafd)
8. 320. Ahmed Mohamed Hussein Mohamed (Farmers / Egyptian Social Democrat)

==== New Valley (4 Seats) ====
1. 321. Sameh Sa’dawi Mohamed Ali (Professionals / Freedom and Justice)
2. 322. Salah Mohamed Hafez Mohamed Adam (Professionals / al-Nour)
3. 323. Kamal Mohamed Mahmoud Abdul Jawad (Workers / al-Nour)
4. 324. Bardis Seif al-Din ‘Amran Mubarak (Workers / Nasserite Party)

==== North Sinai (4 Seats) ====
1. 325. Sulieman Salim Saleh Salem (Professionals / Freedom and Justice)
2. 326. Khaled Mohamed Muslim Ali Salma (Workers / Freedom and Justice)
3. 327. Muhsin Abdul Aziz Hussein (Professionals / al-Nour)
4. 328. Salama Salim Salman Salim (Workers / Reform and Development)

==== South Sinai (4 Seats) ====
1. 329. Abdullah Ibrahim al-Desouki Abd Rabbu (Professionals / Freedom and Justice)
2. 330. Ahmed Ibrahim Qassim Metwali (Workers / Freedom and Justice)
3. 331. Fadiya Salim Obeidallah Salim (Professionals / Reform and Development)
4. 332. Ahmed Ramadan Abdul Ghaffar Wahdan (Workers / al-Wafd)

=== Individual Member District Seats (166) ===
==== Cairo (18 seats) ====
1. 1. Fahmy Abdou Mustafa (Professionals / Freedom and Justice)
2. 2. Kamal Hassan Mahdi (Workers / Freedom and Justice)
3. 3. Amr Mohamed Zaky (Professionals / Freedom and Justice)
4. 4. Yasser Ibrahim Abdullah (Workers / Freedom and Justice)
5. 5. Mustafa Ahmed Al-Naggar (Professionals / al-Adl)
6. 6. Amr Farouk Awda (Workers / Independent)
7. 7. Amr Nabil Ahmed Hamzawy (Professionals / Independent)
8. 8. Hisham Suleiman Musa (Workers / Independent)
9. 9. Sayed Hussein Mohamed Gadalla (Professionals / Freedom and Justice)
10. 10. Ashraf Saad Abdul-Latif (Workers / Freedom and Justice)
11. 11. Mohamed Abu Hamed Shedid (Professionals / Free Egyptians Party)
12. 12. Mustafa Farghali Rashwan (Workers / Freedom and Justice)
13. 13. Khalid Mohamed Ahmed Mohamed (Professionals / Freedom and Justice)
14. 14. Nasser Eddin Ibrahim Osman (Workers / Freedom and Justice)
15. 15. Khaled Hanafi Faheem Hussain (Professionals / Freedom and Justice)
16. 16. Yousry Mohamed Bayoumi (Workers / Freedom and Justice)
17. 17. Mohamed Mustafa Bakri Mohamed (Professionals / Independent)
18. 18. Ramadan Ahmed Omar Salem (Workers / Freedom and Justice)

==== Alexandria (8 seats) ====
1. 19. Hosni Mohamed Taha Dowidar (Professionals / Independent)
2. 20. Mustafa Mohamed Mustafa (Workers / Freedom and Justice)
3. 21. Mahmoud Reda Abdel Aziz al-Khudairi (Professionals / Independent)
4. 22. Al-Mohamedi al-Sayed Ahmed Abu al-Hamd (Workers / Freedom and Justice)
5. 23. Mahmoud Atiyya Mabrouk (Professionals / Freedom and Justice)
6. 24. Saber Abu al-Fotouh Badawi al-Sayed (Workers / Freedom and Justice)
7. 25. Essam Mohamed Hassanein (Professionals / al-Nour)
8. 26. Essam Mahmoud Rajab (Workers / Independent)

==== Kafr Al-Sheikh (6 seats) ====
1. 27. Mohamed Ibrahim Abdel-Hamid Mansour (Professionals / al-Nour)
2. 28. Mohamed Abdel-Majid Abu She’sha (Farmers / al-Nour)
3. 29. Mohamed Ibrahim Darwish Amer (Professionals / Freedom and Justice)
4. 30. Ashraf Mohamed Al-Saeed Yusuf (Workers / Freedom and Justice)
5. 31. Yusuf Al-Badri Abdel-Fattah (Professionals / Egypt National)
6. 32. Mohamed Abdel-Alim Dawoud (Workers / al-Wafd)

==== Damietta (4 seats) ====
1. 33. Ali Hasan Hasan Al-Day (Professionals / Freedom and Justice)
2. 34. Mohamed Al-Sayed Ahmed Abu Musa (Workers / Freedom and Justice)
3. 35. Mohamed Mohamed Al-Filahjy (Professionals / Freedom and Justice)
4. 36. Imran Mohamed Mujahid (Workers / Independent)

==== Port Said (2 seats) ====
1. 37. Akram Al-Mendoh Awad Al-Shaer (Professionals / Freedom and Justice)
2. 38. Al-Badri Farghali Ali (Workers / Independent)

==== Al-Fayoum (6 seats) ====
1. 39. Adel Ismail Abdel-Hamid Musa (Professionals / Freedom and Justice)
2. 40. Hamdi Taha Abdul Rahim Al-Issa (Farmers / Freedom and Justice)
3. 41. Osama Yahya Abd Al-Wahid Yahya (Professionals / Freedom and Justice)
4. 42. Sayed Abdel-Karim Jabr Nasr (Farmers / Freedom and Justice)
5. 43. Jamal Hassan Abdel Latif (Professionals / Freedom and Justice)
6. 44. Fawzi Ali Abdul Aziz (Farmers / Freedom and Justice)

==== Assiut (8 seats) ====
1. 45. Samir Othman Ibrahim Khashaba (Professionals / Freedom and Justice)
2. 46. Bayoumi Ismail Abdel-Jaber (Workers / Building and Development)
3. 47. Mohamed Salama Bakr (Professionals / Freedom and Justice)
4. 48. Mohamed Modir Moussa (Workers / Freedom and Justice)
5. 49. Abdul Aziz Khalaf Mohamed Ali (Professionals / Freedom and Justice)
6. 50. Abdullah Sadek Noshi Ahmed (Workers / Freedom and Justice)
7. 51. Hassan Ali Abd Al-Al Amer (Professionals / Freedom and Justice)
8. 52. Amer Abdel Rahim Mahmoud Ali (Farmers / Building and Development)

==== Luxor (2 seats) ====
1. 53. Abdul Mawjod Rajeh Dardiri (Professionals / Freedom and Justice)
2. 54. Khaled Abdel Moneim Farag (Farmers / Freedom Party)

==== Red Sea (2 seats) ====
1. 55. Mohamed Mahmoud Yusuf Katamesh (Professionals / Freedom and Justice)
2. 56. Abdel Al-Baset Sayyid Mubarak (Workers / Egyptian Citizen)

==== Beheira (10 seats) ====
1. 57. Osama Mohamed Ibrahim Soliman (Professionals / Freedom and Justice)
2. 58. Tareq Rajab Saleh Mohamed Saleh (Workers / Freedom and Justice)
3. 59. Mahmoud Abdullah Ibrahim Mabrouk Haiba (Professionals / al-Nour)
4. 60. Yasser Ali Abdul Rafi Ali (Farmers / Freedom and Justice)
5. 61. Ahmed Zuhair Mohamed Said (Professionals / Freedom and Justice)
6. 62. Masry Saad Masry Mohareb (Farmers / Freedom and Justice)
7. 63. Abdullah Mohamed Mohamed Saad (Professionals / al-Nour)
8. 64. Hamid Abdellah Khalil Al-Tuhan (Farmers / Al-Nour)
9. 65. Saad Mahmoud Mohamed Abu Talib (Professionals / Freedom and Justice)
10. 66. Ahmed Al-Sayed Yusuf Khater (Workers / Independent)

==== Al-Sharqiya (10 seats) ====
1. 67. Al-Sayed Abdul Aziz Ismail Negeida (Professionals / Freedom and Justice)
2. 68. Saleh Ali Ahmed Suleiman (Workers / Freedom and Justice)
3. 69. Amir Mohamed Bassam Al-Najjar (Professionals / Freedom and Justice)
4. 70. Mohamed Mohamed Abdul Rauf Ismail (Workers / Freedom and Justice)
5. 71. Mohamed Fayyad Abdel Moneim Fayyad (Professionals / Freedom and Justice)
6. 72. Ibrahim Mohamed Mohamed Salim (Farmers / Freedom and Justice)
7. 73. Mohamed Safwat Al-Hadi Sweilem (Professionals / Freedom and Justice)
8. 74. Mohamed Awad Mohamed Shawish (Workers / Freedom and Justice)
9. 75. Ahmed Suleiman Ahmed Ibrahim (Professionals / Freedom and Justice)
10. 76. Al-Sayed Mohamed Abdul Karim Al-Atawil (Workers / Freedom and Justice)

==== Al-Menoufia (8 seats) ====
1. 77. Helmy Al-Sayed Mohamed Bakr (Professionals / Independent)
2. 78. Saad Mohamed Yousuf Hussein (Workers / Freedom and Justice)
3. 79. Mohamed Anwar Esmat Sadat (Farmers / Reform and Development)
4. 80. Said Al-Azb Abdul Qader Eid (Workers / Freedom and Justice)
5. 81. Nasr Ali Ahmed Tahoun (Professionals / Independent)
6. 82. Mahmoud Ali Mohamed Abul Magd (Workers / Freedom and Justice)
7. 83. Ibrahim Ibrahim Mustafa Hajjaj (Professionals / Freedom and Justice)
8. 84. Anwar Saeed Anwar Al-Bulkimy (Workers / al-Nour)

==== Giza (10 seats) ====
1. 85. Mohamed Ibrahim Ahmed Hussein (Professionals / Freedom and Justice)
2. 86. Khattab Sayed Khattab Murad (Workers / Freedom and Justice)
3. 87. Gamal Abdel Fattah Ali Ashri (Professionals / Freedom and Justice)
4. 88. Hassan Boraik Khalifa Boraik (Workers / Freedom and Justice)
5. 89. Mohamed Amr Mahmoud Al-Shobki (Professionals / Independent affiliated with al-Adl)
6. 90. Ayman Mahmoud Sadek Refaat (Workers / Freedom and Justice)
7. 91. Mohamed Abdel-Moneim Mahmoud Al-Sawy (Professionals / al-Hadara)
8. 92. Abdul Salam Zaki Mohamed Bashandi (Workers / Freedom and Justice)
9. 93. Mahmoud Mohamed Ali Amer (Professionals / Freedom and Justice)
10. 94. Mustafa Mohamed Ibrahim Salman (Farmers / Independent)

==== Beni Suef (6 seats) ====
1. 95. Jaber Mansour Abdel Wahab Yassin (Professionals / Freedom and Justice)
2. 96. Najm al-Din Aziz Fadel Salim (Workers / al-Nour)
3. 97. Mohamed Shakir Abdul Baqi Miahub (Professionals / Freedom and Justice)
4. 98. Abdul Hakim Mohamed Mohamed Masoud (Farmers / al-Nour)
5. 99. Nihad al-Qasim Sayed Abdul Wahab Khudair (Professionals / Freedom and Justice)
6. 100. Abd al-Qader Abdul-Wahab Abdul Qader Ismail (Workers / Freedom and Justice)

==== Sohag (10 seats) ====
1. 101. Walid Abdul Awal Mahmoud Ibrahim (Professionals / al-Nour)
2. 102. Mustafa Abdul-Hamid Ali Abd al-Rahim (Farmers / Freedom and Justice)
3. 103. Mohamed Mohamed Abdul Rahman Al Sayed (Professionals / Freedom and Justice)
4. 104. Adlan Mahmoud Ahmed Morsi (Farmers / Building and Development)
5. 105. Mohamed Masaad Imam Al-Harzjy (Professionals / Freedom and Justice)
6. 106. Lahdha Ahmed Najdi Hasan (Farmers / Building and Development)
7. 107. Jabir Abdul Moneim Ali Mohamed (Professionals / Building and Development)
8. 108. Faisal Mohamed Ali Hassan (Farmers / Independent)
9. 109. Rafat Mohamed Mahmoud Ahmed (Professionals / Independent)
10. 110. Yusuf Hassan Yusuf Ahmed (Farmers / Independent)

==== Ismailia (2 seats) ====
1. 111. Mohamed Hisham Mustafa Al-Suli (Professionals / Freedom and Justice)
2. 112. Mohamed Abdullah Ali Hawari (Farmers / al-Nour)

==== Suez (2 seats) ====
1. 113. Abbas Abdel Aziz Abbas Mohamed (Professionals / Freedom and Justice)
2. 114. Hani Nur al-Din Abu Bakr (Workers / Building and Development)

==== Aswan (2 seats) ====
1. 115. Mohamed Mahmoud Ali Hamid (Professionals / Independent)
2. 116. Faraj Allah Gadalla Ahmed Mohamed (Workers / Building and Development)

==== Al-Gharbiya (10 seats) ====
1. 117. Mohamed Abdel-Hamid Ahmed Feki (Professionals / al-Wafd)
2. 118. Sayed Abdel-Maksoud ‘Askar (Workers / Freedom and Justice)
3. 119. Ali Abdel Fattah Ali Najm (Professionals / al-Nour)
4. 120. Mahmoud Ismail Muhduyeh (Farmers / Freedom and Justice)
5. 121. Hamdi al-Dessouki Mohamed al-Fakhrani (Professionals / Independent)
6. 122. Mahmoud Tawfiq Mohamed Abdel Aal (Workers / Freedom and Justice)
7. 123. Sameh Abdel Hamid Shawki Ibrahim (Professionals / Freedom and Justice)
8. 124. Abdul-Aziz Yahya Abdul-Aziz (Workers / Freedom and Justice)
9. 125. Ibrahim Zakaria Ibrahim Younis (Professionals / Freedom and Justice)
10. 126. Mohamed Maher Sayed Shehata (Farmers / Independent)

==== Daqahliya (12 seats) ====
1. 127. Yusr Mohamed Han’i (Professionals / Freedom and Justice)
2. 128. Tariq Mohamed Qutb (Workers / Freedom and Justice)
3. 129. Ali Ibrahim Ali Qatamesh (Professionals / al-Nour)
4. 130. Saad Ali Abdu Halwaji (Workers / Freedom and Justice)
5. 131. Imad Shams al-Din Mohamed Abdel-Rahman (Professionals / Freedom and Justice)
6. 132. Abdul Hamid Mohamed Hassan Issa (Workers / Freedom and Justice)
7. 133. Ibrahim Ibrahim Abu Awf Yusuf (Professionals / Freedom and Justice)
8. 134. Khalid Mustafa Kamel (Workers / Independent)
9. 135. Khalid Mohamed Metwally al-Deeb (Professionals / Freedom and Justice)
10. 136. Tahir Ahmed Al-Saeed Atta (Farmers / Independent)
11. 137. Al-Sayed Mohamed Niazi al-‘Adawi (Professionals / Freedom and Justice)
12. 138. Osama Mohamed Abdel Ati Metwally (Farmers / Independent)

==== Qaliubiya (6 seats) ====
1. 139. Mohsen Radi (Professionals / Freedom and Justice)
2. 140. Ali Wanis (Workers / al-Nour)
3. 141. Nasser al-Hafi (Professionals / Freedom and Justice)
4. 142. Jamal Shehata (Workers / Freedom and Justice)
5. 143. Ahmed Mohamed Mahmoud Diab (Professionals / Freedom and Justice)
6. 144. Sayed Imam Mahmoud al-Qadi (Workers / Freedom and Justice)

==== Minya (8 seats) ====
1. 145. Ali Ahmed Mohamed Omran (Professionals / Freedom and Justice)
2. 146. Gom’a Yusuf Ahmed Kafafi (Workers / Freedom and Justice)
3. 147. Mohamed Abdullah Hassan al-Basil (Professionals / Freedom and Justice)
4. 148. Hamdi Khalifah Mohamed Abdul Nabi (Workers / Freedom and Justice)
5. 149. Musharraf Ahmed Mohamed Musharraf (Professionals / al-Nour)
6. 150. Ahmed Hassan Sayed Abboud (Workers / al-Nour)
7. 151. Medhat Abdel Jaber Ali Yusuf (Professionals / al-Nour)
8. 152. Ahmed Yusuf Tony Abu al-Khair (Farmers / Building and Development)

==== Qena (6 seats) ====
1. 153. Ahmed Sayed Mohamed al-Saghir (Professionals / Freedom and Justice)
2. 154. Adel Mohamed Obaid Ahmed (Farmers / Building and Development)
3. 155. Mohamed Yunus Mohamed Ali (Professionals / Independent)
4. 156. Hisham Ahmed Hanfi Abdullah (Farmers / Freedom and Justice)
5. 157. Ali Ibrahim Ahmed al-Shishani (Professionals / Freedom and Justice)
6. 158. Abdul Nasser Sayed Mohamed Abdel-Halim (Workers / Building and Development)

==== Marsa Matrouh (2 seats) ====
1. 159. Mansour Deef (Professionals / al-Nour)
2. 160. Mansour al-‘Aqari Qawiya (Farmers / al-Nour)

==== New Valley (2 seats) ====
1. 161. Mohamed Abdel Majid Hamid (Professionals / Freedom and Justice)
2. 162. Aladdin Abdul Latif Ismail (Workers / al-Nour)

==== North Sinai (2 seats) ====
1. 163. Abd al-Rahman Said Abdel-Rahman Dawud (Professionals / Freedom and Justice)
2. 164. Ali Mohamed Salman (Workers / Independent)

==== South Sinai (2 seats) ====
1. 165. Mohamed Farag Salem Moussa (Professionals / al-Nour)
2. 166. Gharib Ahmed Hassan Ali (Workers / Independent)

=== SCAF-Appointed Seats (10) ===
1. 1. Susie Adly Nashed
2. 2. Marianne Malak Kamal
3. 3. Hanna Gerges Grayss
4. 4. George Nagy Messiah
5. 5. Tarek Makram Shaker
6. 6. Abdullah Mohammed al-Maghazi
7. 7. Yasser Salah Abdel Aziz Abdel Maguid
8. 8. Abdullah Salim Jahama
9. 9. Sherif Mohamed Abdel Hameed Zahran
10. 10. Omar Saber Abdel Galil
