= 2011–12 Egyptian parliamentary election =

- 28 November 2011 – 11 January 2012

498 of 508 seats in the People's Assembly 255 seats needed for a majority
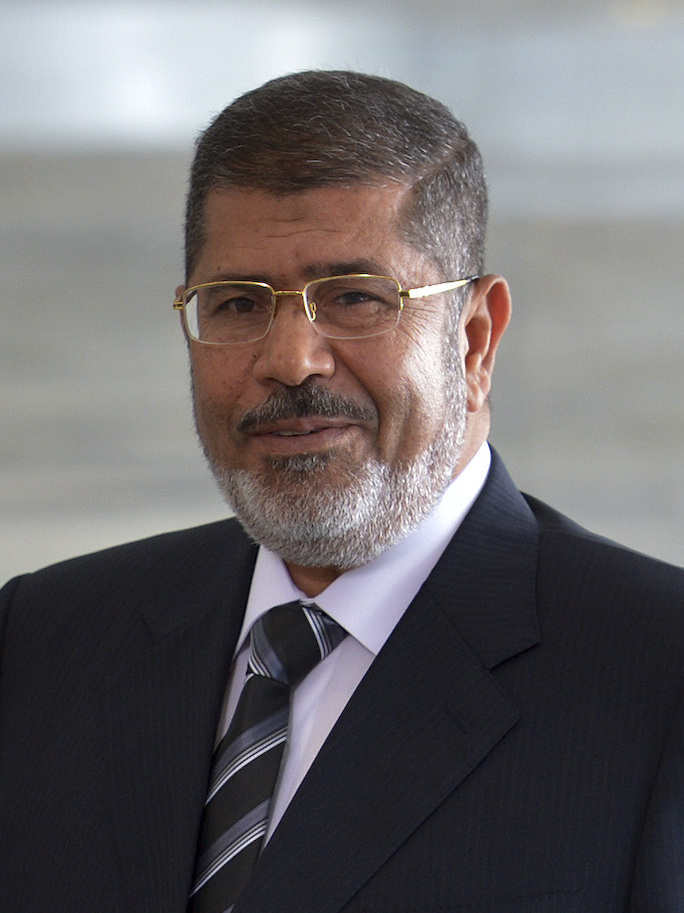

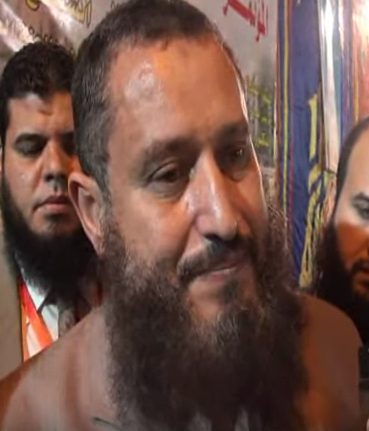

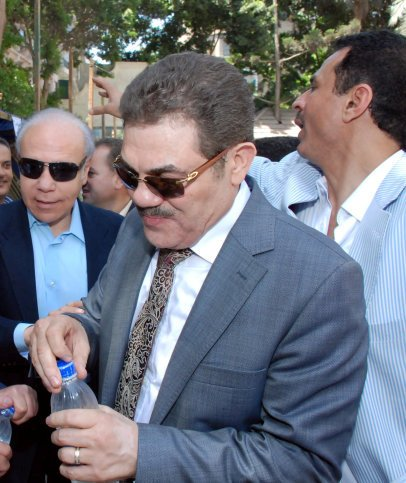

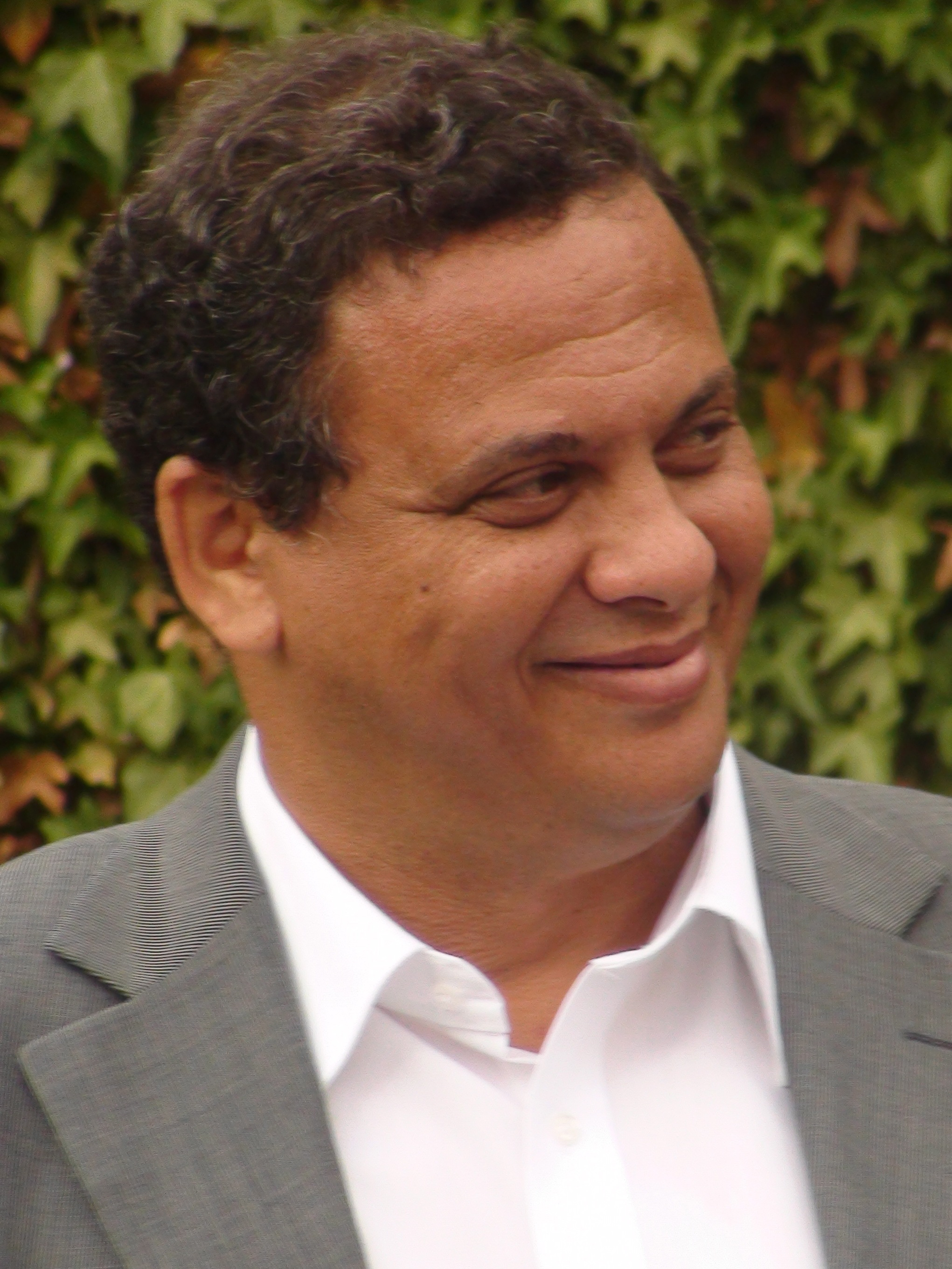
	First party	Second party
Leader	Mohamed Morsi	Emad Abdel Ghaffour
Party	Freedom and Justice	Al-Nour
Alliance	Democratic Alliance	Islamist Bloc
Seats won	235 (incl. 22 allies)	123 (incl. 16 allies)
Popular vote	10,138,134	7,534,266
Percentage	37.5%	27.8%
	Third party	Fourth party
Leader	El-Sayyid el-Badawi	Ahmed Hassan Said
Party	New Wafd	Egyptian Bloc
Seats won	38	35
Popular vote	2,480,391	2,402,238
Percentage	9.2%	8.9%
Speaker before election
SCAF
Elected Speaker
Saad El-Katatny
Freedom and Justice

Parliamentary elections were held in Egypt from 28 November 2011 to 11 January 2012, following the revolution that ousted President Hosni Mubarak, after which the Supreme Council of the Armed Forces (SCAF) dissolved Parliament. However the dissolution was ruled unconstitutional and Parliament was reinstated. Originally, the elections had been scheduled to be held in September 2011, but were postponed amid concerns that established parties would gain undue advantage.

The elections were proclaimed the first honest national elections of any sort held in Egypt since the overthrow of the monarchy in 1952. However, there were also complaints of irregularities and fraud. The main focus of the newly elected Parliament was to be the selection of the members of a Constituent Assembly.

== Background ==
In late 2010, a parliamentary election was held, though it was followed by controversy and repression as well as accusations of fraud.

Following similar events in Tunisia during the Arab Spring, Egyptian activists called for protesters to turn up in cities around Egypt on specific days. Though violence was reported at some points, protests were largely peaceful with the army staying quiet until 10 February 2011, when calls for Hosni Mubarak to resign were at their peak. The following day, Vice President Omar Suleiman announced Mubarak's resignation from the presidency while turning power over to the military. The Supreme Council of the Armed Forces, headed by Field Marshal Mohamed Hussein Tantawi, would lead the country for a transitional period until a civilian government took over.

A constitutional referendum was then approved on 19 March that would ease the process of electing a president.

== New electoral law ==
The election was conducted under a parallel voting system. Two-thirds of seats were elected by party-list proportional representation. The remaining one-third were elected under a form of bloc voting in two-seat constituencies.

=== Choosing the system ===
Prior to the elections there were concerns that a change to the electoral system would be required, as the pre-existing system would have favoured the National Democratic Party, the party of Mubarak loyalists. The National Democratic Party was dissolved in April, however.

The proposed draft law for the electoral system to be used was revealed on 30 May 2011; controversially, it retained bloc voting for two-thirds of the seats, with only one third of the seats elected by proportional representation (However, later it was changed as to two-thirds, 332 of MPs to be elected proportionally from lists).

On 7 July 2011, the caretaker government approved the new electoral law. It outlined a new 50–50 division between proportional seats and constituency seats; the minimum age limit for candidates is also to be reduced from 30 to 25.

On 21 July 2011, the SCAF announced:

- that the election (for both the People's Assembly and the Shura Council) would be held in three rounds in October, with 15-day intervals in-between;
- that half the seats would be reserved for laborers and farmers;
- that the women's quota introduced under Mubarak would be abolished.

In late September 2011, again new division was announced, in which only one third of the seats would be elected by bloc voting in two-seat constituencies. However, constituency MPs could only be independents and not members of political parties; this restriction led to threats of boycotting the election by a wide swath of the political parties which intended to contest the election. The parties stated that their demands for a change in the electoral law would have to be met by 2 October, else they would boycott the election. After a meeting with political party leaders on 1 October 2011, the SCAF agreed to allow party members to run for the directly elected seats, set a clearer timetable for the transition to civilian rule and possibly abolish military trials for civilians.

On 11 November 2011, an administrative court in Mansoura ruled that former NDP members were not allowed to stand in the election as independent candidates. It was not immediately known whether this ruling would eventually apply to the whole country. On 14 November 2011, the Higher Administrative Court in Cairo overruled the decision and allowed the former NDP members to stand.

=== Voting process ===
The election to the People's Assembly took place on the following dates:

- first stage: 28–29 November, run-off on 5–6 December;
- second stage: 14–15 December, run-off on 21–22 December;
- third stage: 3–4 January, run-off on 10–11 January.

There are a total 508 seats in the Lower house: 498 seats are elected, and 10 seats appointed, in this case, by the Military Council, and usually by the President.

Under the parallel voting system used, out of 498 total seats, two-thirds, meaning 332, were elected by means of party list proportional representation. For these seats the public voted for parties or coalition-lists and the result was determined by the largest remainder method with a 0.5 percent threshold, in 46 districts.

The remaining 166 seats were elected by bloc voting in two-seat constituencies, with the possibility of a run off. In the election voters each cast two votes, which could not be for the same individual. These seats were open to candidates running as individuals, who might not be affiliated to political parties, numbering two per each of the 83 districts. Out of these, the new parliament must have at least half "laborers" or "farmers", while the "professionals" should constitute at most half of the parliament. If the winner of one of the two seats that are allocated to a certain district, is a "professional", the second seat in the district shall be handed to a "laborer" or a "farmer". Run-offs are assigned to the individual candidates who did not receive over 50% of the votes in the first round. For a detailed explanation, see.

Additional requirements for parties include listing at least one woman and adopting a specific visual symbol, as an alternative detection to help the illiterate voters. The same voting procedures shall apply to the upper house's election, too.

The election for the upper house, the Shura Council ("the Consultative Council") are to follow on 29 January 2012, and will take place in 3 stages as well between 29 January and 22 February. (process was sped due to ongoing protests). Out of a total 270 seats in the Upper House: 180 seats are up for grabs and 90 seats shall be appointed after the presidential election, by the president-elect. Following these elections, the parliament shall select a committee that will draft a new constitution for Egypt. The new constitution shall than be submitted to a referendum. Only then will presidential election be held, "no later than 30 June 2012" according to Hussein Tantawi's statement.

2011–2012 election stages: First: 28–29 November, run-off on 5–6 December Second: 14–15 December, run-off on 21–22 December Third: 3–4 January, run-off on 10–11 January

Governorate	PR (parties / coalition-lists)		FPTP (Individuals)		Total Seats
Governorate	# of Districts	# of Seats	# of Districts	# of Seats	Total Seats
Alexandria	2	16	4	8	24
Aswan	1	4	1	2	6
Asyut	2	16	4	8	24
Beheira	2	20	5	10	30
Beni Suef	2	12	3	6	18
Cairo	4	36	9	18	54
Dakahlia	3	24	6	12	36
Damietta	1	8	2	4	12
Faiyum	2	12	3	6	18
Gharbia	2	20	5	10	30
Giza	2	20	5	10	30
Ismailia	1	4	1	2	6
Kafr el-Sheikh	2	12	3	6	18
Luxor	1	4	1	2	6
Matruh	1	4	1	2	6
Minya	2	16	4	8	24
Monufia	2	16	4	8	24
New Valley	1	4	1	2	6
North Sinai	1	4	1	2	6
Port Said	1	4	1	2	6
Qalyubia	2	12	3	6	18
Qena	2	12	3	6	18
Red Sea	1	4	1	2	6
Sharqia	2	20	5	10	30
Sohag	2	20	5	10	30
South Sinai	1	4	1	2	6
Suez	1	4	1	2	6
Total	46	332	83	166	498

== Parties ==
The Muslim Brotherhood announced on 15 February it would form the Freedom and Justice Party (FJP) to run in the election. Together with 27 other parties representing diverse political families, the Freedom and Justice Party formed the Democratic Alliance for Egypt. After several defections and entries, the FJP-dominated coalition settled on 11 parties. The FJP fielded the overwhelming majority of the candidates, and all the Democratic Alliance for Egypt joint candidates ran under the FJP label.

As a reaction to this centre-right alliance, the different liberal democratic and centrist parties intensified cooperation. Five parties drafted a joint statement criticising the current electoral law and proposing a new one. On 16 August 15 political and social movements, some of which defected from the Democratic Alliance for Egypt, announced the Egyptian Bloc electoral alliance. It consisted of liberal, secularist, and centre-left political parties, as well as social organizations and labour unions, and also the traditional Islamic Sufi Liberation Party. Its main objective was to prevent an imminent electoral victory of the Muslim Brotherhood, and the Freedom and Justice Party. After suffering multiple defections, the remaining Egyptian Bloc parties were: the Free Egyptians Party, the Egyptian Social Democratic Party and the National Progressive Unionist Party (Tagammu).

The Socialist Popular Alliance Party and other parties defected from the Egyptian Bloc after it allowed Mubarak figures in its ranks; the Socialist Popular Alliance Party formed The Revolution Continues Alliance.

The liberal New Wafd Party announced on 13 June 2011 that it would contest the election in an alliance with the Freedom and Justice Party. The New Wafd later decided to abandon its alliance with the Islamists over discrepancies concerning the prospective constitution, and considered joining the new Egyptian Bloc liberal coalition instead. The New Wafd ended up running its own independent lists.

The Salafi Al-Nour Party withdrew from the Democratic Alliance for Egypt coalition due to disagreements with the Freedom and Justice Party over its share in the coalition's joint candidate lists. On 12 August, three Islamic Salafi parties (Nour, and two unregistered groups that later became the Authenticity Party and the Building and Development Party) announced that they would run a united candidate list. Their common list is officially called the "Alliance for Egypt", and is unofficially referred to as the "Islamist Bloc". The Al-Nour Party fielded the overwhelming majority of the candidates, and all the Alliance for Egypt joint candidates are running under the Al-Nour Party label.

The Al-Wasat Party, a moderate Islamic offshoot of the Muslim Brotherhood, was officially approved as a party on 19 February, fifteen years after its foundation. After withdrawing from the Democratic Alliance for Egypt, it formed an electoral coalition with the Renaissance Party and the Pioneer Party, both of which were founded by former members of the Muslim Brotherhood. The Al-Wasat Party fielded the overwhelming majority of the coalition candidates, all of which ran under the Al-Wasat Party label.

Some analysts voiced concerns that former members of the ruling NDP might gain a lot of influence in the newly elected parliament. Among the parties identified to have had a strong base in former NDP members were:

- the Egyptian Citizen Party, led by former NDP secretary-general Mohamed Ragab (other former NDP members include Hamdi El-Sayed, Abdel Ahad Gamal El Din and Nabil Louka Bibawi);
- Egypt Revival Party (Misr El-Nahda)/Union Party (Egypt) (Al-Etihad), led by former NDP secretary-general Hossam Badrawi; the party was officially registered under the second name on 20 September 2011;
- the Freedom Party (Horreya), led by Mamdouh Ali Hassan, son of Mohamed Mahmoud (a large number of former NDP MPs joined this party);
- the Nationalist Egypt Party, led by Anwar Sadat's nephew, the late Talaat Sadat; last chairman of the NDP

== Monitors ==
The Supreme Council of the Armed Forces announced that it would bar foreign monitors because of what it claimed was the preservation of Egyptian sovereignty. However, it would welcome foreign "Observers". Groups such as NDI, The Carter Center, the International Republican Institute and South African, Turkish, Polish and Danish groups have taken part. Alongside 300 foreign civil society representatives there are 25,000 accredited monitors and a lot more concerned citizens who have pledged to alert the organizers regarding any abuses they encounter. Additionally, a number of Egyptians have turned to citizen monitoring through social media such as Facebook, Twitter and YouTube, uploading cited violations or turnouts.

== Opinion polls ==
Conducted/ Published	Polling Organisation/ Client	Sample size	FJP	New Wafd	Nour	FEP	Justice	Wasat	ESDP	Youth	Ex-NDP	other	undecided
9–20 March 2011	IPI	615	12%	23%	–	–	–	–	–	–	10%	20%	27%
June 2011	IPI	800	12%	12%	3%	1%	1%	2%	–	–	6%	14%	49%
June 2011	Gallup	?	15%	9%	?	?	?	5%	?	?	10%	?	>60%
7 July 2011	Al Jazeera	?	46%	?	27%	?	5%	6%	?	?	?	?	?
26 July 2011	Newsweek/ Daily Beast	1,008	17%	11%	–	7%	5%	1%	?	–	7%	14%	?
August 2011	APSSC/ DEDI	2,400	31.5%	14.8%	6.0%	7.5%	2.6%	1.6%	5.2%	17.2%	0.4%	13.2%	57.1%
October 2011	APSSC/ DEDI	2,400	39.0%	20.0%	6.8%	6.0%	4.7%	1.0%	0.6%	2.0%	2.8%	17.0%	38%
November 2011	APSSC/ DEDI	2,400	35.7%	26.2%	8.9%	3.9%	5.2%	2.1%	2.0%	0.4%	5.2%	10.9%	51%

== Voter turnout ==
About 50 million people were eligible to vote out of a population in excess of 85 million – with candidates from 50 registered political parties. The overall voter turnout was 54%.

=== First phase ===
In the first phase of election, the voter turnout was 59%.

First phase, 28–29 November

Large crowds turned out at the polling stations for the first stage of the polls. Such a turnout prompted the election committee to extend the hours of polling by two hours to end at 21:00. A majority of the protesters in Tahrir square who had been at the sit-in after deadly clashes a week earlier, left their sit-in to join the polls before returning to Tahrir Square, although some boycotted the election.

Even before the government gave the official figures, the FJP's observers estimated a turnout of about 30 to 32 percent, for the first day, in the 9 governorates that voted in the first phase, while in Cairo, turnout was reported at about 27 percent. An "exceptionally high turnout" was also reported in the governorate of Asyut, especially among women. On the second day of the first round, independent monitors placed the turnout at over 50 percent, while a spokesman for the military said that it could exceed 70 percent, maybe even reaching 80 percent. Abroad, turnout was around 60–70 percent according to the Egyptian foreign minister, and when reading the official results the head of the election committee stated that the overall turnout was 62%, "the highest number since the days of Pharaoh."

First phase run-offs, 5–6 December

The turnout was relatively low according to Al Jazeera, one of the reasons was that the Egyptians were not given a day off as they were given on 28–29 November.

=== Second phase ===
Second phase, 14–15 December

Early reports on the voting turnout indicated a high turnout of long waiting lines, a repeat of the first PR phase voting day. The turnout for the first round was 65%.

Second phase run-offs, 21–22 December

Turnout for the run-offs of the second phase was 43%.

=== Third phase ===
Voter turnout was 62%.

== Results ==
Many individual candidates did not receive the required 50% vote during the first phase, and therefore faced a run-off on 5 December. Even before the official results for each party or coalition-list were released, it was thought, by various international channels as well as leaks from people involved in the count, that the Freedom and Justice Party, led by the Muslim Brotherhood, was expected to receive around 40% of the vote and al-Nour would get between 15–30 percent. The Election Commission announced the participation of 62% of eligible voters, "the highest number since the days of Pharaoh".

In the second phase of the election, some analysts predicted a similar result as that of the previous phase due to the more conservative, poor, and rural nature of the second phase electoral districts. State television reported the initial result, with the FJP in the lead and al-Nour following in second place.

Toward the third phase it was clear that it would be a continuation of the Islamist trend that emerged from the two previous phases.

After the third phase, on 21 January 2012, the Supreme Council of the Armed Forces appointed the remaining 10 MPs.

=== Combined results ===
Note that various media sources report slightly different numbers. This is due to the fact that a number of "independents" and appointed MPs are party members, or joined established parties. In addition, some smaller parties fielded candidates on the official lists of larger allied parties.

Percentage of votes received by party
1. Democratic Alliance (37.5%)
2. Islamist Bloc (27.8%)
3. New Wafd (9.20%)
4. Egyptian Bloc (8.90%)
5. NDP Offshoots (6.40%)
6. Al-Wasat (3.70%)
7. The Revolution Continues (2.80%)
8. Reform and Development (2.20%)
9. Justice Party (0.70%)
10. Other (0.80%)
Total number of parliamentary seats
1. Democratic Alliance (44.9%)
2. Islamist Bloc (25.0%)
3. New Wafd (7.50%)
4. Egyptian Bloc (6.70%)
5. Al-Wasat (1.90%)
6. Reform and Development (1.60%)
7. The Revolution Continues (1.60%)
8. NDP Offshoots (3.50%)
9. Military Appointees (1.90%)
10. Independents (4.70%)
11. Justice Party (0.20%)
12. Other (0.50%)

Summary of the 2011 election for People's Assembly of Egypt
Party	Ideology	Votes	Vote %	PR Seats	FPTP Seats	Total Seats	Component Parties
Democratic Alliance for Egypt (led by the Freedom and Justice Party)	Nationalist-reformist	10,138,134	37.5	127	108	235	Freedom & Justice Party: 213; Dignity Party: 6 Ghad El-Thawra Party: 2 Civilization Party: 2 Islamic Labour Party: 1 Egyptian Arab Socialist Party: 1 Egyptian Reform Party: 1 Affiliated Independents 9
Islamist Bloc (led by Al-Nour Party)	Islamist - Salafi	7,534,266	27.8	96	25 or 27	121 or 123	Al-Nour Party: 107; Building & Development Party: 13; Authenticity Party: 3
New Wafd Party	National-liberal	2,480,391	9.2	37	4	41	
Egyptian Bloc	Centre-left/Secular	2,402,238	8.9	33	2 or 1	35 or 34	Social Democratic Party: 16; Free Egyptians Party: 15; Tagammu: 4
Al-Wasat Party	Moderate Islamist	989,003	3.7	10	0	10	
The Revolution Continues Alliance	Leftist	745,863	2.8	7	2	9	Socialist Popular Alliance Party: 7 Freedom Egypt Party: 1 Equality & Development Party: 1
Reform and Development Party	Liberal	604,415	2.2	8	1	9	
Freedom Party	NDP offshoot	514,029	1.9	4	0	4	
National Party of Egypt	NDP offshoot	425,021	1.6	4	1	5	
Egyptian Citizen Party	NDP offshoot	235,395	0.9	3	1	4	
Union Party	NDP offshoot	141,382	0.5	2	0	2	
Conservative Party	NDP offshoot	272,910	1.0	0	1	1	
Democratic Peace Party	NDP offshoot	248,281	0.9	1	0	1	
Justice Party	Centrist-secular	184,553	0.7	0	1	1	
Arab Egyptian Unity Party	NDP offshoot	149,253	0.6	1	0	1	
Nasserist Party	Nasserist			1	0	1	
Independents	Independents	-	-	-	19	19	
Total elected	elected MPs	27,065,135	100.00	332	166	498	
SCAF appointees	non-elected MPs	-	-	-	-	10	
Total	MPs	-	-	-	-	508	
Sources: Ahram Online, Al-Masry Al-Youm, Al-Ahram

=== First phase ===
First phase assigned seats
1. FJP (49.0%)
2. Al-Nour (20.0%)
3. Egyptian Bloc (10.0%)
4. New Wafd (7.00%)
5. Revolution Continues (4.00%)
6. Al-Wasat (3.00%)
7. Reform and Development (1.00%)
8. Other (6.00%)
- On 4 and 6 December, the result from the first phase of the proportional representation was released. Although PR seats are assigned per district, party lists must pass a national threshold of 0.5% to be eligible to get seats on the district level. The Egyptian authorities did release seat allocation for the constituency (bloc voting) seats.

The number of PR seats shown in this table are unofficial calculations from Jadaliyya using the largest remainder method. Unofficial results are italicised:

Party	Ideology	PR Votes	PR Vote %	PR Seats^{3}	FPTP Seats^{4}	Total Seats	Seat
Freedom and Justice^{1}	Muslim Brotherhood Islamist	3,565,092	36.6	40	33	73	49%
Al-Nour ^{2}	Salafi Islamist	2,371,713	24.4	26	4	30	20%
Egyptian Bloc	Liberal democrats	1,299,819	13.4	13	2	15	10%
New Wafd	National liberals	690,077	7.1	10	1	11	7%
Al-Wasat	Moderate Islamic/Liberal Democratic	415,590	4.3	4	0	4	3%
Revolution Continues	Leftists	335,947	3.5	4	2	6	4%
Reform and Development	Liberals	185,138	1.9	2	0	2	1%
National Party of Egypt	Former NDP Members	153,429	1.6	1	1	2	1%
Freedom	Former NDP Members	136,784	1.4	1	0	1	<1%
Justice	Centrists	76,769	0.8	0	1	1	<1%
Conservative	Conservatives	76,743	0.8	0	0	0	0%
Egyptian Citizen	Former NDP Members	67,602	0.7	1	1	2	1%
Democratic Peace Party	Liberal Democracy	51,704	0.5	0	0	0	0%
Other/Independents	----	308,106	3.2	0	3	3	2%
Total		9,734,513	100	102	48	150	100

Notes: ^{1}Freedom and Justice list includes candidates from the parties of the Democratic Alliance for Egypt. ^{2}Al-Nour's list includes candidates from the parties of the Alliance for Egypt ("Islamist Bloc"). ^{3}Preliminary results, includes all but Cairo's party-list district No. 1 (10 seats), annulled by the Higher Elections Commission, and scheduled to re-vote on 10–11 January. ^{4}Includes all but two races in Cairo's district No. 1, two races in Alexandria's district No. 3, two races in Assiut district No. 2 and two races in Assiut's district No. 3 (a total of 8 seats), scheduled for a re-vote on 10–11 January.

=== Second phase ===
Second phase assigned seats
1. FJP (48.0%)
2. Al-Nour (28.0%)
3. New Wafd (8.00%)
4. Egyptian Bloc (6.00%)
5. Al-Wasat (2.00%)
6. Reform and Development (2.00%)
7. Other (6.00%)

In the second phase, various secular parties, including the New Wafd, Adl, Egyptian Bloc, and Revolution Continues, attempted to coordinate their efforts with regard to some constituency (bloc voting) seats.

On 24 December 2011, official results were announced:

Party	Ideology	PR Votes	PR Vote %	PR Seats^{1}	FPTP Seats^{2}	Total Seats	Seat
Freedom and Justice	Muslim Brotherhood Islamist	4,058,498	36.3	35	36	71	48%
Al-Nour	Salafi Islamist	3,216,430	28.8	28	13	41	28%
New Wafd	National liberals	1,077,244	9.6	11	0	11	8%
Egyptian Bloc	Liberal democrats	785,084	7.0	8	0	8	6%
Al-Wasat	Moderate Islamic/Liberal Democratic	368,375	3.3	3	0	3	2%
Reform and Development	Liberals	231,713	2.1	2	1	3	2%
National Party of Egypt	Former NDP Members	169,662	1.5	1	0	1	<1%
Revolution Continues	Leftists	161,594	1.4	1	0	1	<1%
Egyptian Citizen	Former NDP Members	151,314	1.4	1	0	1	<1%
Conservative	Conservatives	139,100	1.2	0	0	0	0%
Democratic Peace	Liberal democracy	121,694	1.1	0	0	0	0%
Freedom	Former NDP Members	97,165	0.9	0	0	0	0%
Justice	Centrists	46,681	0.4	0	1	1	<1%
Other/Independents	----			2	5	7	5%
Total		11,173,818		92	56	148	

Notes: ^{1} Does not include the postponed or invalidated results of Aswan, Beheira (district 2), Sohag (district 2), and Menoufia (district 1). ^{2} Does not include the invalidated results of Shaqiya's districts 5 and 2.

=== Third phase ===
Party	Ideology	PR Votes	PR Vote %	PR Seats	FPTP Seats	Total Seats	Seat
Freedom and Justice Party	Muslim Brotherhood Islamist			37			
Al-Nour Party	Salafi Islamist			29			
New Wafd Party	National liberals			13			
Egyptian Bloc	Liberal democrats			6			
Reform and Development	Liberals			4			
Revolution Continues	Leftists			3			
Freedom	Former NDP Members			3			
National Party of Egypt	Former NDP Members			2			
Al-Wasat Party	Moderate Islamist/Liberal Democratic			1			
Nasserist	Left-wing nationalism			1			
Union (Hizb al-Ittihad)	Former NDP Members			1			
Justice Party (Adl)	Centrists			0			
Conservative Party	Conservatives			0			
Egyptian Citizen	Former NDP Members			0			
Democratic Peace	Liberal democracy			0			
Other	----			0			
Total				100			

=== PR per governorate and district ===
The PR votes were released by the official election committee. Seats were computed by Jadaliyya. The official results were then released by the supreme committee of elections.

Proportional Representation
Alexandria Governorate
PR District	FJP		Egyptian Bloc		Nour		Revolution Continues		New Wafd		Wasat		Former NDP Parties		Others		Total
PR District	Votes (%)	Seats	Votes (%)	Seats	Votes (%)	Seats	Votes (%)	Seats	Votes (%)	Seats	Votes (%)	Seats	Votes (%)	Seats	Votes (%)	Seats	Seats
1st	34.41%	2	16.02%	1	29.85%	2	4.11%	0	6.40%	1	3.27%	0		0		0	6
2nd	35.32%	4	6.15%	1	32.96%	3	10.04%	1	5.55%	1	1.73%	0		0		0	10
Aswan Governorate
PR District	FJP		Egyptian Bloc		Nour		Revolution Continues		New Wafd		Wasat		Former NDP Parties		Others		Total
PR District	Votes (%)	Seats	Votes (%)	Seats	Votes (%)	Seats	Votes (%)	Seats	Votes (%)	Seats	Votes (%)	Seats	Votes (%)	Seats	Votes (%)	Seats	Seats
1st	32.4%	1	8.6%	1	25.8%	1	2.7%	0	9.9%	1	1.8%	0		0		0	4
Asyut Governorate
PR District	FJP		Egyptian Bloc		Nour		Revolution Continues		New Wafd		Wasat		Former NDP Parties		Others		Total
PR District	Votes (%)	Seats	Votes (%)	Seats	Votes (%)	Seats	Votes (%)	Seats	Votes (%)	Seats	Votes (%)	Seats	Votes (%)	Seats	Votes (%)	Seats	Seats
1st	39.77%	3	20.31%	2	20.84%	2	1.84%	0	3.73%	1	3.33%	0		0		0	8
2nd	32.57%	3	18.19%	2	25.96%	2	N/A	0	3.57%	0	1.58%	0		0	5.65%	1	8
Beheira Governorate
PR District	FJP		Egyptian Bloc		Nour		Revolution Continues		New Wafd		Wasat		Former NDP Parties		Others		Total
PR District	Votes (%)	Seats	Votes (%)	Seats	Votes (%)	Seats	Votes (%)	Seats	Votes (%)	Seats	Votes (%)	Seats	Votes (%)	Seats	Votes (%)	Seats	Seats
1st	35.69%	4	4.38%	1	40.01%	5	2.17%	0	8.78%	1	N/A	0	3.21%	1		0	12
2nd	34.7%	3	2.1%	0	36.5%	3	1.3%	0	8.5%	1	2.0%	0	4.0%	1		0	8
Beni Suef Governorate
PR District	FJP		Egyptian Bloc		Nour		Revolution Continues		New Wafd		Wasat		Former NDP Parties		Others		Total
PR District	Votes (%)	Seats	Votes (%)	Seats	Votes (%)	Seats	Votes (%)	Seats	Votes (%)	Seats	Votes (%)	Seats	Votes (%)	Seats	Votes (%)	Seats	Seats
1st	39.47%	3	N/A	0	35.00%	3	3.28%	1	11.42%	1	3.08%	0		0		0	8
2nd	43.17%	2	9.93%	1	32.02%	1	N/A	0	7.54%	0	N/A	0		0		0	4
Cairo Governorate
PR District	FJP		Egyptian Bloc		Nour		Revolution Continues		New Wafd		Wasat		Former NDP Parties		Others		Total
PR District	Votes (%)	Seats	Votes (%)	Seats	Votes (%)	Seats	Votes (%)	Seats	Votes (%)	Seats	Votes (%)	Seats	Votes (%)	Seats	Votes (%)	Seats	Seats
1st	39.4%	4	24.2%	3	14.7%	2	2.9%	0	6.6%	1	3.5%	0		0		0	10
2nd	35.65%	3	26.22%	2	11.31%	1	4.18%	0	5.76%	1	7.22%	1		0		0	8
3rd	39.94%	3	18.33%	2	14.52%	1	3.45%	1	14.67%	1	2.93%	0		0		0	8
4th	40.48%	4	13.14%	1	19.35%	2	3.62%	1	7.32%	1	3.39%	1		0		0	10
Dakahlia Governorate
PR District	FJP		Egyptian Bloc		Nour		Revolution Continues		New Wafd		Wasat		Former NDP Parties		Others		Total
PR District	Votes (%)	Seats	Votes (%)	Seats	Votes (%)	Seats	Votes (%)	Seats	Votes (%)	Seats	Votes (%)	Seats	Votes (%)	Seats	Votes (%)	Seats	Seats
1st	33.2%	3	1.4%	0	25.4%	2	15.3%	1	9.1%	1	1.2%	0	8.3%	1		0	8
2nd	38.7%	3	2.1%	0	29.0%	3	8.8%	1	11.8%	1	1.4%	0		0		0	8
3rd	32.4%	3	2.2%	0	26.4%	2	11.2%	1	6.2%	1	1.9%	0	4.0%	1		0	8
Damietta Governorate
PR District	FJP		Egyptian Bloc		Nour		Revolution Continues		New Wafd		Wasat		Former NDP Parties		Others		Total
PR District	Votes (%)	Seats	Votes (%)	Seats	Votes (%)	Seats	Votes (%)	Seats	Votes (%)	Seats	Votes (%)	Seats	Votes (%)	Seats	Votes (%)	Seats	Seats
1st	31.14%	3	3.38%	0	38.58%	3	0.73%	0	4.53%	1	13.59%	1		0		0	8
Faiyum Governorate
PR District	FJP		Egyptian Bloc		Nour		Revolution Continues		New Wafd		Wasat		Former NDP Parties		Others		Total
PR District	Votes (%)	Seats	Votes (%)	Seats	Votes (%)	Seats	Votes (%)	Seats	Votes (%)	Seats	Votes (%)	Seats	Votes (%)	Seats	Votes (%)	Seats	Seats
1st	44.89%	4	2.26%	0	29.06%	2	5.01%	1	3.58%	0	3.95%	0	5.95	1		0	8
2nd	45.05%	2	5.61%	0	40.03%	2	N/A	0	N/A	0	1.59%	0		0		0	4
Gharbia Governorate
PR District	FJP		Egyptian Bloc		Nour		Revolution Continues		New Wafd		Wasat		Former NDP Parties		Others		Total
PR District	Votes (%)	Seats	Votes (%)	Seats	Votes (%)	Seats	Votes (%)	Seats	Votes (%)	Seats	Votes (%)	Seats	Votes (%)	Seats	Votes (%)	Seats	Seats
1st	28.7%	3	7.4%	1	29.7%	3	3.3%	0	13.8%	2	1.9%	0		0	4.6%	1	10
2nd	37.6%	4	4.7%	1	28.9%	3	N/A	0	17.3%	2	2.2%	0		0		0	10
Giza Governorate
PR District	FJP		Egyptian Bloc		Nour		Revolution Continues		New Wafd		Wasat		Former NDP Parties		Others		Total
PR District	Votes (%)	Seats	Votes (%)	Seats	Votes (%)	Seats	Votes (%)	Seats	Votes (%)	Seats	Votes (%)	Seats	Votes (%)	Seats	Votes (%)	Seats	Seats
1st	41.09%	4	10.52%	1	29.10%	3	N/A	0	7.80%	1	5.75%	1		0		0	10
2nd	37.83%	4	10.05%	1	28.12%	3	2.77%	0	4.60%	1	6.04%	1		0		0	10
Ismailia Governorate
PR District	FJP		Egyptian Bloc		Nour		Revolution Continues		New Wafd		Wasat		Former NDP Parties		Others		Total
PR District	Votes (%)	Seats	Votes (%)	Seats	Votes (%)	Seats	Votes (%)	Seats	Votes (%)	Seats	Votes (%)	Seats	Votes (%)	Seats	Votes (%)	Seats	Seats
1st	38.19%	2	6.65%	0	27.63%	1	N/A	0	7.40%	1	2.11%	0		0		0	4
Kafr el-Sheikh Governorate
PR District	FJP		Egyptian Bloc		Nour		Revolution Continues		New Wafd		Wasat		Former NDP Parties		Others		Total
PR District	Votes (%)	Seats	Votes (%)	Seats	Votes (%)	Seats	Votes (%)	Seats	Votes (%)	Seats	Votes (%)	Seats	Votes (%)	Seats	Votes (%)	Seats	Seats
1st	29.83%	3	N/A	0	38.92%	3	N/A	0	12.16%	1	1.67%	0		0	7.04%	1	8
2nd	31.12%	1	2.30%	0	22.40%	1	5.92%	0	15.36%	1	6.56%	0	10.49%	1		0	4
Luxor Governorate
PR District	FJP		Egyptian Bloc		Nour		Revolution Continues		New Wafd		Wasat		Former NDP Parties		Others		Total
PR District	Votes (%)	Seats	Votes (%)	Seats	Votes (%)	Seats	Votes (%)	Seats	Votes (%)	Seats	Votes (%)	Seats	Votes (%)	Seats	Votes (%)	Seats	Seats
1st	36.90%	2	12.99%	1	15.78%	1	N/A	0	11.06%	0	3.14%	0		0		0	4
Matruh Governorate
PR District	FJP		Egyptian Bloc		Nour		Revolution Continues		New Wafd		Wasat		Former NDP Parties		Others		Total
PR District	Votes (%)	Seats	Votes (%)	Seats	Votes (%)	Seats	Votes (%)	Seats	Votes (%)	Seats	Votes (%)	Seats	Votes (%)	Seats	Votes (%)	Seats	Seats
1st	16.9%	1	2.0%	0	79.2%	3	N/A	0	7.9%	0	4.0%	0		0		0	4
Minya Governorate
PR District	FJP		Egyptian Bloc		Nour		Revolution Continues		New Wafd		Wasat		Former NDP Parties		Others		Total
PR District	Votes (%)	Seats	Votes (%)	Seats	Votes (%)	Seats	Votes (%)	Seats	Votes (%)	Seats	Votes (%)	Seats	Votes (%)	Seats	Votes (%)	Seats	Seats
1st	46.3%	4	5.7%	0	22.2%	2	1.0%	0	3.8%	0	6.4%	1	12.9%	1		0	8
2nd	35.8%	3	19.6%	2	28.1%	2	N/A	0	6.7%	1	4.1%	0		0		0	8
Monufia Governorate
PR District	FJP		Egyptian Bloc		Nour		Revolution Continues		New Wafd		Wasat		Former NDP Parties		Others		Total
PR District	Votes (%)	Seats	Votes (%)	Seats	Votes (%)	Seats	Votes (%)	Seats	Votes (%)	Seats	Votes (%)	Seats	Votes (%)	Seats	Votes (%)	Seats	Seats
1st	34.0%	3	6.1%	0	22.3%	2	N/A	0	11.2%	1	4.9%	0	8.5%	1	7.3%	1	8
2nd	39.18%	3	N/A	0	15.96%	1	1.64%	0	25.41%	2	2.52%	0	5.81%	1	5.85%	1	8
New Valley Governorate
PR District	FJP		Egyptian Bloc		Nour		Revolution Continues		New Wafd		Wasat		Former NDP Parties		Others		Total
PR District	Votes (%)	Seats	Votes (%)	Seats	Votes (%)	Seats	Votes (%)	Seats	Votes (%)	Seats	Votes (%)	Seats	Votes (%)	Seats	Votes (%)	Seats	Seats
1st	26.4%	1	7.5%	1	39.9%	2	N/A	0	4.0%	0	0.9%	0		0		0	4
North Sinai Governorate
PR District	FJP		Egyptian Bloc		Nour		Revolution Continues		New Wafd		Wasat		Former NDP Parties		Others		Total
PR District	Votes (%)	Seats	Votes (%)	Seats	Votes (%)	Seats	Votes (%)	Seats	Votes (%)	Seats	Votes (%)	Seats	Votes (%)	Seats	Votes (%)	Seats	Seats
1st	35.3%	2	1.6%	0	26.6%	1	N/A	0	5.7%	0	7.1%	0		0	9.4%	1	4
Port Said Governorate
PR District	FJP		Egyptian Bloc		Nour		Revolution Continues		New Wafd		Wasat		Former NDP Parties		Others		Total
PR District	Votes (%)	Seats	Votes (%)	Seats	Votes (%)	Seats	Votes (%)	Seats	Votes (%)	Seats	Votes (%)	Seats	Votes (%)	Seats	Votes (%)	Seats	Seats
1st	32.66%	1	9.65%	0	20.69%	1	1.85%	0	13.89%	1	12.88%	1		0		0	4
Qalyubia Governorate
PR District	FJP		Egyptian Bloc		Nour		Revolution Continues		New Wafd		Wasat		Former NDP Parties		Others		Total
PR District	Votes (%)	Seats	Votes (%)	Seats	Votes (%)	Seats	Votes (%)	Seats	Votes (%)	Seats	Votes (%)	Seats	Votes (%)	Seats	Votes (%)	Seats	Seats
1st	35.4%	2	3.0%	0	25.5%	1	2.2%	0	14.4%	1	7.1%	0		0		0	4
2nd	38.3%	3	7.3%	1	29.5%	3	1.5%	0	6.5%	1	2.2%	0		0		0	8
Qena Governorate
PR District	FJP		Egyptian Bloc		Nour		Revolution Continues		New Wafd		Wasat		Former NDP Parties		Others		Total
PR District	Votes (%)	Seats	Votes (%)	Seats	Votes (%)	Seats	Votes (%)	Seats	Votes (%)	Seats	Votes (%)	Seats	Votes (%)	Seats	Votes (%)	Seats	Seats
1st	32.6%	2	N/A	0	21.9%	1	2.8%	0	8.9%	0	2.4%	0	10.1%	1		0	4
2nd	26.0%	3	N/A	0	19.2%	2	N/A	0	6.0%	1	3.4%	0	17.0%	2		TBD	8
Red Sea Governorate
PR District	FJP		Egyptian Bloc		Nour		Revolution Continues		New Wafd		Wasat		Former NDP Parties		Others		Total
PR District	Votes (%)	Seats	Votes (%)	Seats	Votes (%)	Seats	Votes (%)	Seats	Votes (%)	Seats	Votes (%)	Seats	Votes (%)	Seats	Votes (%)	Seats	Seats
1st	35.69%	2	17.01%	1	N/A	0	4.19%	0	9.69%	0	5.51%	0	14.23%	1		0	4
Sharqia Governorate
PR District	FJP		Egyptian Bloc		Nour		Revolution Continues		New Wafd		Wasat		Former NDP Parties		Others		Total
PR District	Votes (%)	Seats	Votes (%)	Seats	Votes (%)	Seats	Votes (%)	Seats	Votes (%)	Seats	Votes (%)	Seats	Votes (%)	Seats	Votes (%)	Seats	Seats
1st	37.99%	4	6.68%	1	26.55%	3	2.01%	0	10.53%	1	2.23%	1		0		0	10
2nd	35.54%	4	3.81%	0	20.80%	2	0.90%	0	13.95%	2	3.01%	0		0	8.75%	2	10
Sohag Governorate
PR District	FJP		Egyptian Bloc		Nour		Revolution Continues		New Wafd		Wasat		Former NDP Parties		Others		Total
PR District	Votes (%)	Seats	Votes (%)	Seats	Votes (%)	Seats	Votes (%)	Seats	Votes (%)	Seats	Votes (%)	Seats	Votes (%)	Seats	Votes (%)	Seats	Seats
1st	28.42%	4	15.96%	2	29.33%	4	1.23%	0	4.65%	1	2.78%	0		TBD	2.84%	1	12
2nd	23.0%	2	10.8%	1	25.3%	2	0.5%	0	4.9%	0	6.2%	1	7.4%	1	8.3%	1	8
South Sinai Governorate
PR District	FJP		Egyptian Bloc		Nour		Revolution Continues		New Wafd		Wasat		Former NDP Parties		Others		Total
PR District	Votes (%)	Seats	Votes (%)	Seats	Votes (%)	Seats	Votes (%)	Seats	Votes (%)	Seats	Votes (%)	Seats	Votes (%)	Seats	Votes (%)	Seats	Seats
1st	39.8%	2	9.9%	0	N/A	0	N/A	0	18.7%	1	1.9%	0		0	19.4%	1	4
Suez Governorate
PR District	FJP		Egyptian Bloc		Nour		Revolution Continues		New Wafd		Wasat		Former NDP Parties		Others		Total
PR District	Votes (%)	Seats	Votes (%)	Seats	Votes (%)	Seats	Votes (%)	Seats	Votes (%)	Seats	Votes (%)	Seats	Votes (%)	Seats	Votes (%)	Seats	Seats
1st	26.84%	1	8.37%	1	45.55%	2	N/A	0	4.63%	0	5.13%	0		0		0	4

Note: Vote percentage reported for "Others" and "Former NDP Parties" is for those parties that won seats

=== Violence ===
A day after polls closed during the second phase of election to the lower house, clashes broke out again in front of the parliament and cabinet building in Cairo between security forces and several hundred demonstrators. The demonstrators were protesting against the appointment of a new prime minister by the military council, and against the arrest and beating of one of the protesters there.

=== Reactions ===
The commander of the military police was quoted as saying that the ruling military council was not taking sides during the second phase of the election to the lower house and "stands at an equal distance" from all the political groups contesting the elections: "The army has no interest to be served by siding with liberals or the Brotherhood or leftists or others."

Following reports that the FJP was likely leading in the first round of the election, with al-Nour in second place, the FJP denied it would seek an alliance with Al-Nour.

== Dissolution, reinstatement decree ==
On 14 June 2012, the Supreme Constitutional Court of Egypt ruled that the election was unconstitutional, and one third of the winners were illegitimate. The ruling was due, in part, to the fact that some seats were contested on a proportional list system, while others were contested on the first-past-the-post system. As a result, the court concluded, the election law had allowed political parties to compete for seats intended for independent candidates. "The makeup of the entire chamber is illegal and, consequently, it does not legally stand", explained the court. The ruling upheld a lower court decision, which had found the election law unconstitutional. The Muslim Brotherhood-affiliated Freedom and Justice Party held the majority of the seats ruled unconstitutional.

In a separate ruling issued at the same time, the court threw out the Political Exclusion Law, which banned former members of President Hosni Mubarak's regime from running for office. The court concluded the law was not based on "objective grounds", and violated "the principle of equality". The court judges had all been appointed by Mubarak.

The ruling raised fears (in some) of the military trying to increase its power. The Muslim Brotherhood's popularity had decreased since the election, so new elections could result in a decrease of their seats in parliament. The dissolution of parliament creates the possibility of the panel to be tasked with writing a new constitution being appointed by the military. A politician from the Freedom and Justice Party predicted the ruling would send the country into a "dark tunnel". Other observers called the move a coup attempt and "a complete disregard for the free will of voters".In contrast, Ahmed Shafiq, who served as prime minister under Mubarak, called the ruling a "historic ... verdict that meant there was no way for anyone to do particular laws for particular people".

Angry protesters gathered outside the court building after the decision. Police in riot gear guarded the building.

Re-institution of the parliament has since been demanded by the protesters, the Muslim Brotherhood and others. Mohammed Morsi, sworn as Egypt's new president on 30 June, has initially refrained from speaking publicly on that (crucial to the extent of his own real power) issue. In his inauguration speech on 30 June, however, he gave an indication of his future efforts, calling the parliamentary election "free and fair". Within days of Morsi's inauguration, according to his spokesman, the President is actively searching for ways of restoring the parliament and obtaining a release of non-criminal political detainees.

A presidential decree was released on 8 July 2012, reinstating parliament until a new one is elected and mandating that it would write the new constitution instead of the Constitutional Assembly. The decree challenges the powers claimed by the SCAF military council. The Supreme Constitutional Court called that decree into question on 9 July 2012.

== See also ==
- Results of the 2011–12 Egyptian parliamentary election
- 2012 Egyptian presidential election
