= The Revolution Continues Alliance =

Defunct Egyptian electoral alliance

The Revolution Continues Alliance تحالف الثورة مستمرة
- Founded: 23 October 2011
- Dissolved: 2012
- Political position: Centre-left; Big tent

The Revolution Continues Alliance (Arabic: تحالف الثورة مستمرة, Taḥaluf al-ṯẖawra mustamirra, sometimes referred to as Istikmāl al-ṯẖawra or Completing the Revolution), abbreviated to RCA, was a left-leaning, mostly secular electoral alliance in Egypt that competed in the 2011–12 Egyptian parliamentary election.

== History ==
Founding members of the alliance included the "Socialist Popular Alliance Party..., the Egyptian Socialist Party, Egyptian Current Party..., Freedom Egypt Party,... Equality and Development Party, the Revolution Youth Coalition, the Egyptian Alliance, and a new workers' party pending registration approval headed by Mohamed El-Jilany." The alliance had announced its electoral platform on 23 October 2011, one day before the deadline for the parliamentary election starting on 24 November.

The formation followed a conflict inside the broad left-leaning secular and liberal Egyptian Bloc over the participation of exponents of the old regime and the dominance of a few parties within the bloc. When they could not enforce their demands, the Socialist Popular Alliance Party and the Egyptian Socialist Party left the Bloc. The alliance's electoral campaign was launched on 2 November. The aim of the alliance was to keep the revolutionary spirit in the parliament and to achieve all the demands of the 2011 Egyptian revolution.

According to a November 2011 article on the alliance by The Guardian, it was not expected to win many seats.

The alliance is effectively defunct since almost all of the parties in the coalition have left it. The Egyptian Current Party and Egypt Freedom Party have gone on to join other coalitions. The Coalition of Revolutionary Youth disbanded in July 2012. The Socialist Popular Alliance Party and the Egyptian Socialist Party decided to merge into one socialist party. The Socialist Popular Alliance Party joined the Revolutionary Democratic Coalition.

== Electoral history ==
=== People's Assembly elections ===
Election	Seats	+/–
2011–12	9 / 596	▲9

== Former component parties ==
- Socialist Popular Alliance Party
- Socialist Party of Egypt
- Egyptian Current Party
- Egyptian Alliance Party
- Equality and Development Party
- Coalition of the Youth of the Revolution
- Freedom Egypt Party
