= Okasha =

Okasha (Arabic: عكاشة) is an Egyptian surname that may refer to

- Ahmed Okasha, Egyptian psychiatrist
- Motaz Okasha (born 1990), Egyptian basketball player
- Osama Anwar Okasha (1941–2010), Egyptian screenwriter and journalist
- Samir Okasha, Professor of Philosophy of Science at University of Bristol, UK
- Tawfik Okasha, Egyptian television presenter
- Tharwat Okasha (born 1921), Egyptian writer, translator and government official
