= Egyptian Citizen Party =

Egyptian Citizen Party حزب المواطن المصري
- Chairman: Mohamed Ragab
- Founded: 31 July 2011
- Dissolved: 18 September 2012
- Split from: National Democratic Party
- Merged into: Conference Party
- Headquarters: Cairo
- Ideology: Big tent Populism
- House of Representatives: 0 / 568

The Egyptian Citizen Party was an Egyptian political party made up of former members of the NDP. It is led by former NDP secretary-general Mohamed Ragab; other former NDP members include Hamdi El-Sayed, Abdel Ahad Gamal El Din and Nabil Louka Bibawi.

== Electoral history ==
=== People's Assembly elections ===
Election	Seats	+/–
2011–12	4 / 596	▲4
