= Egyptian Bloc =

Defunct Egyptian electoral alliance

The Egyptian Bloc الكتلة المصرية
- Founded: 16 August 2011
- Dissolved: 19 September 2012
- Ideology: Liberalism; Secularism
- Political position: Centre-left
- Colors: Red, White and Black

Website
- http://www.elkotlaelmasreya.com/

The Egyptian Bloc (Arabic: الكتلة المصرية, al-kutla al-miṣrīya) was an electoral alliance in Egypt. It was formed in August 2011 by several liberal, social democratic, and leftist political parties and movements, as well as the traditional Islamist Sufi Liberation Party to prevent the Muslim Brotherhood, and its affiliated Freedom and Justice Party, from winning the parliamentary election in November of that year. As of September 2012, all former constituent parties left the bloc, joined other alliances or merged into other parties.

== History ==
=== Establishment ===
The 15 groups, which included the Democratic Front Party, the Free Egyptians Party, the "Farmers Syndicate", the Egyptian Liberation Party and the New Wafd Party, shared the common vision of Egypt as a "civil democratic state", and feared that in case of an Islamist electoral victory the constitution could be changed to an Islamic one.

The establishment of the coalition was publicly announced on 15 August 2011 in Cairo. The assembly's objective is to present a united list of candidates for the parliamentary election, to raise funds and to campaign together. The alliance supports Prime Minister Essam Sharaf's proposal of a "constitutional decree" that could prevent the Islamists from unilaterally amending the constitution or drafting a new one, even in case of winning a parliamentary majority. Analysts see the formation as a "final attempt" of the liberal and secularist camp to cope with the Muslim Brotherhood's advance in Egypt's post-revolutionary political landscape, in respect of organisational structure, profile and publicity.

Several leading members of the long-standing national-liberal New Wafd Party have also joined the alliance, even though the party had announced to contest the elections together with the Freedom and Justice Party.

=== Withdrawals ===
In late October 2011, the Socialist Popular Alliance Party broke away from the Egyptian Bloc, claiming that the bloc contained remnants of the old regime, and formed The Revolution Continues Alliance. The Egyptian Socialist Party followed this example. The Freedom Egypt Party withdrew from the alliance on 15 October and later joined The Revolution Continues Alliance as well.

The Sufi Liberation Party withdrew from the alliance as it believed the alliance was too slow in finalizing its lists. The Democratic Front Party also withdrew from the alliance.

By early November, only the Free Egyptians Party, the Egyptian Social Democratic Party, and Tagammu remained components of the alliance.

After the elections of 2011/2012, the ESDP left the Bloc, complaining that the other partners were more concerned over the secular-Islamist divide than over the differences between the former regime and the forces of the revolution. The Free Egyptians Party left the alliance in January 2012. In September 2012, the Tagammu Party joined the Revolutionary Democratic Coalition.

== Platform ==
The programmatic ambitions of the alliance are to establish Egypt as a modern civil state in which science plays an important role, and to create equality and social justice in the country. The objectives of the Bloc also include to make a decent life possible for the poorer population, including education, health care and proper housing. It advocates a pluralistic, multi-party democracy and rejects religious, racial, and sexual discrimination.

== Electoral results ==
=== Results of the 2011/2012 parliamentary elections ===
In the 2011/2012 parliamentary elections, the Egyptian Bloc won 2,402,238 votes out of 27,065,135 correct votes, or roughly 8.9% of all votes. The Egyptian Bloc thus received 33 seats out of 332 in the Egyptian Parliament. The 33 seats were divided between members of the Bloc as follows:

- Egyptian Social Democratic Party: 16 seats
- Free Egyptians Party: 14 seats
- National Progressive Unionist Party: 3 seats

In addition, one independent candidate belonging to the Free Egyptians Party won one of the 168 seats allocated for independent candidates.

Thus, the Egyptian Bloc won a total of 34 seats out of 500 (6.8%) in the 2012 Egyptian Parliament, thus becoming the fourth largest political block in the parliament.

=== Shura Council elections ===
During the Shura council elections in January and February 2012, the bloc was divided considering the question whether or not to participate. The Free Egyptians Party decided to boycott the vote, citing the reluctance of authorities to address irregularities during the lower house elections. The ESDP and Tagammu, on the other hand, insisted on fielding candidates.

The Bloc won eight seats.

== Member organisations ==
Former member organisations

- Egyptian Communist Party
- Democratic Front Party (withdrawn)
- Awareness Party
- Sufi Liberation Party (withdrawn)
- Socialist Popular Alliance Party (withdrawn in October 2011)
- Socialist Party of Egypt (withdrawn in October 2011)
- Freedom Egypt Party (withdrawn in October 2011)
- Egyptian Social Democratic Party (withdrawn after the 2011/2012 elections)
- Free Egyptians Party (withdrawn in January 2012)
- National Progressive Unionist Rally Party (Tagammu)

Social and labour organisations

- National Association for Change
- The National Council
- the Farmers' Syndicate
- the Popular Worker's Union
