= 2012 Egyptian Shura Council election =

Election

- 29 January–22 February 2012

180 of 270 seats in the Shura Council Remaining 90 seats appointed by the President
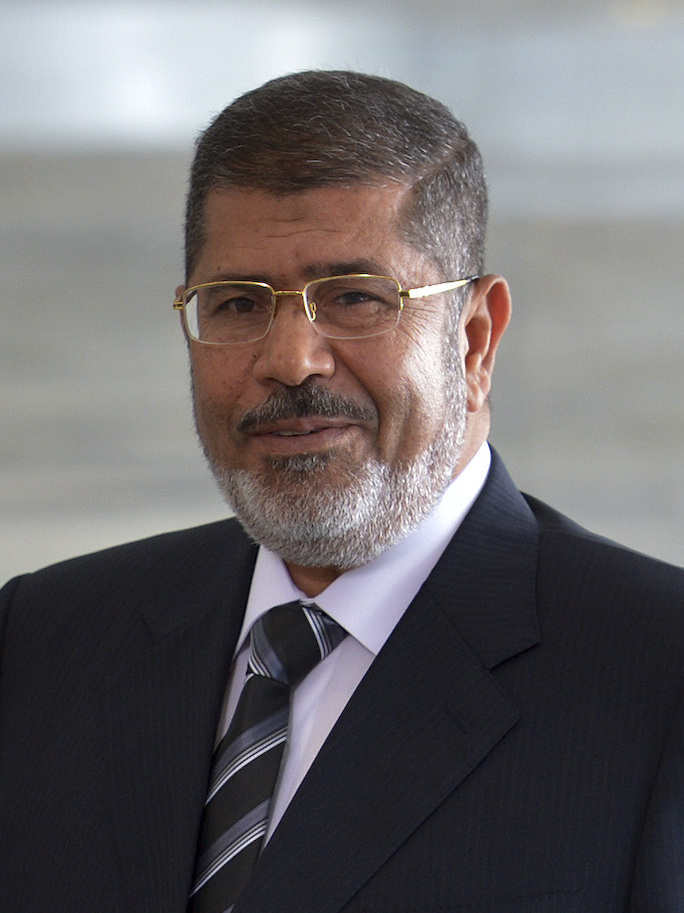

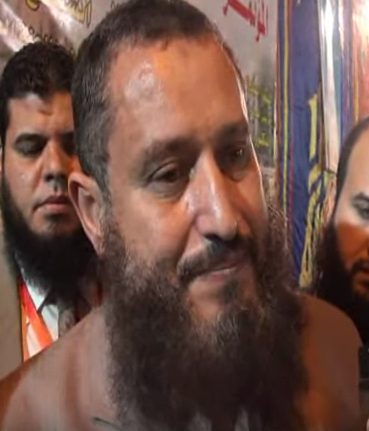

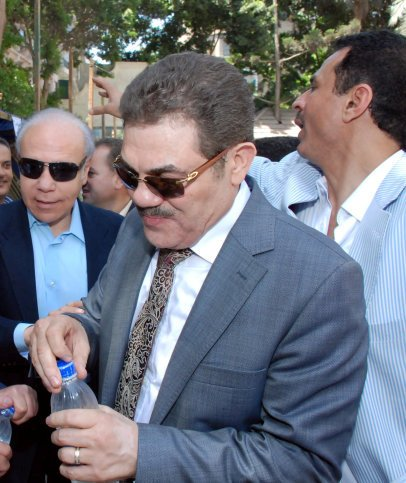

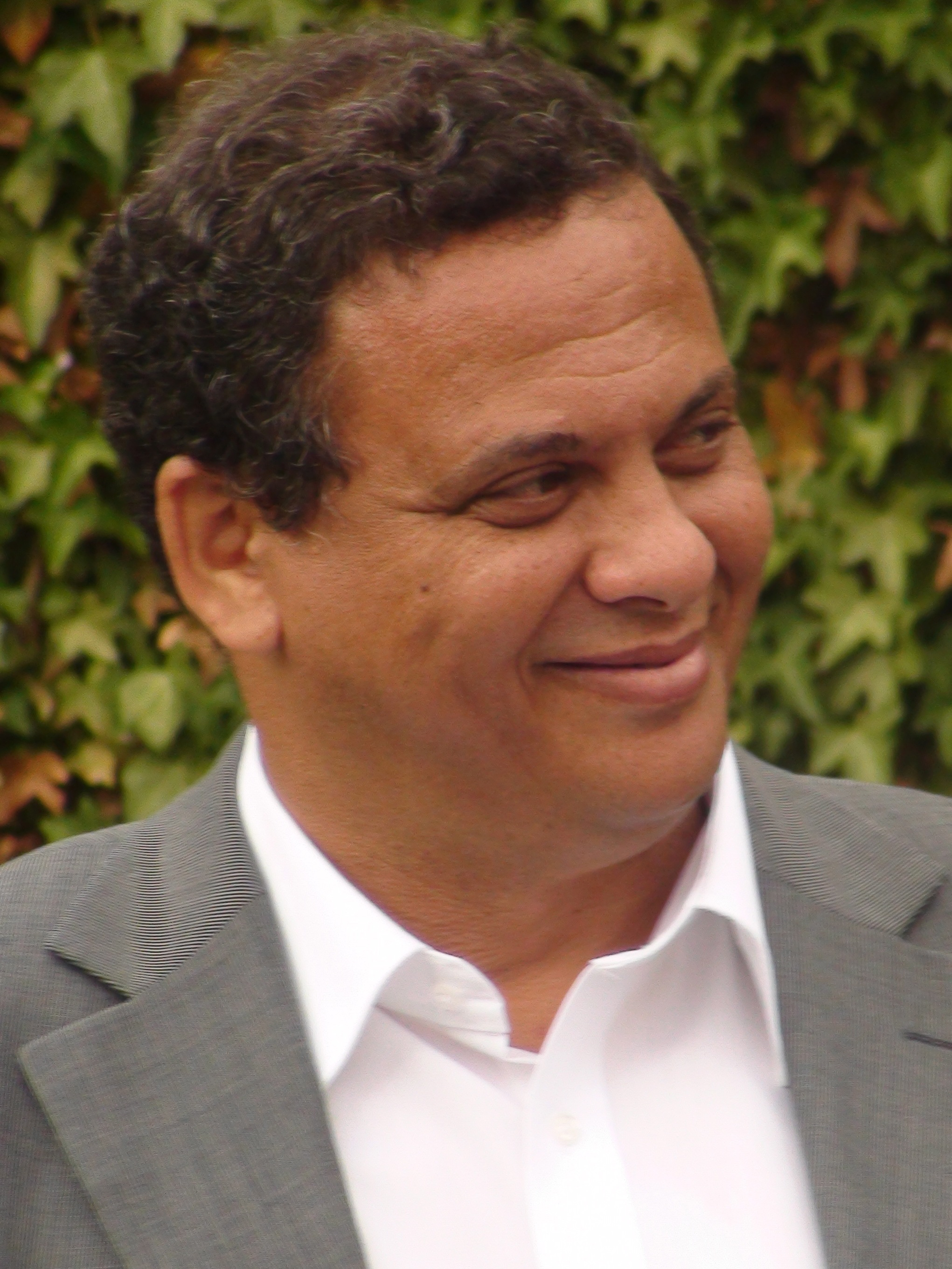
	First party	Second party
Leader	Mohamed Morsi	Emad Abdel Ghaffour
Party	Freedom and Justice	Al-Nour
Seats won	105	45
Popular vote	2,894,922	1,840,014
Percentage	45.04%	28.63%
	Third party	Fourth party
Leader	El-Sayyid el-Badawi	Ahmed Hassan Said
Party	New Wafd	Egyptian Bloc
Seats won	14	8
Popular vote	543,417	348,957
Percentage	8.45%	5.43%
Speaker before election
vacant
Elected Speaker
Ahmed Fahmy
Freedom and Justice

Shura Council elections were held in Egypt between 29 January and 22 February 2012. The Freedom and Justice Party emerged as the largest party in the council, winning 105 of the 180 elected seats.

== Background ==
Parliamentary elections were held in late 2010 and were followed by controversy and repression as well as accusations of fraud.

Following similar events in Tunisia during the Arab Spring, Egyptian activists called for protesters to turn up in cities around Egypt on various specially designated days of rages. Though violence was reported at some points, protests were largely peaceful with the army staying quiet until 10 February 2011, when calls for Hosni Mubarak to resign were at their peak. The following day, Vice President Omar Suleiman announced Mubarak's resignation from the presidency while turning power over to the military. The Supreme Council of the Armed Forces, headed by Field Marshal Mohamed Hussein Tantawi would lead the country for a transitional period until a civilian government takes over.

A constitutional referendum was then approved on 19 March.

== Electoral system ==
At the time of the election the Shura Council had 270 seats, of which 90 were appointed and 180 elected. Of the 180 elected seats, 60 were elected by majority voting in single-member constituencies, and 120 by proportional representation based on the total number of votes cast in the constituencies. Voting was compulsory, with a potential £20 fine for non-voters.

Party lists had to include at least one woman candidate, and had to pass a 0.5% electoral threshold to win a proportional representation seat. For the constituency seats, candidates were required to win over 50% of the vote and for there to be either a farmer or worker elected from their constituency in order to be elected in the first round. Run-offs would be when no candidate won over 50% of the vote in a constituency, and in cases where two candidates achieved over 50%, but neither of them were workers or farmers, the candidate with the highest number of votes would be declared elected, and a run-off held between the highest ranking workers and farmers.

The elections were held in two stages; a first stage on 29 and 30 January, with run-offs on 5 and 6 February, and a second stage on 14 and 15 February, with run-offs on 21 and 22 February. There were originally plans to hold the elections in three stages, with the third stage taking place on 4–5 March and run-offs on 11–12 March, but in early January 2012, the election process was sped up to shorten the transition period.

== Campaign ==
The liberal Free Egyptians Party announced a boycott of the elections, complaining about irregularities during the preceding parliamentary elections and denouncing the Shura Council elections as a "waste of time".

== Results ==
The first phase included the governorates of Alexandria, Asyut, Cairo, Dakahlia, Damietta, Faiyum, Gharbia, Monufia, New Valley, North Sinai, Qena, Red Sea and South Sinai. Voter turnout for the first phase was at 15%, while turnout for its run-off was down to 6%.

The polls of the second phase were held in Giza, Sharqiya, Kafr el-Sheikh, Qalyubia, Aswan, Sohag, Luxor, Beni Suef, Minya, Matrouh, Beheira, Suez, Ismailia and Port Said. The turnout in the second phase on 14–15 February was at 12.2%. According to the Higher Elections Commission, 3 million out of around 25 million eligible voters cast their votes. The number of invalid votes was 252,899.

Party	Proportional			Constituency			Total seats
Party	Votes	%	Seats	Votes	%	Seats	Total seats
Freedom and Justice Party	2,894,922	45.04	56			49	105
Islamist Bloc	1,840,014	28.63	38			7	45
New Wafd Party	543,417	8.45	14			0	14
Egyptian Bloc	348,957	5.43	8			0	8
Democratic Peace Party	95,273	1.48	1			0	1
Freedom Party	84,936	1.32	3			0	3
Other parties	620,147	9.65	–				–
Independents						4	4
Presidential appointees							90
Total	6,427,666	100.00	120			60	270
Source: Supreme Committee for Elections,

== Aftermath ==
During the first Shura Council session on 28 February 2012, Freedom and Justice Party member Ahmed Fahmy was elected speaker.
