= Mohamed Anwar Esmat Sadat =

Egyptian politician (born 1955)

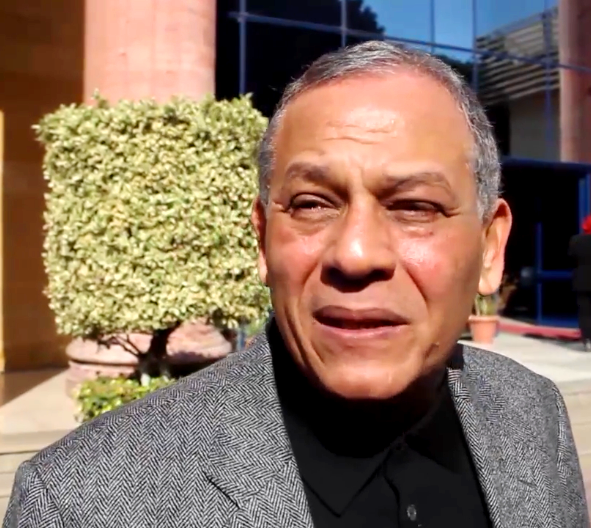
- Mohamed Anwar Esmat Sadat in 2015

Member of the House of Representatives
- In office 10 January 2016 – 27 February 2017

Member of the People's Assembly
- In office 23 January 2012 – 22 September 2012
- In office 12 December 2005 – 27 May 2007

Personal details
- Born: Mohamed Anwar Esmat Sadat; 1955 (age 70–71)
- Party: Reform and Development Party
- Relatives: Talaat Sadat (brother) Anwar Sadat (uncle)
- Occupation: Politician, Member of the Egyptian Parliament

Mohamed Anwar Esmat Sadat (Arabic: محمد أنور عصمت السادات; born 1955) is an Egyptian politician and the current Vice President of the National Council for Human Rights. He was a member of the Egyptian Parliament during the rule of Hosni Mubarak. He is related to two prominent Egyptian politicians, as the nephew of Anwar Sadat and brother of Talaat Sadat. He won a seat during the 2011–12 Egyptian parliamentary election for the second constituency (Fardi) Monufia Governorate and is the founder of the Reform and Development Party along with Raymond Lakah.

He participated actively in Egyptian politics, and in 2005 he was elected to the Egyptian People's Assembly (Parliament) where he was a member of the Foreign Relations Committee and the People's Assembly Economic Committee. He was also an active member of the Egyptian Council for Foreign Affairs (ECFA). He participated in several international conferences and workshops on political, economic and social organization issues held in Egypt, the Arab world and Europe. He wrote for several Egyptian newspapers with private and political interests on development issues in Egypt. He was involved in the establishment of the Sadat Organization for Development and Social Care, and serves currently as its president. In 2006, Al-Sadat submitted a motion in parliament and demanded an investigation into the activities of Mubarak aide and Member of Parliament Zakaria Azmi for corruption allegations. Azmi was sentenced to jail in May 2012.

In 2007, Al-Sadat was kicked out of parliament after declaring bankruptcy. On 27 February 2017, he was kicked out of the parliament again after criticizing Egypt's human rights record. He allegedly “belittled” the Egyptian parliament in correspondence with foreign associations and was accused of falsifying lawmakers' signatures on a draft bill. He intended to run in the 2018 Egyptian presidential election but later withdrew saying that the conditions were not democratic enough for him to run. He could not find a hotel to launch his campaign.
