= National Party of Egypt =

National Party of Egypt حزب مصر القومي Hizb Masr al-Qawmi
- Founder: Talaat Sadat
- Founded: 17 August 2011
- Ideology: Egyptian nationalism
- Political position: Centre
- National affiliation: Egyptian Front
- House of Representatives: 0 / 568

The National Party of Egypt (Arabic: حزب مصر القومي, romanized: Hizb Masr al-Qawmi) is an Egyptian political party made up of former members of the National Democratic Party (NDP).

It was founded and led by Anwar Sadat's nephew, Talaat Sadat, who was the last chairman of the NDP. Another prominent member is Tawfik Okasha.

== Electoral history ==
=== People's Assembly elections ===
Election	Seats	+/–
2011–12	5 / 596	▲5
