= Amr Hamzawy =

Egyptian political scientist and human rights activist (born 1967)

Amr Hamzawy عمرو حمزاوى
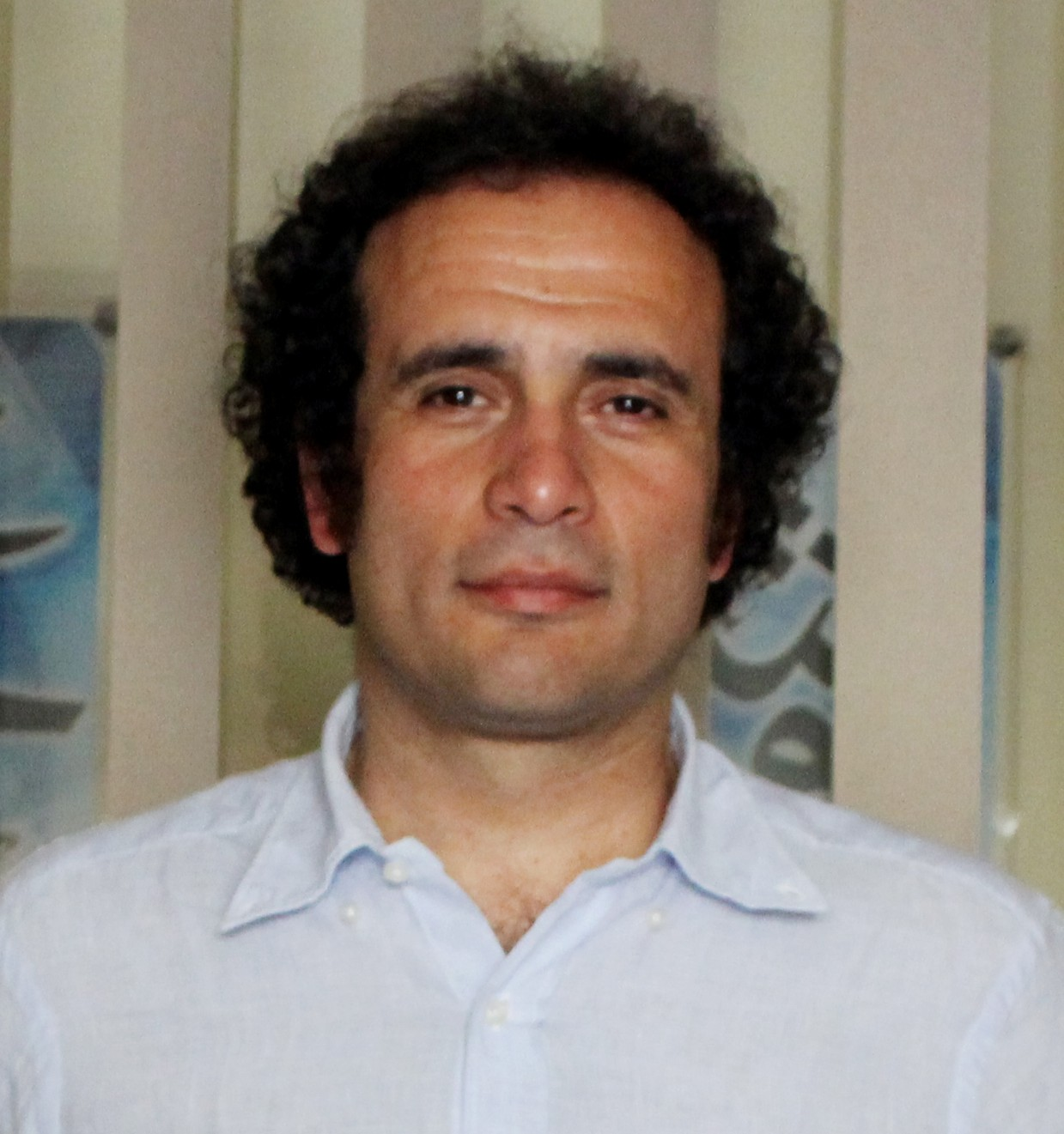
- Amr Hamzawy in 2011

Member of Parliament of Egypt
- In office 23 January 2012 – 16 June 2012
- Constituency: Cairo—Heliopolis

Personal details
- Born: 28 October 1967 (age 58) Minya, Egypt
- Party: President of Freedom Egypt Party
- Occupation: Professor of political science
- Known for: Political activist

Amr Hamzawy (Egyptian Arabic: عمرو حمزاوى, IPA: [ˈʕɑmɾe ħæmˈzæːwi]; born 1967) is an Egyptian political scientist, human rights activist and public intellectual.

== Biography ==
Hamzawy studied political science and developmental studies in Cairo, The Hague, and Berlin. After finishing his doctoral studies and after five years of teaching in Cairo and Berlin, Hamzawy joined the Carnegie Endowment for International Peace in Washington, DC between 2005 and 2009 as a senior associate for Middle East politics. Between 2009 and 2010 he was the research director of the Middle East Center of the Carnegie Endowment in Beirut, Lebanon. In 2011, he joined the Department of Public Policy and Administration at the American University in Cairo, where he worked for approximately 5 years. He was a senior research fellow at Stanford University from 2017-2021. He is a senior fellow and the director of the Middle East Program at Carnegie Endowment for International Peace, where his research and writings focus on governance in the Middle East and North Africa, social vulnerability, and the different roles of governments and civil societies in the region.

His research and teaching interests as well as his academic publications focus on democratization processes in Egypt, tensions between freedom and repression in the Egyptian public space, political movements and civil society in Egypt, contemporary debates in Arab political thought, and human rights and governance in the Arab world.

Hamzawy is a former member of the People's Assembly after being elected in the first Parliamentary elections in Egypt after the Egyptian Revolution of 2011. He is also a former member of the Egyptian National Council for Human Rights. Hamzawy contributes a daily column and a weekly op-ed to the Egyptian independent newspaper Al Shorouk.

== Education ==
Hamzawy received his bachelor's degree from Cairo University in Egypt. After that, he received a master's degree from the University of Amsterdam, and another from the International Institute of Social Studies in The Hague. In 2002, he received his PhD from the Free University of Berlin.

== Political activism ==
Hamzawy used to work in the Middle East as a research director at the Carnegie Endowment for International Peace in Beirut. He played an important role in the 2011 Egyptian revolution and he was the spokesman of the "Board of Wise Men" set up during the revolution to offer negotiations and possible solutions to the protesters and the government. After the installation of Ahmed Shafik as Prime Minister, Hamzawy was offered the position of Minister of Youth. He declined the post. He has since become involved in the project for the establishment of a liberal party in Egypt. Hamzawy is a founding member of Freedom Egypt Party.

In 2012, Hamzawy was elected as a member of the Egyptian Parliament (constituency of Heliopolis, Badr City, Shorouk, Hikestep).

In 2013, he supported the campaign of the Tamarod movement for early presidential elections in Egypt. However, in the aftermath of the military coup that followed, he spoke out against the shutdown of Islamist satellite networks and the detention of President Morsi and other Islamist leaders, and objected in a newspaper column to "the rhetoric of gloating, hatred, retribution and revenge against the Muslim Brotherhood."

== Personal life ==
On 15 February 2012, Hamzawy married the Egyptian actress Basma Hassan at the Marriott Hotel in Cairo. They divorced in 2019.

== Selected writings ==
- A Margin for Democracy in Egypt - The Story of An Unsuccessful Transition (in Arabic) Cairo: The Egyptian Lebanese Publishers, 2014
- "On Religion, Politics, and Democratic Legitimacy in Egypt", Carnegie Middle East Center, Carnegie Endowment for International Peace (in English and Arabic), 2013
- "Remarks on Political Writing and its Role in Defending Democracy, Freedoms, and Human Rights" (in Arabic) Ahram: Journal of Democracy, 2013
- Between Religion and Politics, co-authored with Nathan J. Brown (political scientist)(in English and Arabic) Washington, D.C. and Beirut: Carnegie Endowment for International Peace, 2010, ISBN 978-0870032561
- The Arab Future: Debates on Democracy, Political Islam, and Resistance (in Arabic) Beirut: Dar an-Nahar, 2010
- Human Rights in the Arab World: Independent Voices (co-editor, in English) Pennsylvania: University of Pennsylvania Press, 2008, ISBN 978-0-8122-2032-2
- Contemporary Arab Political Thought: The Dialectics of Continuity and Change (in German) Hamburg: Schriften des Deutschen Orient-Instituts, 2005
- Religion, State, and Politics in the Near East: An Essay Collection In Memory of Prof. Dr. Friedemann Buettner (co-editor, in German) Muenster: Lit Verlag, 2003

== Publications ==
- Civil Society in the Middle East (book, 2003) ISBN 978-3899300277.
- Human Rights in the Arab World: Independent Voices, co-edited with Anthony Chase, in 2006 Zeitgenössisches Arabisches Denken: Kontinuität und Wandel, (Verlag des Deutschen Orient-Instituts, 2005) ISBN 978-0-8122-2032-2.
- "Arab spring fever" (essay) An article from: The National Interest with Nathan J. Brown (Oct 31, 2007).
- "Party for Justice and Development in Morocco: Participation and its Discontents", (Carnegie Paper, 2008).
- "Islamists in Politics: The Dynamics of Participation" (Carnegie Paper, 2008).
- "The Draft Party Platform of the Egyptian Muslim Brotherhood: Foray Into Political Integration or Retreat Into Old Positions?", with Nathan Brown (Carnegie Paper, 2008).
- "Between Government and Opposition: The Case of the Yemeni Congregation for Reform", (Carnegie Paper, 2009).
- Getting to Pluralism: Political Actors in the Arab World (book, co-written with Marina Ottaway, 2009) ISBN 978-0870032448.

== See also ==
- Asmaa Mahfouz
- George Ishak
- Ahmed Ghanem
- Wael Ghonim
- Hossam el-Hamalawy
- Mona Seif
