= Equality and Development Party =

Political party in Egypt

- House of Representatives: 0 / 568

The Equality and Development Party is a political party in Egypt. The party was started by Egyptian actress Tayseer Fahmy and her husband Dr. Ahmed Abou-bakr. Fahmy has stated that the party will work to achieve the goals of the revolution.

== Summary ==
The Equality and Development Party aims to achieve equality among all members of society. Specifically, the party seeks to ensure mutual understanding, tolerance and sharing amongst all members of Egyptian society irrespective of their religion, gender, race or economic status. Beyond assuring these fundamental rights throughout Egyptian society, the party aims to ensure the equal distribution of key services across the Egyptian classes with a primary focus on assuring access of all people to education and health care. In addition, the Equality and Development Party is committed to the ongoing development of employment opportunities in Egypt and sustains a fundamental commitment to assuring freedom of expression for all.

This party has been created as a direct result of the 25th of January Revolution. The party is committed to all of the principles outlined above while ensuring that the youth of the revolution, those who led calls for change in the country, lead Egypt toward a new era of freedom, democracy and prosperity. In so doing, the Equality and Development Party aims to help Egypt regain its leadership position on the world stage.

This party was founded on the basic principles outlined above with the ultimate goal of serving Egypt and her citizens—and to both listen to and honor their wishes.

The party supports the creation of a constitutional democracy, with an Islamic reference, that is able to achieve the dual aim of catering to the Muslim majority in Egypt while respecting and supporting the rights of other religions and belief systems. In so doing, the Equality and Development Party aims to stress solidarity and tolerance amongst all Egyptians so that the nation may come together as a whole to achieve critical development goals. We believe that it is only when the people of Egypt are united as a cohesive unit, with a concentrated focus on their future, that significant development may occur.

The party joined The Revolution Continues Alliance ahead of the 2011–12 Egyptian parliamentary election.

== Electoral history ==
=== People's Assembly elections ===
Election	Seats	+/–
2011–12 (as part of The Revolution Continues Alliance)	1 / 596	▲1
