= Nasser al-Hafi =

Egyptian lawyer and politician

Nasser al-Hafi (Arabic: ناصر الحافي; died 1 July 2015) was an Egyptian lawyer and politician.

== Biography ==
He was elected to the Egyptian parliament during the 2011–12 Egyptian parliamentary election for the Freedom and Justice Party.

In June 2015, Hafi was sentenced to death in absentia by an Egyptian court for a large-scale jailbreak in 2011.

On 1 July 2015, he was killed during a raid by Egyptian police in 6th of October City, a suburb of Cairo. The number of casualties during the raid was reported to be between 9 and 13. A spokesperson for the Muslim Brotherhood called the raid a "massacre". Egyptian security officials called the group "armed militants" while the Muslim Brotherhood spoke of a legal team.
