= Freedom Egypt Party =

Freedom Egypt Party حزب مصر الحرية
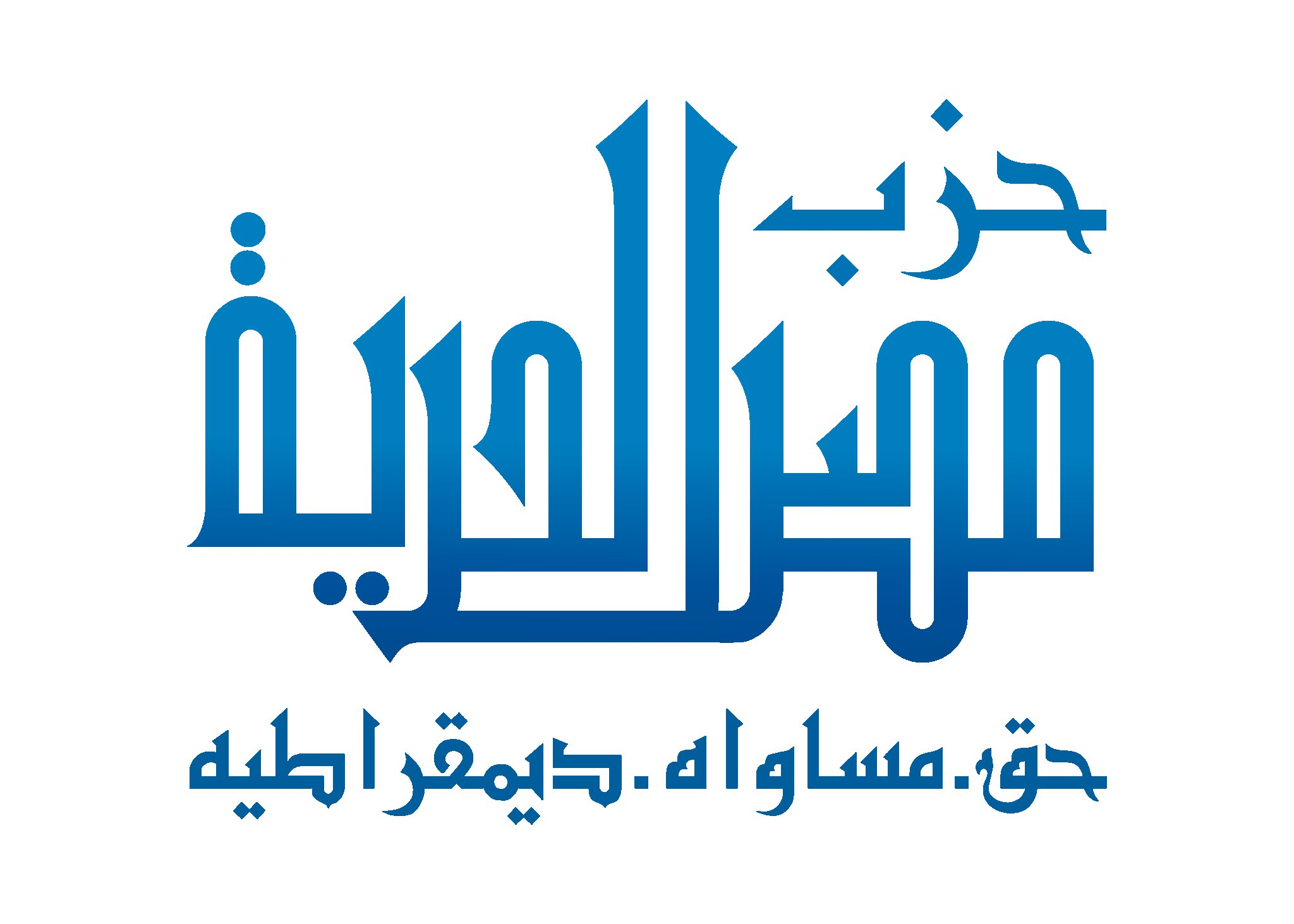
- Chairman: Amr Hamzawy
- Founded: 18 May 2011
- Headquarters: Cairo
- Ideology: Social democracy
- Political position: Centre-left
- National affiliation: Civil Democratic Movement
- Colours: Blue, White
- House of Representatives: 0 / 568

The Freedom Egypt Party (Arabic: حزب مصر الحرية; transliterated: Hizb Masr Alhureyya) is a political party in Egypt which was founded on 18 May 2011 by Amr Hamzawy and a group of Egyptian youth after the Egyptian Revolution of 2011.

== History ==
The party initially allied itself with the Egyptian Bloc ahead of the 2011–12 Egyptian parliamentary election, though it withdrew from the alliance in October 2011. It contested the election as part of The Revolution Continues Alliance.

== Electoral history ==
=== People's Assembly elections ===
Election	Seats	+/–
2011–12 (as part of The Revolution Continues Alliance)	1 / 596	▲1
