= Islamist Bloc =

Defunct Egyptian electoral alliance

The Islamist Bloc الكتلة الإسلامية
- Founded: 3 November 2011
- Ideology: Salafi Islamism; Factions: Wahhabism; Madkhalism; Religious conservatism Conservatism; Economic liberalism
- Political position: Center-right to far-right

The Islamist Bloc (Arabic: الكتلة الإسلامية), formally the Alliance for Egypt, was an electoral alliance of Egyptian political parties, formed for the 2011–12 Egyptian parliamentary election. It consisted of two Salafist parties, Al-Nour and Authenticity Party, as well as the Building and Development Party, which is the political wing of the Islamic Group (al-Gama'a al-Islamiyya).

== History ==
The Authenticity Party left the Democratic Alliance for Egypt in October 2011 over its share of electoral slots, while the Al-Nour Party had earlier departed from the alliance. A new Salafi alliance was formed between the Al-Nour Party and the Authenticity Party following their departures from the Democratic Alliance for Egypt, which the Islamist Building and Development Party also considering leaving. The Building and Development Party separated from the Democratic Alliance over its small share of seats, and the Islamist Bloc, formed by the three Islamist parties, was publicly announced on 3 November 2011.

In the 2011/2012 parliamentary elections, the Islamist Bloc won 7,534,266 votes out of 27,065,135 correct votes, or roughly 27.8% of all votes and received 96 seats out of 332 in the Egyptian parliament. The 96 seats were divided between members of the alliance as follows:

- Al-Nour Party: 83 seats
- Building and Development Party: 10 seats
- Authenticity Party: 3 seats

In addition, independent candidates of the Al-Nour Party won 28 seats out of the 168 seats allocated for independent candidates.

Additionally, three members of the Building and Development Party were elected as independents.

The Islamist Bloc won a total of 127 seats out of 498 (25.5%) in the 2012 Egyptian Parliament, becoming the second largest political bloc in the parliament after the Democratic Alliance for Egypt.

The alliance won 45 seats in the 2012 Egyptian Shura Council election.

== Electoral history ==
=== People's Assembly elections ===
Election	Seats	+/–
2011–12	123 / 596	▲123

=== Shura council elections ===
Election	Seats	+/–
2012	45 / 270	▲45

== Formerly affiliated parties ==
- Al-Nour Party
- Authenticity Party
- Building and Development Party
