= Tarek Shaker =

Egyptian politician

Tarek Makram Shaker is an Egyptian politician. A Coptic Christian, he has served as Vice President of the Egyptian House in the US, an organization claiming to represent the Egyptian community in the United States.

Tarek Shaker was appointed by SCAF to the People's Assembly of Egypt in January 2012. However, he has subsequently faced allegations that he is actually American, as well as being a twice-convicted criminal, and hence may not be eligible to sit in the parliament.
