= Talaat Sadat =

Egyptian politician (1954–2011)

- Born: 26 February 1954
- Died: 20 November 2011 (aged 57)
- Relatives: Mohamed Anwar Esmat Sadat (brother); Anwar Sadat (uncle)

Talaat Sadat (Arabic: طلعت عصمت السادات; 26 February 1954 – 20 November 2011) was an Egyptian politician, lawyer and former political prisoner. He was the nephew of former Egyptian president Anwar Sadat and the brother of Mohamed Anwar Esmat Sadat.

== Arrest ==
Talaat was arrested on 4 October 2006 after giving an interview in which he implicated Egyptian military forces in his uncle's 1981 assassination. His trial by military authorities ended on 31 October with a conviction for defaming the Egyptian armed forces, resulting in a one-year prison sentence. His arrest and conviction was criticized by the United States State Department.

== Political career ==
Following the Egyptian Revolution of 2011, even though he was in demonstrations calling for dissolution of the National Democratic Party for its corruption of Egyptian political life, he was selected as the party's new chairman following the resignation of former Egyptian president Hosni Mubarak from the party.

However, on 16 April 2011, the NDP was dissolved by the courts and its assets were ordered to be handed over to the government. Then he began to establish the National Party of Egypt shortly before his death.

== Death ==
He died on 20 November 2011 of a heart attack at the age of 57 at the National Commercial Bank hospital in Alqutamya.
