= Tawfik Okasha =

Egyptian television anchor

Tawfiq Okasha توفيق عكاشة
- Born: Tawfiq Yahya Ibrahim Okasha; 24 January 1967 (age 59); Nabaruh, Dakahlia Governorate, Egypt
- Years active: 1990–present
- Political party: National Democratic Party (until 2011); National Party

Tawfiq Okasha (Arabic: توفيق عكاشة), is an Egyptian television presenter as owner and principal anchor of the satellite political-commentary channel Faraeen (also Al Fara'een) until it was folded in 2016. He has been called an opponent of Egyptian liberals and revolutionary youth activists, and until late June 2012 was considered "a staunch supporter" of Egypt's ruling military council (SCAF).

== Biography ==
Following Egypt's 2012 presidential election Okasha claimed that the United States government and Egypt's ruling military council had rigged the election in favor of the Muslim Brotherhood candidate Mohammed Morsi as part of a plot to seize Egyptian oil fields and turn them over to Israel, and that the true winner of the election was Ahmed Shafik, a former general who was Hosni Mubarak's last prime minister. The claim was called "wildly counterintuitive" as both the United States and ruling military are enemies of the Brotherhood, and members of the council appeared on television to deny the report. The claim was seen as fueling a 15 July 2012 attack of tomatoes and shoes by Egyptian Copt protestors on the motorcade of the visiting US Secretary of State

A former member of parliament for the former ruling National Democratic Party, Okasha has also been called "Egypt's Glenn Beck" (after the right-wing American television host) for his "embrace of conspiratorial thinking and hatred of political Islam". In March 2012, he was found guilty of defamation and libel in lawsuit filed against him for insulting the mother of Egyptian torture victim Khaled Saeed and sentenced in absentia.

On his channel, Okasha co-hosts a popular TV show called "Egypt Today". According to Egypt Independent, "Okasha claims that "Egypt Today" was watched by more than 300 million viewers throughout the Arab world, a figure impossible to verify". Okasha's political opponents accused him of using the show to "spread lies and fantasy" about them. In July 2012, a court ordered Al-Faraeen to be shut down for 45 days.

On 22 October 2012, Okasha was convicted of insulting President Mohamed Morsi and sentenced to a four-month jail term and a fine of 100 Egyptian pounds (US$16.39). Okasha remained free while appealing the sentence. Amnesty International protested the conviction, calling it "a further blow to freedom of expression" and noting that the organization would consider Okasha a prisoner of conscience were he imprisoned on this basis.

He won a seat in the parliament following the 2015 parliamentary election. However, he was expelled in early 2016, as he had invited the Israeli ambassador Haim Koren for dinner at his home in Dakahlia Governorate.

In 2017, he was sentenced for a one year in prison for forging his PhD certificate from an alleged U.S. university to enter the parliament. Later on, he went to work for "Al-Hayat TV" in 2018.

== See also ==
- Politics of Egypt
- Egyptian presidential election, 2012
