= Coalition of the Youth of the Revolution =

The Coalition of the Youth of the Revolution was a coalition of organisations of young people involved in the Egyptian Revolution of 2011. The group disbanded on 7 July 2012 after Egypt's transitional period had ended.

== Members ==
Members included:

- The April 6 Youth Movement
- A youth organisation of the Muslim Brotherhood
- Supporters of Mohamed ElBaradei, a leading figure of the opposition movement,

== Activity ==
The group organized post-revolution events of the 2011 Egyptian revolution and met with the Supreme Council of the Armed Forces to negotiate demands including the resignation of the Minister of Interior, the restoration of a fair minimum wage, the end of Emergency Law and term limits for the president.
