= Abdel Ahad Gamal El Din =

Egyptian politician and academic

Abdel Ahad Gamal El-Din is an Egyptian academic and politician.

== Career ==
He is a member of the Pan-African Parliament from Egypt. He is also Chairman of the Committee on International Humanitarian Law in the People's Assembly, former chairman of Supreme Council For Youth, and a professor at Future University in Egypt.
