= Kamal Abbas =

Egyptian activist and trade unionist

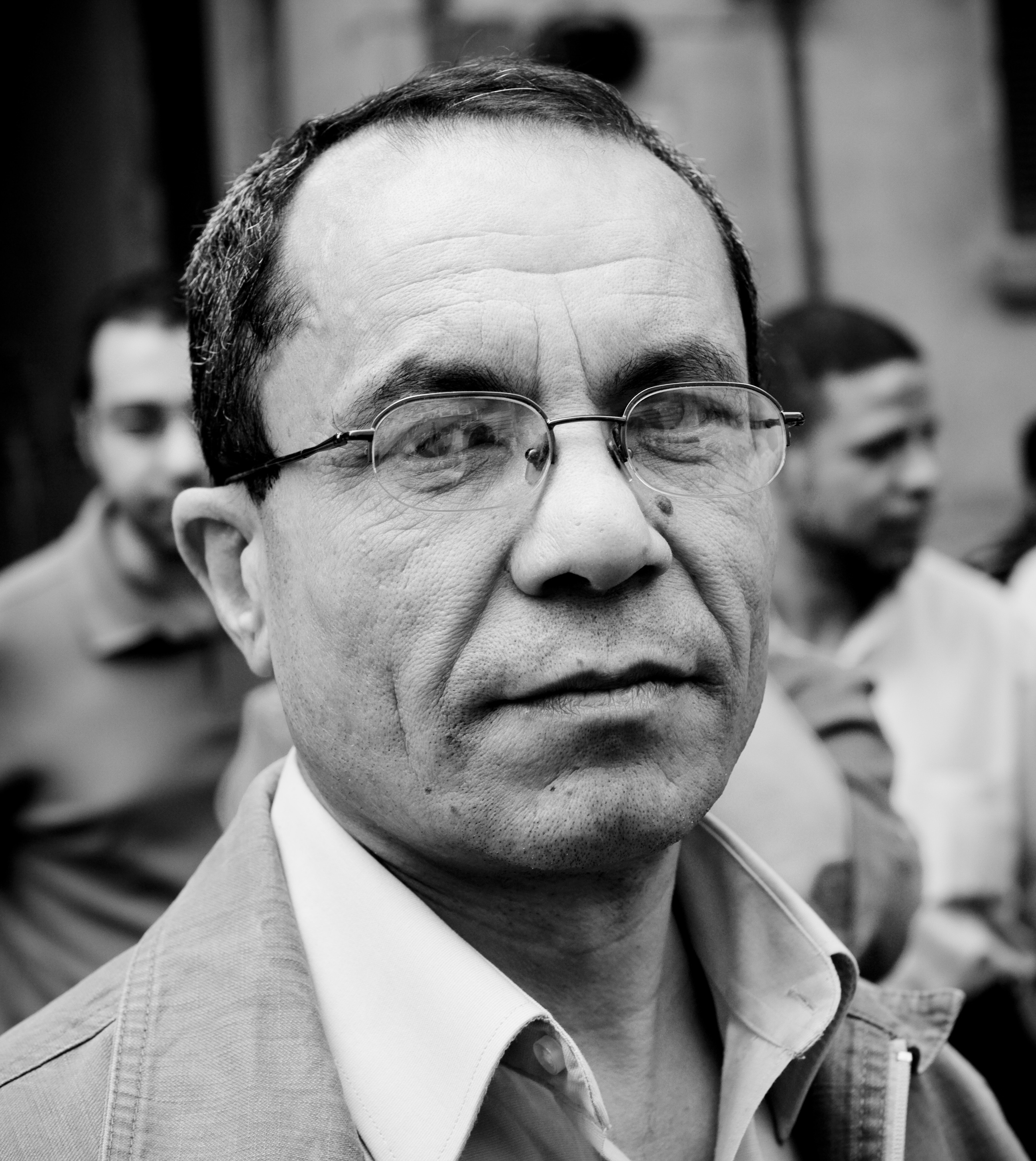
- Kamal Abbas
- Born: كمال عباس; 1955 (age 70–71); Egypt
- Known for: Co-founding CTUWS, activism in the 2011 Egyptian revolution, organizer of strikes, advocacy for workers' rights
- Political party: Workers Democratic Party

Kamal Abbas (Egyptian Arabic: كمال عباس; born in 1955) is General Coordinator of the Center for Trade Unions and Workers Services (CTUWS), an activist group for independent unions in Egypt. Involved in activism for over 20 years, Abbas has been active in mobilizing worker support during the Egyptian Revolution of 2011 and its aftermath. His approach emphasizes peaceful strikes and rallies accompanied by demands for better wages and working conditions, as well as more regular elections for union officials, and an independent union system.

He began his work by organizing a strike at a steel plant in Helwan, Egypt in 1989, for which he was arrested, tortured, and fired. That incident led to his starting the CTUWS and advocating for workers' rights throughout Egypt. Abbas' relationship with Mubarak's regime was tense and marked by conflicts with the government and multiple arrests. The Los Angeles Times called Abbas "a major annoyance" to President Hosni Mubarak's regime, and "passionate, methodical and accustomed to police surveillance."

In 2007, Abbas was charged with defamation and sentenced to one year of prison. There was international condemnation of the ruling, with major labor and human rights groups defending Abbas.

Abbas' work gained momentum and attention during the 2011 Egyptian revolution, where he helped mobilize workers in the nationwide movement for civil rights and the overthrow of Hosni Mubarak's regime.

In February 2012 he was once again sentenced to a prison term, this time six months for "insulting" a public official.

== 1989–1990: Early work and founding of CTUWS ==
Abbas began working in a steel mill in 1975 at the age of 20. While under the Mubarak regime, Abbas began organizing workers, despite unions being dominated by the state-approved Egyptian Trade Union Federation (ETUF). In 1989 he participated in a strike at the Iron and Steel Company plant in Helwan where 19,000 workers sought wage increases and a meal during work. They were met by 10,000 riot police who fired rubber bullets and tear gas at the striking workers; ultimately the strike was broken up when security forces stormed the plant, resulting on one death, one hundred injuries and hundreds of arrests.

Abbas was arrested four times in the subsequent months, including 45 days of detention in which he was tortured. Following, he was terminated for participating in an "illegal" strike not sanctioned by the official trade union.

Several months later in 1990, Abbas co-founded CTUWS in Helwan to support workers and address the lack of independent unions in the private sector. He was guided by the advice of Yusuf Darwish, a long-time communist and labor lawyer, with whom Abbas had previously led the People's Socialist Party. Abbas had studied world labor movements, looking up to the power of unions in Europe and the Solidarity movement in Poland in the 1980s. Abbas changed his ideological focus from his early ties to Marxist politics, instead focusing CTUWS on practical reform.

== 1990–2007: Work with CTUWS ==
Abbas' relationship with Mubarak's regime was tense and marked by conflicts with the government and multiple arrests.

In 1998 Abbas commented on the July strikes at the Egypt-Helwan Textiles Factory and the Nasr Pharmaceutical plant. Abbas saw the incidents as a test of the future of privatisation. He said, "People can now see that there is a choice, that they can say no."

In 1999 he spoke out on the need for education and training for workers. He said, "In Korea, development was based on a comprehensive educational policy. We still do not see this happening here. Even in the new factories, production lines are imported with a foreign expert to run them. They are assembly plants and the Egyptian worker does not have to be very skilled. The Egyptian worker does not gain the kind of knowledge that can make him an interactive part of the production process."

In the 2000 Parliamentary elections, Abbas nominated himself as an independent labor representative for Helwan. Abbas said that his General Union for Mineral, Electrical, and Engineering Industries at first refused to grant him status as a labor representative. According to Abbas, he received it, "Following a long and exhausting struggle with the general union council." He also criticized the candidacy of Minister Sayed Mash'al and supported Safir Nigm for minister of military production in the Helwan area. Abbas argued, "After Mash'al took over, there was a massive explosion at one of the factories. Five workers died and compensation was inadequate. When workers complained, [Mash'al] had dozens of them sent to jail."

In 2001 Abbas commented on the increasing privatisation of employment and the role of professional committees. He said, "Approximately 50 per cent of the number of trade union members who make up the current trade union structure belong to and vote for 'professional committees.'" Drivers in the Helwan district, Abbas said, are members of a professional committee, as are the construction workers in Shubra. "These are committees that have few functions. For example, a driver will only go to his union when getting his licence because he needs their signature. We cannot consider these committees or their members active components of the trade union structure or the working class." He noted the changing nature of political alliances regarding unions: "And this time around, the left has changed its election programme from calling for the protection of the public sector to focusing on the protection of workers' rights, irrespective of who the management is."

In 2002 a Unified Labour Law came up for parliamentary debate to replace labour law 137, passed in 1981. Abbas criticized exclusions in the bill which left out government administration, domestic work, workers' families, short-term workers (less than six months), principal management, and self-employed workers, and "pure" agricultural work when done by women and minors.

In 2003 Abbas began seeking formal registration in line with Article 11 of Law 84/2002, which deals with NGO registration, security and public order. Abbas was critical of the registration procedures: "The law is bad and it is designed to co-opt you under government control. And there has been heavy government pressure. But we decided to try and open negotiations with them. After all, in Egypt you never know what is going to happen—things could get even worse tomorrow." Abbas fought attempts to exclude the words "worker" and "trade union" from the organization name or scope. "They wanted us to change our name, but we won't, it's internationally recognized. They said the name breaches Article 11. We said no, Article 11 has to do with your goals...They said that our work could breach article 11. 'Your problem is that you speak for workers in disputes, and this we can not allow. There are government agencies and organizations that already do this, and you cannot have face to face meetings [on these issues].'"

In 2005 Abbas was critical of how workers' rights were being addressed in the political dialogue. He said, "Unfortunately, the labour movement's democratic demands are absent from the agenda of change called for by the opposition. Even the political parties that are close to workers' circles—such as the Tagammu and Nasserist parties—are only interested now in the laws that regulate political participation and professional syndicates." He told the Egyptian newspaper Al-Ahram, "Political movements that once upheld the interests of the working class based themselves on public sector workers, most of whom have been liquidated through early retirement schemes...the current environment where workers see people taking on the state and putting up a fight has created a situation in which we can see renewed labour activism of the sort now taking place...I do not think that such a movement would have been possible if it were not for the current movement for political reform."

In 2005 Abbas criticized the negotiations in the Esco workers' protest. He noted that clause 69 of the labor contract, which stipulated workers could be fired if they fail to perform "essential duties", was broad enough to permit random firings. Abbas also criticized requirements that protests be approved by the General Federation of Trade Unions (GFTU). He said, "Workers go on strike to improve their material conditions. They are not staging a play. They are not rehearsing for some media circus. And they should not be forced to strike within the straitjacket of a preset timetable. This defeats the purpose of the strike because it limits the workers' bargaining power."

In June 2005 Abbas commented on legal issues dealing with the Al-Amrya Weaving and Textile Company. He said, "The distinction between public and private sector workers will in any case become irrelevant, sooner or later, given that the entire public sector is on the block. What is important in this case is that the Unified Labour Law (12) of 2003 doesn't differentiate between private and public sector workers. Misr Al-Amrya cannot legally argue on the basis of state workers' rights to base salary increments versus private sector workers' non-rights. Which is why, in the end, the company did eventually comply."

In July 2005 Abbas was attacked by plain-clothes Egyptian security forces while demonstrating against human rights abuses by the Mubarak regime. He was badly wounded.

In 2005 Abbas also criticized the Muslim Brotherhood for being two-faced in their approach to civil rights. "Egypt has never had democracy. For now the Brotherhood stands for civil rights, but its basic stance is against them. It has one language for the media and another for its followers."

In November 2006 Abbas dismissed the significance of General Federation of Trade Unions (GFTU) elections, arguing that public sector industrial workers overseen by the GFTU were increasingly few. He recommended switching focus to ununionized private sector workers: "The minister of investment has openly stated that except for four companies the little that remains of the industrial public sector is for sale...the real battle is to fight for trade union pluralism, to build a new and independent trade union structure."

== 2007–2010: CTUWS closure, lawsuit, and prison sentence ==
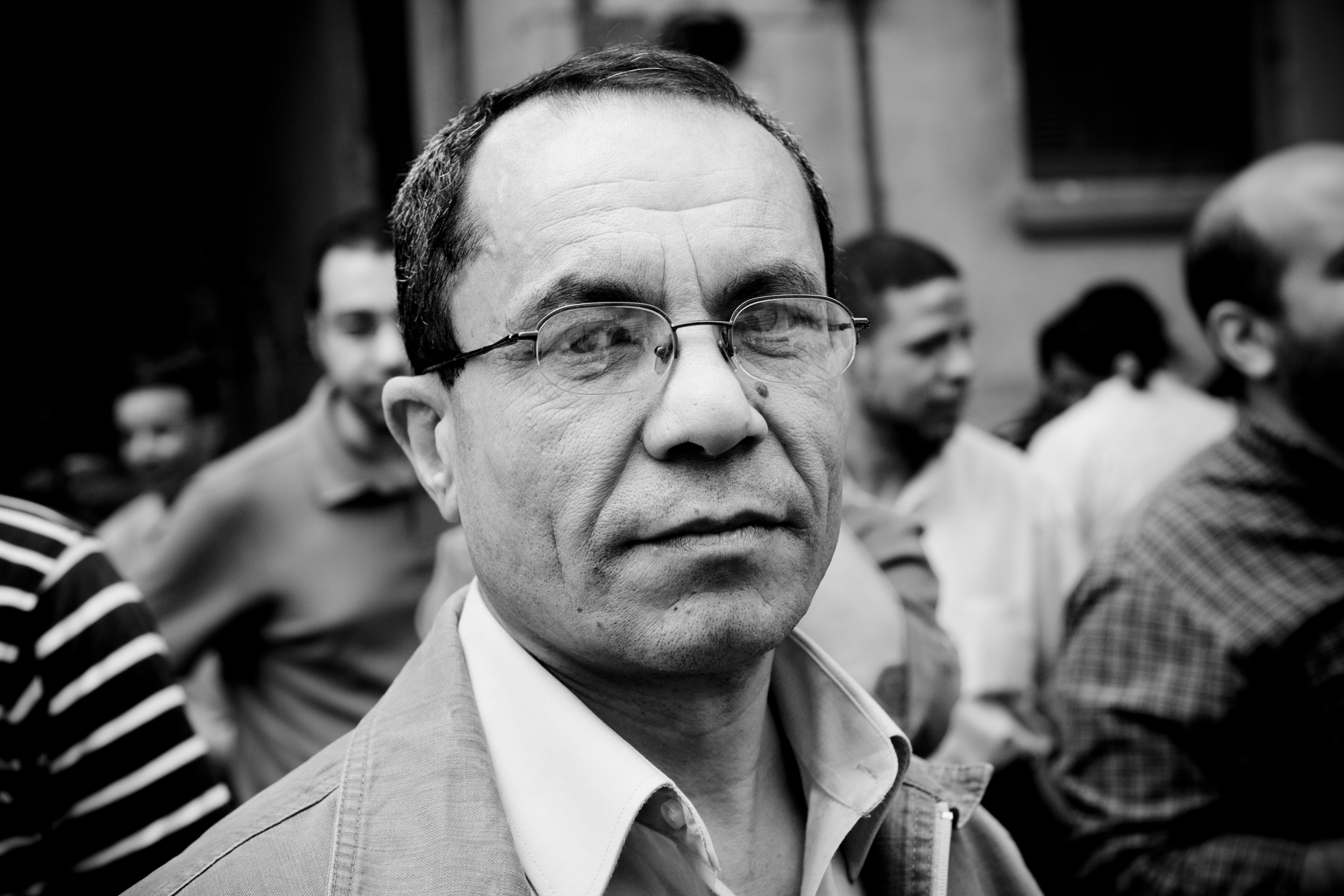
Kamal Abbas during the 2010 National Minimum Wage protest

In November 2007 Abass criticized the government sale of companies to international investors, arguing the transactions led to workers losing their jobs.

In 2007 he criticized the state of politics, calling the regime illegitimate, and saying that Egypt is "a suffering society with no way to express itself." He speculated that poverty in Cairo could lead to a violent confrontation with the police. Abbas envisioned a charismatic opposition leader who could rise up amidst the tension, but he did not believe such an individual would be part of the labor movement. He said, "Those who think the labor movement will lead to political change in Egypt are foolish. The movement is still too young. We have to be concerned with the economic conditions of the workers. We can't rush things."

In April 2007 Abbas' CTUWS office was shut down and he was accused of working with "external forces" in order to disrupt the country's economy. The government closed CTUWS' Helwan headquarters and two other branches in Nag' Hamadi and Mehala Al-Kobra for "security reasons".

In September 2007 Abbas and another writer were convicted of defamation and public abuse after writer Mohamed Helmy published an article on corruption at the 15th of May Youth Center, where Abbas was a member of the board. The story was published in Kalam Sanay'iya, a magazine published by the CTUWS. The lawsuit for alleged "slander and defamation of character" against Abbas—and his co-defendant lawyer Mohamed Helmi—was filed by Mohamed Mustafa Ibrahim, chairman of the board of directors at the youth center. Ibrahim filed three petitions against Abbas and claimed that the magazine article "publicly defamed him as a state-appointed civil servant". He based his case on Article 188 of the Egyptian code of law, which penalizes false reporting (anyone who "publishes false news, statements or rumours likely to disturb public order" may face a prison sentence). Abbas was sentenced to one year in prison.

About the incident, Abbas commented to National Public Radio, "The government is also very sensitive about any links between political powers in Egypt and the labor movement because this would mean that workers might enter with their weight into the democratic movement. They're very scared of this."

"It is clear the judge's decision to give me a one-year jail sentence is political...It is no coincidence that I was sentenced at about the same time as the journalists and editors," Abbas told Ahram Weekly. "The court had regularly adjourned the case since May, deciding to issue a ruling only on 21 September. Prosecuting and sentencing journalists for publishing offences is all part of the government's general crack-down on civil liberties. The government feels threatened by the strikes, especially actions taken by the militant Mehala Al-Kubra textile workers whose latest strike was settled last week. They need a scapegoat for their failed policies. This is why they closed down our offices, refuse to license us and continue to accuse the CTUWS of inciting the strikes. The allegations are flattering but untrue. How could we possibly have incited the tens of thousands of workers who have gone on strike since December?" he said.

CTUWS criticized the conviction. "What does it mean when courts seek to imprison citizens, who publish the facts about corruption cases? The allegations against Ibrahim were found to be true and were the basis for the legal decision... Does it mean that the courts are offering immunity to corrupt officials, that they are offering protection against any criticism or disclosure?"

International labor and human rights groups came out in support of Abbas and condemned the court decision. The International Trade Unions Confederation (ITUC), accused the Mubarak regime of going after opposition groups and media. "We are very concerned about this latest attack on the CTUWS. We are particularly concerned that these prison sentences follow a long tradition of repression of the CTUWS, an independent civil society organization committed to defending trade union and workers rights in Egypt," said Guy Ryder, ITUC general secretary. A coalition of the Italian trade unions sent a letter to Mubarak asking him to "ensure that CTUWS is not persecuted and demanding that "this particular case could be reviewed. The Euro-Mediterranean Human Rights Network also issued a statement "expressing its deep concern over the case.

Egyptian labour historian Joel Beinin said, "The attack on CTUWS is part of the intensification of the assault of the Mubarak regime against its opponents". Faiza Rady considered the prison sentence an attack on the defence of workers' rights.

After Abbas' and Helmy's September conviction, an investigation by the Governor of Cairo found the charges of corruption at the youth center to be true. Cairo Governor Abdel Azim Wazir ordered the entire board of the center to be disbanded.

Abbas appealed his conviction at a 29 Dec. hearing. He and Helmy remained free between the case and the appeal.

In 2009 Human Rights Watch noted a significant increase "in the harassment of human rights activists at Cairo airport", which included the detainment of Abbas.

In 2010 the Egyptian Minister of Planning created a committee regarding minimum wage, which Abbas criticized for not acting. Abbas supported working with the new committee's goals, which included a minimum annual salary increase of seven per cent. He also criticized the labour complaints committee for not meeting regularly.

In 2010 Abbas criticized proposals to postpone trade union elections. Abbas criticized the role of the ETUF as "a governmental institution, not a federation of genuine trade unions. Nor does it represent Egypt's workers in any way." Abbas also noted the practice of elected officials busing in members of their constituency to vote.

In May 2010 Abbas criticized the forced end of a protest in Cairo by workers from Amonsito, the Egyptian Telephone Company and el-Nubaria Agricultural Engineering, who had been protesting for several months. Abbas had said he would submit a complaint to the International Labour Organization about the incident.

In August 2010 Abbas criticized the constitutionality of military courts being used on civilians working in military production facilities.

Also in August Abbas criticized ETUF head Megawer of being an appointed labor representative in positions that are mandated to be elected. Abbas also criticized Megawer's affiliation with the National Democratic Party (NDP), suggesting that the ETUF should not be determining eligibility for parliamentary elections. Abbas argued, "The ETUF has actually granted a number of businessmen and retired officers, from the ruling party, the status of labor representatives when they are not laborers in any way shape or form."

== 2011–present: Egyptian revolution ==
External videos
- The role of Independent Unions in Egypt's Revolution on YouTube
- Egyptian Unions in Solidarity With Wisconsin Workers on YouTube

During the revolution, Abbas made an appeal for new trade unions at Tahrir Square. He said, “On January 30th we met with representative of other independent trade union organizations and we discussed forming a new federation. We then made an announcement in Tahrir square, calling for a new federation. But at the time we had no idea what would happen. Since then this call has been responded to by the workers. The challenge now that the revolution has succeeded is to be able to build a society of social justice.”

In February 2011 Abbas criticized the elections in federation syndicates for being corrupt with fraud. He said, "There are 116 verdicts of administrative court annulling the last union elections and we believe members of the federation were involved in acts of violence against the protesters in Tahrir". Abbas recommended creating independent syndicates, saying, "We will do as our grandfathers did before 1952 when the first unions were created in Egypt".

Also in February, Abbas supported strikes motivated by "how many billions the Mubarak family was worth."

In May 2011 Abbas celebrated International Workers' Day (also known as "May Day"), the international socialist commemoration of workers' rights reform begun in the United States. Abbas deemed that year's celebrations "historic" for marking a break from the ETUF. Abbas also praised the then newly formed Egyptian Federation of Independent Trade Unions (EITUF). May Day celebrations focused on the free will of Egyptian workers to form independent trade unions, free from state control, and the dismantling of the ETUF.

In June 2011, Abbas was co-filer of a lawsuit calling for the dissolution of the state-controlled ETUF. The suit called for "sequestration of the ETUF headquarters, buildings, its Workers' University, cultural institute, hospitals and clinics" as well as "barring the ETUF from representing Egypt's workers or unions at international conferences".

Abbas interrupted the ETUF's Ismail Fahmy during his speech at the International Labour Organization (ILO) June 2011 conference. Abbas criticized the ETUF saying, "Enough ... all these years ... and crimes enough! ... Enough you killers! ... You participated in the passage of the privatization deals, and facilitated and justified the blatant attacks on the rights of workers ... You defended with impunity Mubarak's regime with its corruption, repression and tyranny, and then you plotted against the killing of the revolutionaries in Tahrir Square!"

During the 2011 revolution Abbas made a video from Tahrir Square telling American workers who were on strike in Wisconsin:

"From this place, I want you to know that we stand with you as you stood with us. I want you to know that no power can challenge the will of the people when they believe in their rights. When they raise their voices loud and clear and struggle against exploitation. No one believed that our revolution could succeed against the strongest dictatorship in the region. But in 18 days the revolution achieved the victory of the people….We want you to know that we stand on your side. Stand firm and don’t waiver. Don’t give up on your rights. Victory always belongs to the people who stand firm and demand their just rights. We and all the people of the world stand on your side and give you our full support. As our just struggle for freedom, democracy and justice succeeded, your struggle will succeed. Victory belongs to you when you stand firm and remain steadfast in demanding your just rights."

In March 2011, Abbas participated in a labour panel discussing the future of trade unions following the fall of Mubarak's regime. At the end of the panel, Abbas declared, "the regime has fallen...the Egyptian Federation of Trade Unions has fallen! What more do you want? Go create your own unions!"

On 29 February 2012, the CTUWS reported that Abbas had been sentenced in absentia to six months in prison for "insulting" a public official.

== See also ==
- Sameh Naguib
- Kamal Khalil
