= Coalition of Socialist Forces =

Coalition of Socialist Forces تحالف القوى الاشتراكية
- Founded: 10 May 2011
- Headquarters: Egypt
- Ideology: Socialism; Secularism; Factions: Communism; Marxism–Leninism; Anti-Zionism; Trotskyism; Nasserism
- Political position: Left-wing to far-left

The Coalition of Socialist Forces (CSF; Arabic: تحالف القوى الاشتراكية, romanized: Taḥāluf al-Quwá al-Ishtirākīyah) was a coalition of five socialist and left-wing groups in Egypt formed on 10 May 2011. The different forces agreed to enter into a "socialist front" in order "to create a more dominant leftist force" in post-revolutionary Egypt. As of 31 May 2011, the CSF was reported to have a combined membership of over 5,000 members.

== Affiliate groups ==
- Egyptian Communist Party - Marxist-Leninist
- Socialist Popular Alliance Party - Democratic socialist
- Revolutionary Socialists - Trotskyist
- Socialist Party of Egypt - Democratic socialist
- Workers Democratic Party - Labourist

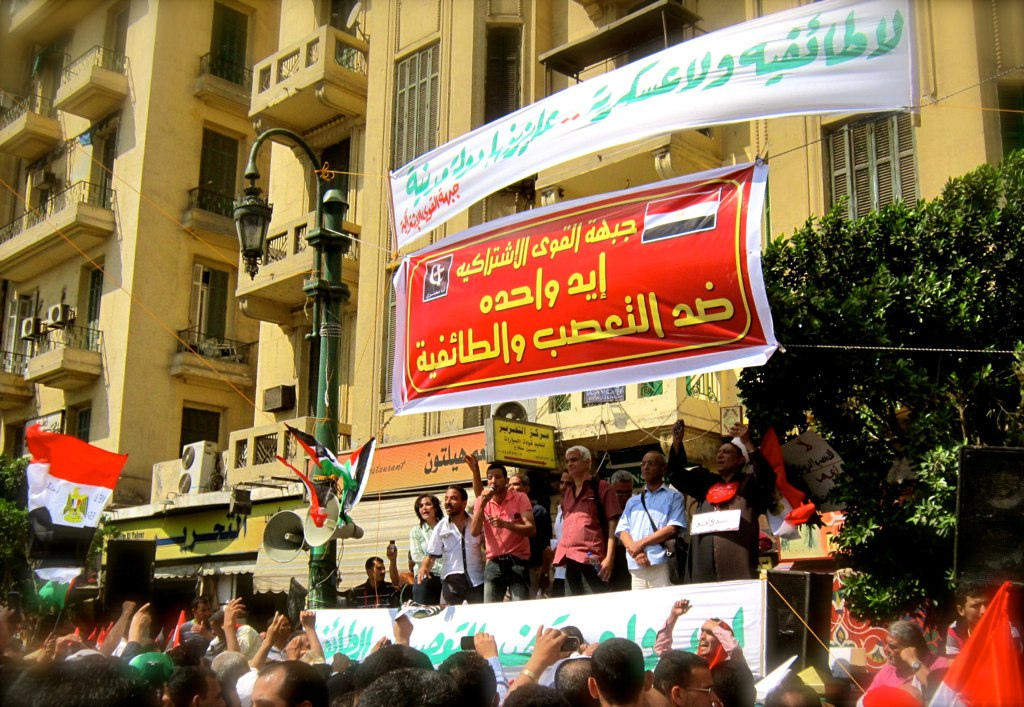
Meeting of Coalition of Socialist Forces, 12 May 2011

== See also ==
- Popular front
- United front
