= AbdelRahman Mansour =

Egyptian internet activist and journalist (born 1987)

AbdelRahman Mansour عبد الرحمن منصور
- Born: 1987 (age 38–39); Mansoura, Egypt
- Education: Mansoura University (Bachelor of Arts, Journalism Dept.)
- Occupations: Visiting scholar, College of Education
- Years active: 2009–present
- Employer: University of Illinois

AbdelRahman Mansour (Arabic: عبد الرحمن منصور; born in 1987) is an internet activist, journalist and human rights defender. In 2011, he came up with the idea of turning Egypt's National Police Day on 25 January into a Facebook event, "Revolution of the Egyptian People", sparking the online campaign for pro-democracy demonstrations that later snowballed into a popular uprising.

About to start his compulsory military service in early January 2011, just before 25 January revolution, Mansour remained anonymous without announcing his role as the underground Cairo-based administrator of the Facebook page "We are all Khaled Saeed", the main online tool that mobilized the initial mass protests against torture and police brutality, and which culminated weeks later in the ouster of Egyptian strongman Hosni Mubarak, who had ruled the country for the previous three decades. Wael Ghonim, who was living abroad at the time, was the page's publicly known administrator.

== Background ==
AbdelRahman was born to a middle-class family in 1987 in Mansoura, Egypt. He earned a Bachelor of Arts in journalism and broadcasting from Mansoura University in 2010. After his graduation and immediate conscription, he traveled to the United States in late 2013 to continue his academic studies.

== Career ==
He first became politically active in 2005, joining the protest movement Kefaya to demand political reforms in Egypt, and later participated in student movements across several Egyptian universities. Since then, he has been active in raising awareness among Arab audiences on the importance of political activism, citizen movements and broadcasting.

AbdelRahman became an active blogger with "Kolena Laila (We are all Layla)", a feminist initiative that provided Arab women with an electronic platform to counter conservative voices in mainstream social media. He worked to expand the platform, introducing it in Morocco and Saudi Arabia.

In 2009, he began collaborating with Wael Ghonim to moderate and manage the online page of Mohamed Elbaradei, who had returned to Egypt the same year. After the tragic death of Khalid Saeed, the two online activists started the Facebook page "We Are All Khaled Saeed".

== Involvement in the Egyptian Revolution of 2011 ==
In 2010, AbdelRahman and Wael Ghonim founded the Facebook page, "We Are All Khaled Saeed", to commemorate the death of Khaled Saeed, a young Egyptian who was tortured to death by police in Alexandria in the same year. They utilized the page, with up to 3,000,000 followers, to mobilize for antigovernmental and anti-torture protests on 25 January. On 14 January, AbdelRahman conducted a survey on the page to test the waters, asking members if they would follow in the footsteps of Tunisians and take to the streets on 25 January. Enough enthusiasm poured prompting him and Wael to generate an online event entitled: 25 يناير ثورة على التعذيب والفساد والظلم والبطالة (January 25: Revolution against Torture, Corruption, Unemployment and Injustice). This first call to protests was soon picked up by many other activists. Both AbdelRahman and Wael collaborated anonymously with other activists on-the-ground to plan the locations for the protests.

The page was also influential in organizing innovative activities such as the Silent Stands and the Police Communication Campaign.

In the aftermath of the Arab Spring uprising in Egypt, AbdelRahman criticized the country's Islamists for their misrule; mainly "marginalizing other political forces" and sidelining youth groups. He also criticized young activists, or revolutionaries, for their lack of political engagement and failing to develop a political platform that builds on their protest demands.

== See also ==
- Wael Ghonim
- April 6 Youth Movement
- Asmaa Mahfouz
- Death of Khaled Mohamed Saeed
- Wael Abbas
- George Ishak
- Ahmed Ghanem
- Mohamed Soliman
- Hossam el-Hamalawy
