= Workers Democratic Party =

Political party in Egypt

Workers Democratic Party حزب العمال الديمقراطي
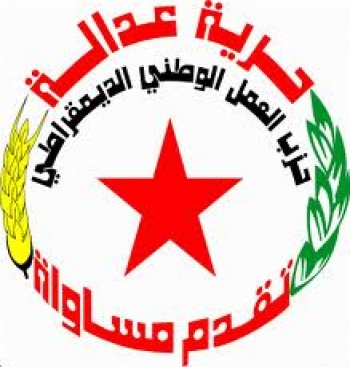
- Founded: 2011; 15 years ago
- Ideology: Labourism; Socialism; Anti-Zionism
- Political position: Left-wing
- National affiliation: Federation of Egyptian Trade Unions; Revolutionary Democratic Coalition
- House of Representatives: 0 / 568

The Workers National Democratic Party (WDP) (Arabic: حزب العمال الديمقراطي) is a workers' political party in Egypt formed shortly after the Egyptian Revolution of 2011. It is backed by the Federation of Egyptian Trade Unions and forms part of the Coalition of Socialist Forces. The party name is sometimes translated in English as Democratic Workers Party, Democratic Labour Party or Labour Democratic Party.

== History ==
The party was initiated by the leftist front Hashd and the Revolutionary Socialists (RS) in response to the country's growing strike movement which preceded the revolution. WDP spokesperson Kamal Khalil says "Most leftist attempts to form a party include intellectuals as major players and a number of workers as members... This party aims at having workers as the main players and leaders of the party joined by a number of intellectuals."

== Politics ==
Although the RS have been instrumental in the formation of the party, the WDP does not present itself as a revolutionary party. Party officials claim socialist revolution "is not feasible in the current political environment", citing the Egyptian working class' "lack of political experience and the underdevelopment of the labour movement". They instead advocate the re-nationalization of industry and more genuine worker democracy. Although not a self-proclaimed revolutionary party, the WDP cites revolutionary language and theory. For example, on May Day, 2011 - the first May Day after Mubarak - the party chanted "A workers' revolution against the capitalist government" while marching to Tahrir Square. The same day, Hossam el-Hamalawy, a representative of the party, called for "a complete halt to the neoliberal program." And Ahmed Ezzat, one of the founders of the WDP has admitted "Lenin's What is to be Done and April Notes helped shape our strategy, as did Marx's theories". Ezzat has also labeled the Muslim Brotherhood "counter-revolutionaries".

On 10 May 2011, the WDP agreed to enter into a "socialist front" with four other Egyptian leftist groups called the Coalition of Socialist Forces. The new grouping includes the Revolutionary Socialists, the Egyptian Communist Party, The Socialist Party of Egypt and the Popular Democratic Alliance Party.

== Demands ==
The party's most important principles are "the respect of all Egyptians' religious beliefs and bringing an end to discrimination on the basis of religion, color or sex." The re-nationalization of industry is one of the WDP's key demands but unlike under Gamal Abdel Nasser, where the heads of state-owned factories were appointed by the President, the WDP calls on workers of these factories to appoint their own managers. The WDP stands for abolishing privatization and monopoly policies, and redirecting development plans to benefit "underserved social classes". The party is also coordinating with other forces to establish a higher minimum wage for Egyptian workers, the establishment of trade unions independent of the state, and to improve working conditions in all workplaces. They are also calling for "combating administrative corruption and reevaluating Egypt’s economic ties to Israel". Their slogan is "the workers must be united".

== Legality ==
Under the current Political Parties Law, the WDP may not acquire official recognition, due to the law banning parties forming on a class basis. Also, party leaders are required to raise at least E£1 million to publish the names of at least 5,000 founders in two widely circulated dailies. The WDP sees this as the Supreme Council of the Armed Forces way of discriminating against the poor and labour movement: "This shows that the old mentality is still there and that the government is siding with businessmen rather than workers." The WDP is expected to defy the legislation and launch their party as soon as they recruit at least 10,000 workers and 10,000 farmers.

== See also ==
- Workers' council
- Vanguard party
