= Hossam el-Hamalawy =

Egyptian journalist (born 1977)

- حسام الحملاوى
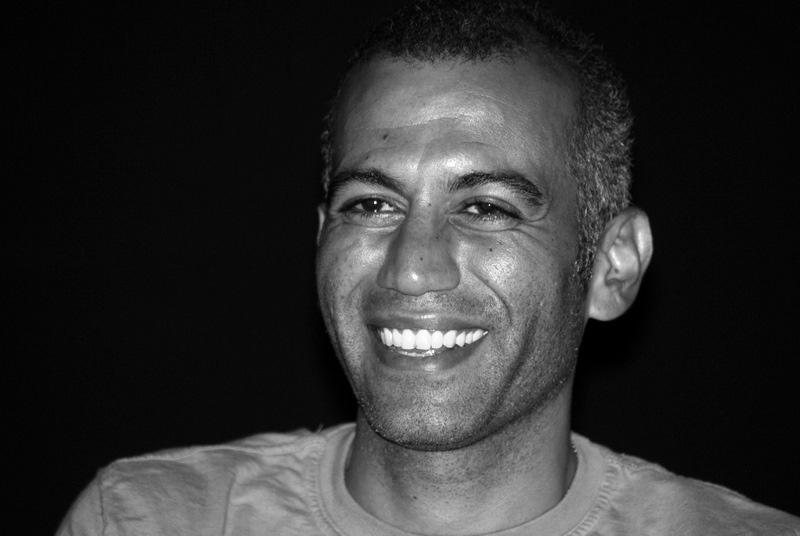
- Born: 14 July 1977 (age 49); Egypt
- Education: American University in Cairo
- Political party: Revolutionary Socialists
- Parent(s): Mohamed Rashad el-Hamalawy and Magda

Hossam el-Hamalawy (Arabic: حسام الحملاوى, IPA: [ħoˈsæːm elħæmæˈlæːwi]; AKA 3arabawy عرباوى, [ʕɑɾˤɑˈbɑːwi]; born 14 July 1977) is an Egyptian journalist, blogger, photographer and socialist activist. He is a member of the Trotskyist Revolutionary Socialists and the Center for Socialist Studies.

== Early life and career ==
El-Hamalawy started working as a journalist in 2002 for the English language Cairo Times, where he covered protests, trials of dissidents and police torture news. He later joined the Los Angeles Times as a correspondent in Cairo. El-Hamalawy also freelanced for a broad array of local and foreign news organizations, including Bloomberg News and the BBC, and worked as a researcher for Human Rights Watch (HRW). He also worked as a managing editor for the leftist daily El-Badeel and was the founding managing editor of Al-Masry Al-Youm's English Edition as well as being one of founding editorial team of Ahram Online.

El-Hamalawy was a visiting scholar at the Graduate School of Journalism in UC Berkeley, in 2007.

== Activism ==
=== Student activism ===
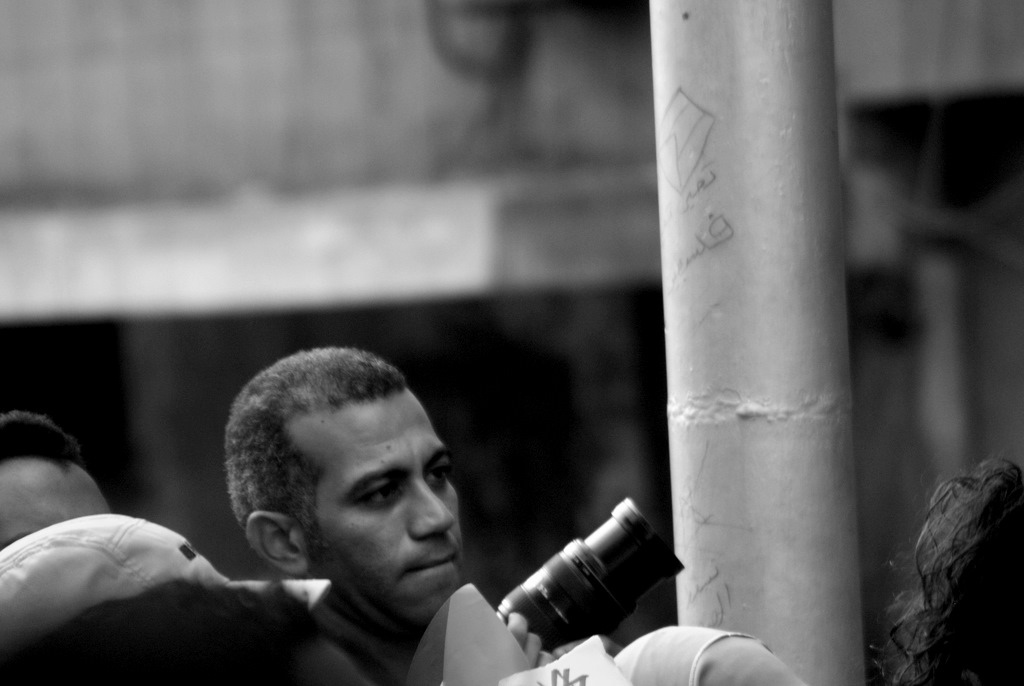
Hossam taking photos.

El-Hamalawy attended the American University in Cairo (AUC) where he graduated with a BA in economics in 1999. Afterward, he pursued an MA in political science at the same university, writing his dissertation on the 1977 Egyptian "Bread Uprising". While still an undergraduate student at the AUC, el-Hamalawy joined the Revolutionary Socialists in 1998. He belongs to the second generation of the organization which joined the movement in the second half of the 1990s. This particular group of activists were credited with reviving the political left on university campuses, after two decades where the Islamists held the upper hand. El-Hamalawy was detained and tortured by deposed Egyptian president Hosni Mubarak's State Security Investigations Service (SSI) in 2000, allegedly with the institution's complicity. Because of his student activism, the Egyptian government maintained a security file on el-Hamalawy. As a result, he was refused employment as a professor by Egyptian universities and he was banned from entering the AUC campus for a year after he finished his MA in 2002. A picture of him was also left with the AUC security guards for several years later with instructions not to be let into campus if there were any ongoing protests. He was later an invited as guest speaker at lectures at AUC nonetheless.

=== Anti-government protests ===
El-Hamalawy was involved in a series of demonstrations in Cairo in 2000 expressing solidarity with the Palestinian al-Aqsa Intifada. According to el-Hamalawy, that particular protest served as the precursor to further anti-Mubarak protests which occurred in later years. He was picked up after one week from the start of the protests by the (SSI).

In May 2002, he was detained and held at the local Nasr City SS office, during a crackdown on leftist activists prior to planned pro-Palestine protests on the Nakba anniversary.

On 20 March 2003, he attended a demonstration in Tahrir Square protesting the US invasion of Iraq and was allegedly beaten by Egyptian security forces dispersing the rally. On 22 March, el-Hamalawy was arrested by four plainclothes security officers while leaving a restaurant in Cairo. He was detained with other youth activists at al-Gamaliyya Police Station and was released shortly afterward.

Hamalawy was a core member of Kefaya, a grassroots Egyptian movement founded in 2004 that organized demonstrations against the Mubarak government in the years preceding the 2011 Egyptian Revolution.

==== 2006 el-Mahalla el-Kubra strike ====
External videos
- Hossam el-Hamalawy talking about 2006 Mahalla strike during Marxism festival of 2008 on YouTube

El-Hamalawy was involved in the el-Mahalla strikes of 2006. Through using his ability to spread the news of the strike through his blog, he was able to give the strikes wider attention which was ultimately one of the key factors that led to their success. In 2008 he made a speech over viewing the events that occurred on the ground in el-Mahalla during the strikes, noting that the women of el-Mahalla were the essential and initial figures who lead the demonstrations and ignited them to the point that they chanted "Where are the men? Here we are, the women!" Even though el-Hamalawy comes from a middle-class family, the workers were pleased with his passion and help, even calling him the "strike's foreign minister." El-Hamalawi also helped the workers organize and mobilize, which made the strike very effective and was another reason why the workers were able to have their demands fulfilled.

==== 2008 Egyptian general strike ====
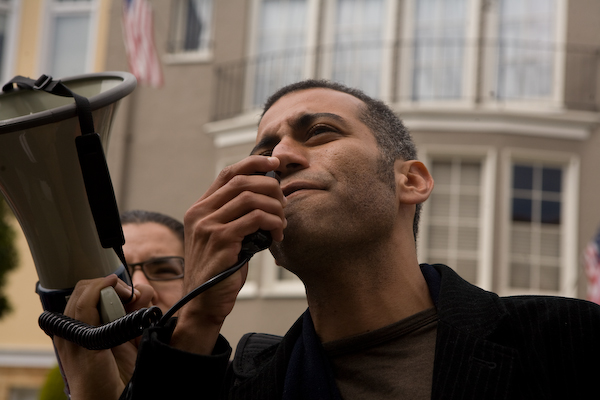
El-Hamalawy addressing a protest demonstration in April 2008

Demanding a higher minimum wage, in February 2008 left-wing activists such as Kamal el-Fayoumi who worked in the state-run textile industry in el-Mahalla organized one of the largest anti-Mubarak labor protests since Mubarak became president in 1981, with around 10,000 factory workers protesting in the streets. Meanwhile, the doctors union voted to go on a national strike on 15 March and university professors launched a national strike on 23 March.

On 6 April 2008, thousands of policemen occupied el-Mahalla and took control of many of the factories in an attempt to obstruct the strike. Thousands of residents including the urban poor, unemployed youth, and other workers joined the street demonstrations, protesting Mubarak, suspected corruption in his government, and price inflation. El-Hamalawy stated that "The demonstrators were met with police tear gas, rubber bullets, and live ammunition," and at least two men were killed. The protest continued for two more days with demonstrators hurling stones at security forces and armored vehicles.

Bloggers and citizen journalists (including el-Hamalawi, Wael Abbas, Alaa Abd El-Fattah and others) used Facebook, Twitter, Flickr, blogs and other social media tools to report on the strike, alert their networks about police activity, organize legal protection and draw attention to their efforts.

=== Blogging ===
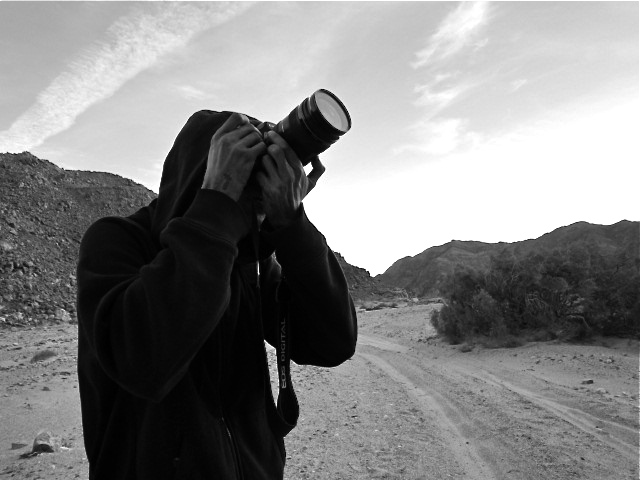
Hossam El-Hamalawy AKA 3arabawy.

Since May 2006, el-Hamalawy maintained a blog on the website The Arabist. The Arabic and English-language blog covered various topics mostly related to Egypt, but also the Arab world, focused particularly on workers strikes, police abuse, corruption and global revolutionary movements. In 2006, he left The Arabist to set up his own website named "3arabawy" ("the Bedouin") which has since been one of Egypt's most popular blogs.

At the time el-Hamalawy noted that the Egyptian blogosphere had undergone a rapid expansion and ideological diversification since the 2005 Egyptian parliamentary election. He viewed social media as a means of publicly communicating to the outside world abuses carried out by the Egyptian authorities as well as street protests against the government. Despite the popularity of el-Hamalawy's blog, only a minority of his readers were working class Egyptians due to the lack of internet access in the country and because most of his posts were written in English. Most of his Egyptian followers were young, urban and educated (Half of the internet traffic coming to his blog is from Cairo). Nonetheless, el-Hamalawy's blog posts were in demand by the Western English-language press. Relevant sectors of the Western mainstream media relied on local bloggers—especially those like el-Hamalawy who had spent time as freelance journalists for Western news agencies—for immediate and first-hand accounts of events in Egypt that were not covered by mainstream Egyptian media. El-Hamalawy believed it was because of his independence from any editorial hierarchy, that he, among other bloggers, was able to regularly document and publish allegations of torture by the Egyptian authorities and the increasing occurrence of sexual harassment and assault in Egypt. The use of photographs and videos made it difficult for the Egyptian government or state-run media to deny the allegations.

=== 2011 Egyptian revolution ===
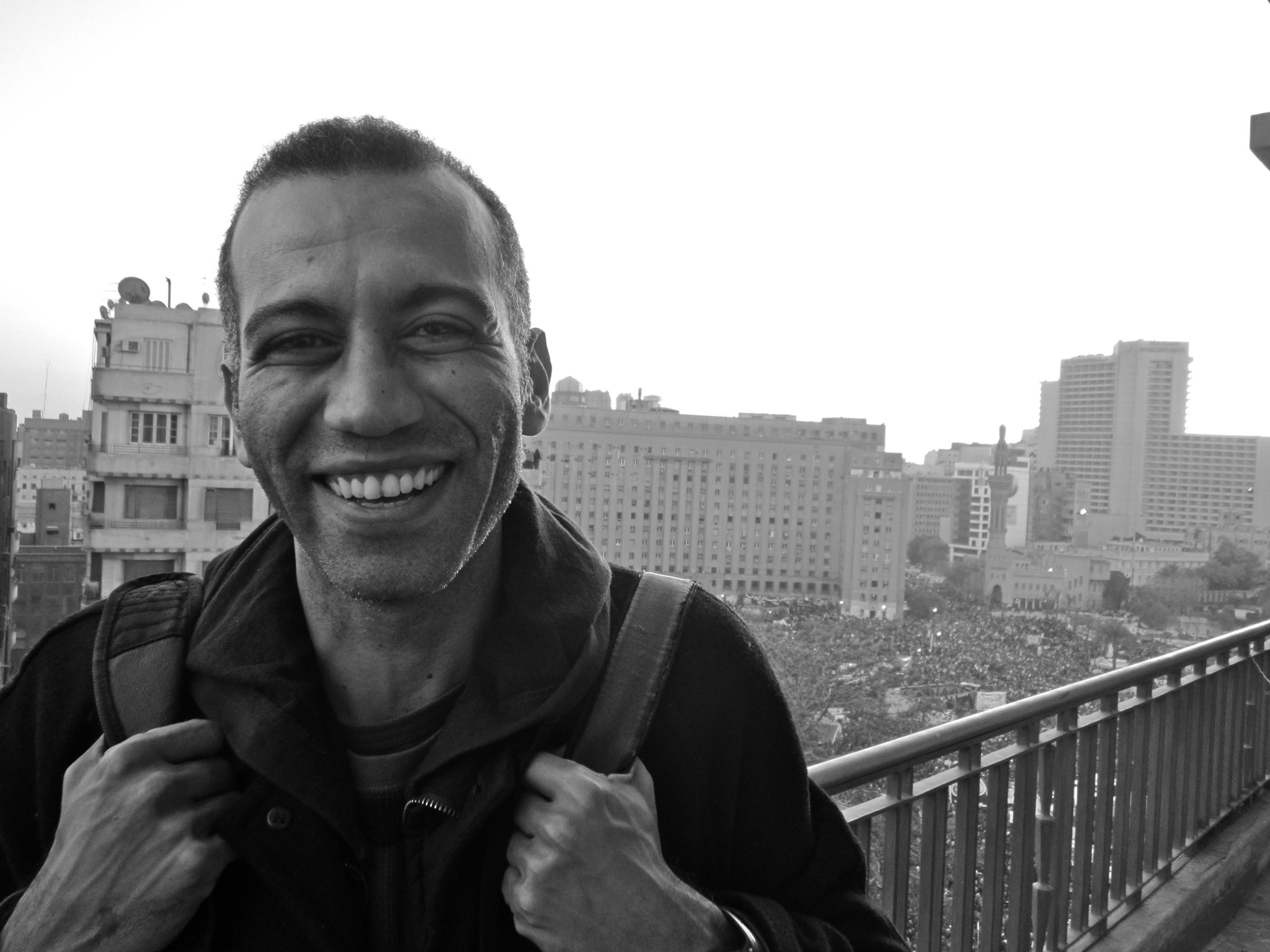
Hossam El-Hamalawy at Tahrir Square.

Because of his experience in earlier demonstrations against the Mubarak government, el-Hamalawy was one of the first participants and organizers of the Egyptian Revolution that commenced on 25 January 2011. On that first day of protest, el-Hamalawy stated to Al-Jazeera that the demonstrations were "necessary to send a message to the Egyptian regime that Mubarak is no different than Ben Ali and we want him to leave too." Tunisian President Zine el-Abedine Ben Ali had been previously overthrown on 18 January as a result of mass popular protests against his government. He also told Al-Jazeera, "People are fed up of Mubarak and of his dictatorship and of his torture chambers and of his failed economic policies. If Mubarak is not overthrown tomorrow then it will be the day after. If it's not the day after it's going to be next week." Mubarak resigned from his post on 11 February, transferring his authority to the Supreme Council of the Armed Forces (SCAF).

El-Hamalawy stated that the revolution was the result of "a process brewing for several years." He claimed that the overthrow of Mubarak had been stirring as early as 2002, when pro-Palestinian riots around Cairo University fought Central Security Forces chanting: "Hosni Mubarak is just like Sharon." El-Hamalawy further noted that "activists from small groups have been agitating for these days of anger ... but no one can claim it [the revolution]."

==== Post-Mubarak ====
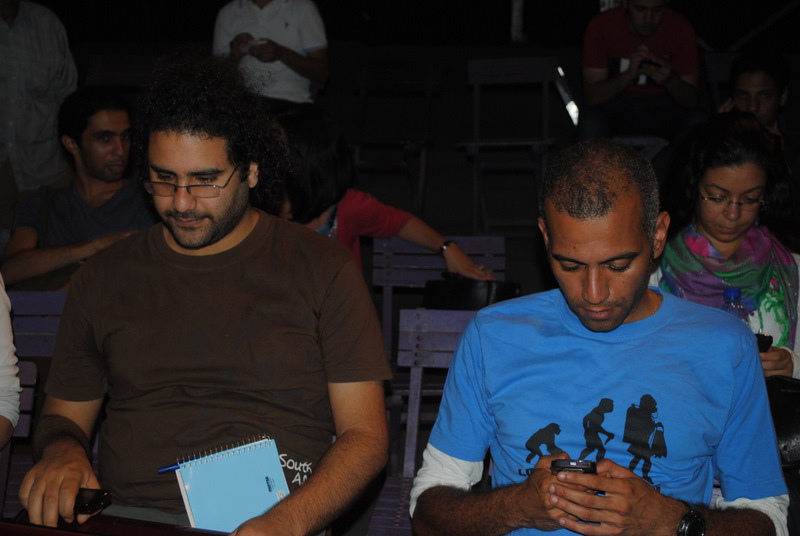
Hossam el-Hamalawy and Alaa Abd El-Fatah.

After the fall of Mubarak during the revolution, el-Hamalawy was among many protesters who stormed and seized the offices of the State Security Investigations Service (SSI) in Nasr City and was able to visit the cell where he had been imprisoned, later writing on his Twitter feed that he could not stop crying. He wrote "Entered the small compound where I was locked. Man, I can't believe it still... Many are literally crying. We can't find the interrogation rooms. This is a citadel." Since storming the SSI offices, el-Hamalawy has become the main force behind a "naming and shaming" website "(Piggipedia)" targeting former SSI personnel who were involved in the alleged torture of dissidents. Their names are linked to allegations and photos.

On 30 May 2011, el-Hamalawy and television host Reem Maged were given a summons on 30 May 2011 to appear before military prosecution after Maged brought el-Hamalawy on her show where he criticized the role of military police; adding: "I hold the head of the military police responsible for torturing activists". He claimed several cases of torture by the military police towards the demonstrators and about the attacks to uncover virginity, which were widely raised in Egyptian public opinion afterward. El-Hamalawy had also criticized the lack of transparency regarding military finances, stating "any institution in the country that takes taxes from us should be open to question." Both were released Tuesday after "chatting" with Military Prosecution and el-Hamalawy was asked to hand in reports of army abuses to authorities.

SCAF escalated its tone against Egypt activists since Mubarak stepped down. They informed the Egyptian people of an attempt to "topple the state," as state-run media said a plot had been discovered. Hossam el-Hamalawy said the statement could signal a new wave of arrests against revolutionary groups like the Revolutionary Socialists, which organizes labor movements. The group which Hossam is a member of, came under criticism in state media after footage of a group meeting showed, Sameh Naguib saying popular pressure must be built against the military to remove Mubarak's loyalists. Hossam said that they saw this move by the SCAF coming a while ago and will continue due to other political forces are withdrawing from the streets. he said. "That is not going to intimidate us." He added "The military is the backbone of the dictatorship. They are the ones who run this country since 1952".

El-Hamalawy boycotted the 2011–2012 Egyptian parliamentary election held from November 2011 to January 2012. He described them as "theater" that would serve to solidify the old guard, but with different faces. El-Hamalawy contended that continued protests, civil disobedience and strikes would bring real change. He also boycotted the 2012 Egyptian Shura Council election (held from 29 January to 22 February 2012) and boycotting the 2012 Egyptian presidential election citing the same reasons.

== Positions and views ==
=== Arab Spring revolutions ===
You cannot build a democracy in a country where you are surrounded by a sea or an ocean of dictatorships.

— Hossam el-Hamalawy

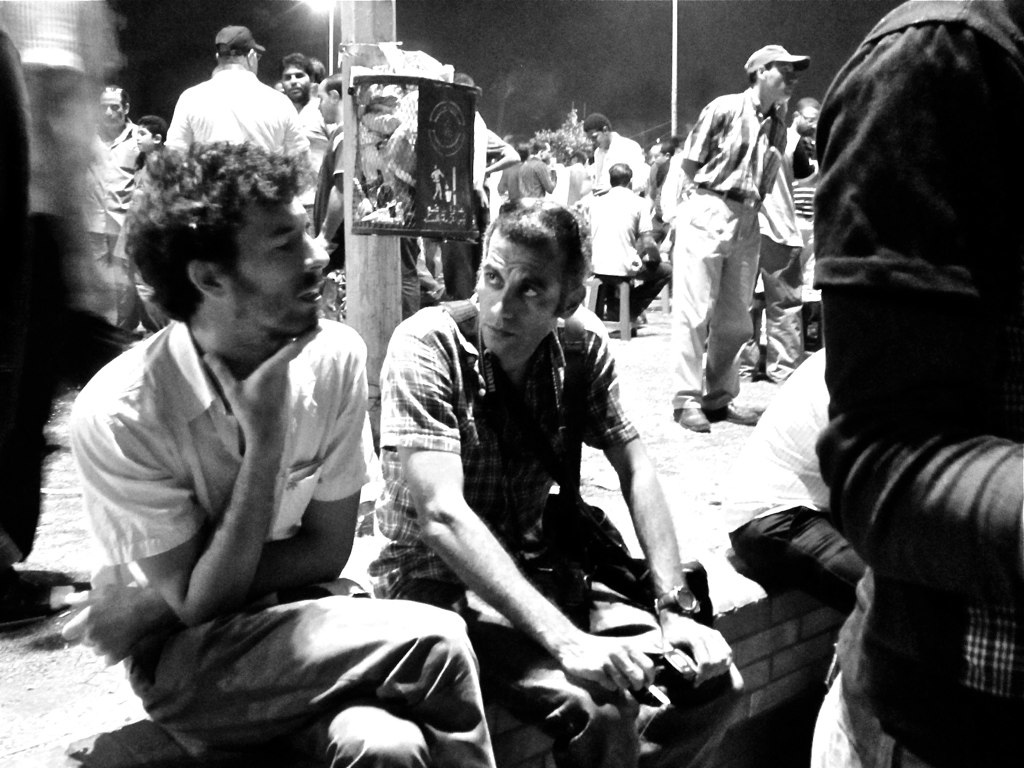
Philip Rizk & Hossam el-Hamalawy taking about the Arab Spring.

During the Libyan Civil War, el-Hamalawy viewed the role of NATO in providing a no-fly zone and other military assistance for the Libyan rebels against Muammar Gaddafi as unnecessary, stating "In all cases, the Libyans would have succeeded, even if it took more time." Commenting on ties between various members of the National Transitional Council (NTC)—which served as the representative of the anti-Gaddafi factions—and the Gaddafi government, el-Hamalawy maintained that as long as the NTC was supported by the Libyan people, he would consider it to be legitimate. However, he opposed any future relations between the NTC and NATO.

El-Hamalawy condemned the support of leftist and Arab nationalist factions in Lebanon for the government of Bashar al-Assad during the Syrian Revolution. He argues that those particular groups often make the mistake of depending on tyrannical governments for supporting armed resistance against Israel. El-Hamalawy claims that, historically, Arab dictatorships have not positively contributed to the Palestinian cause and are in fact hypocritical, since they solely act on their own personal interests. Unlike other Arab leftists, he does not fear a weakening of relations between Syria and the militant opposition against Israel stating "the future of the resistance depends on the Syrian people, who are anti-Zionist in their majority." Referring to Hezbollah leader Hassan Nasrallah's support for the Syrian government, el-Hamalawy believes that Nasrallah damaged his credibility in that decision.

Regarding the Bahraini uprising, el-Hamalawy considers it to be a non-sectarian people's movement, but not yet a revolution. He condemned the description by prominent Muslim cleric Sheikh Yusuf al-Qaradawi of the uprising as a Shia Muslim insurrection against Sunni Muslim rule.

=== SCAF government(s) ===
El-Hamalawy has criticized the newly appointed Justice Minister Mohamed Abdel Aziz el-Gendy, for his ties to deposed president Mubarak, in relation to the freezing of assets of the ousted dictator.

=== Socialism ===
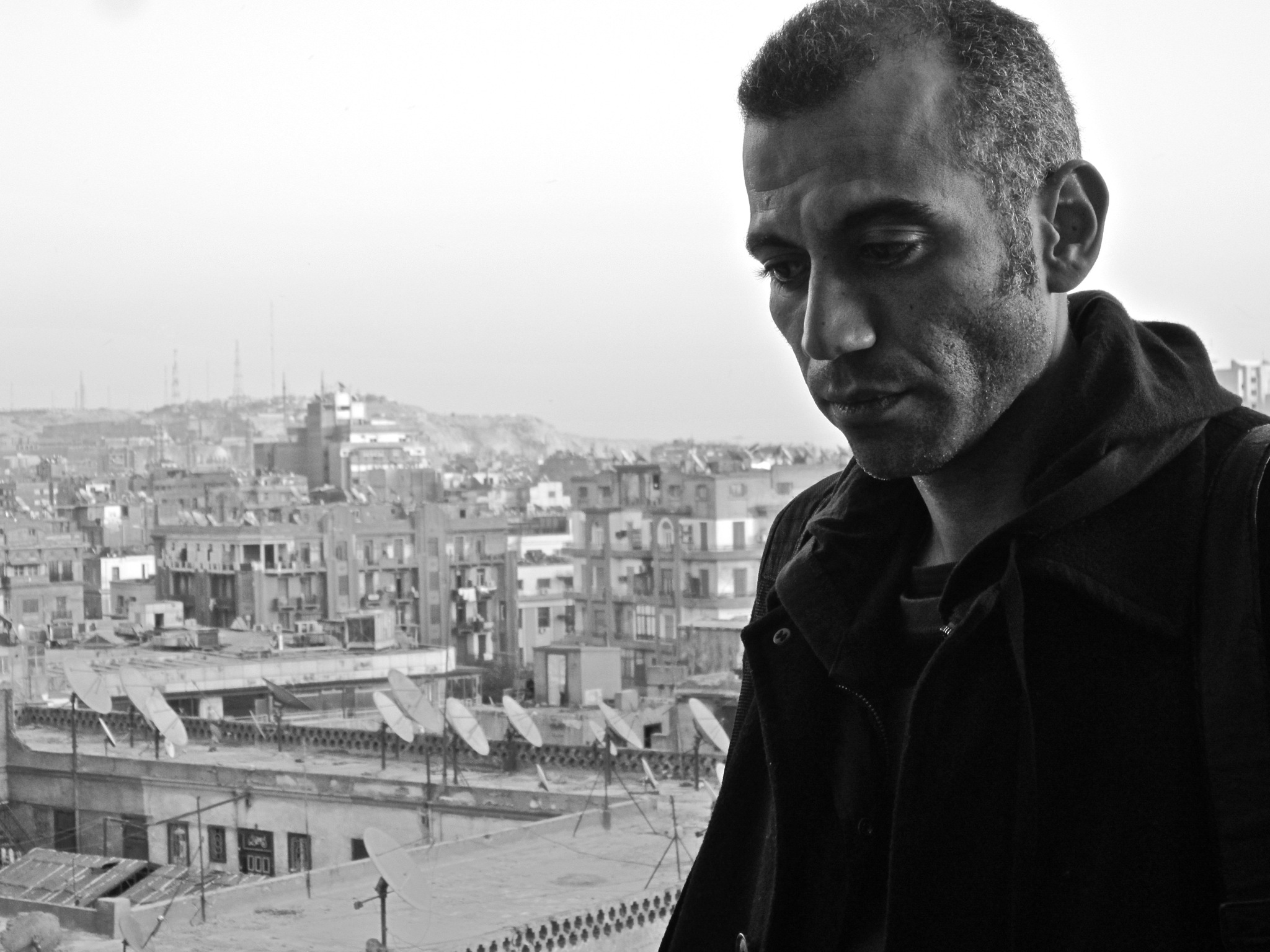
Hossam El-Hamalawy in Cairo

El-Hamalawy said that one of the main demands of most of the left leaning forces in Egypt is the re-nationalization of all the privatized manufacturers. He added that a complete freedom must be given to the Egyptian workers to establish their own independent unions. He said: "I mean, the workers in some sectors are still facing the old managers, who are trying to sabotage their attempts to establish independent unions and the national minimum wage. We have fought so long to raise our national minimum wage to at least 1,200 Egyptian pounds a month."

El-Hamalawy holds the view that Egyptian communism is trapped in a "Stalinist" legacy, an inverse of Trotsky's theory of Permanent Revolution which states that the bourgeois democratic tasks in countries with delayed bourgeois democratic development can only be accomplished through the establishment of a workers' state, and that the creation of a workers' state would inevitably involve inroads against capitalist property. Thus, the accomplishment of bourgeois democratic tasks passes over into proletarian tasks.

=== Israeli–Palestinian conflict ===
Hossam supports a one-state solution (one secular, democratic, non-denominational state) to resolve the Israeli–Palestinian conflict, rather than the politically mainstream two-state solution.

=== Political Islam ===
El-Hamalawy believes that relations between some leftist groups and the Muslim Brotherhood improved significantly from the 1990s, when the groups fought physically on university campuses, to 2005–2006, when leftists and Muslim Brothers coordinated street demonstrations together. He attributes this to the Revolutionary Socialist Organization and "a growing left-leaning human rights community" forming the core of a "new left in Egypt" and to the Second Palestinian Intifada, which "revived Egyptian street politics" and forced generational change in the "new left" and the Muslim Brotherhood. Following the revolution in 2011, el-Hamalawy leveled criticism against the Muslim Brotherhood and the Islamists for their collaboration with military, and later when Morsi was elected. He denounced the Rabaa Massacre and stood against the police crackdown on the Brotherhood.

Although el-Hamalawy opposes Islamism as an ideology, during times of war, he regarded Lebanese and Islamist groups Hezbollah and Hamas, to be defending their respective countries, playing an anti-imperialist role. But he's critical of sectarian policies of Hezbollah and its role in Syria.

== Works ==
- el-Hamalawy, Hossam (5 May 2026). Counterrevolution in Egypt: Sisi's New Republic. Verso Books. ISBN 978-1-80429-761-2.
- el-Hamalawy, Hossam (December 2001). January, 18 and 19, 1977: "Uprising of Thieves" or an Aborted Revolution? (PDF) (Thesis). American University of Cairo. Archived (PDF) from the original on 5 August 2024.

== See also ==
- Alaa Abd El-Fattah
- Shuhdi Atiya ash-Shafi
- Wael Khalil
- Youssef Darwish
- Asmaa Mahfouz
- George Ishak
- Wael Ghonim

== Bibliography ==
- Human Rights Watch (November 2003). Egypt: Security Forces Abuse of Anti-War Demonstrators. Human Rights Watch.
- Human Rights Watch; Tom Kellogg; Hossam El-Hamalawy (May 2005). Black Hole: The Fate of Islamists Rendered to Egypt. Human Rights Watch.
- Loewenstein, Antony (2011). The Blogging Revolution. Melbourne University Publishing. ISBN 978-0-522-85911-9.
- Cook, Steven (2011). The Struggle for Egypt: From Nasser to Tahrir Square. Oxford University Press. ISBN 978-0-19-979526-0.
