= Revolutionary Democratic Coalition =

Defunct Egyptian electoral alliance

- Key figures: Kamal Khalil; Ahmed Bahaa El-Din Shaaban; Adel El-Masha; Salah Adli
- Founded: 19 September 2012
- Dissolved: 2015
- Ideology: Leftism; Secularism
- Political position: Left-wing

The Revolutionary Democratic Coalition (Arabic: التحالف الديمقراطى الثورى, also translated as 'Democratic Revolutionary Coalition') (also called the United Revolutionary Front) was an electoral alliance in Egypt. It is also active in protests as recently as May 2013. The alliance has been described as being composed of "small socialist, communist and radical parties."

== Member organisations ==
- Socialist Popular Alliance Party
- Tagammu Party
- Egyptian Communist Party
- Socialist Party of Egypt
- Workers Democratic Party
- Socialist Revolutionary Movement (January)
- Egyptian Coalition to Fight Corruption
- Mina Daniel Movement
- Socialist Youth Union
- Workers and Peasants Party
- Democratic Popular Movement
