= Kamal Khalil =

Egyptian activist

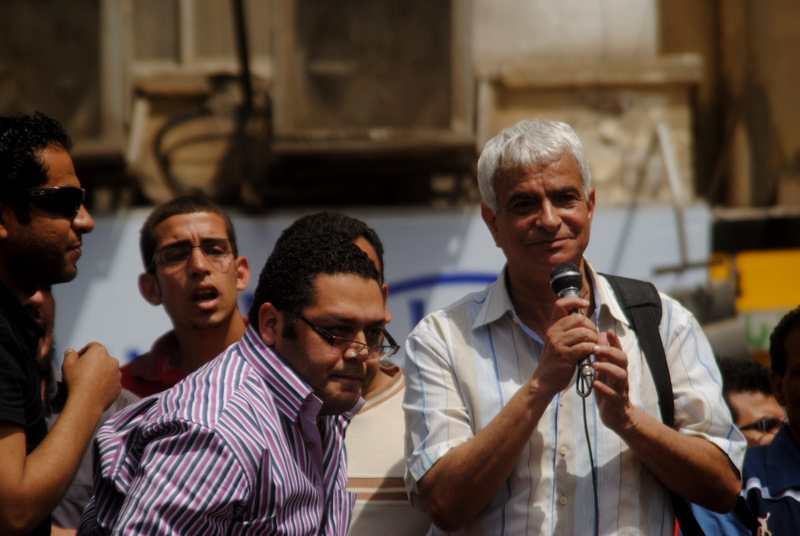
- Kamal Khalil addressing a crowd in the Tahrir Square
- Political party: Revolutionary Socialists, United Revolutionary Front; Workers and Peasants Party
- Children: Omnia Khalil, Amal Khalil

Kamal Khalil (Arabic: كمال خليل, IPA: [kæˈmæːl xæˈliːl]) is an Egyptian engineer and labour activist. He is a leading member of the Revolutionary Socialists, a representative of the Workers Democratic Party and the founder and director of the Center for Socialist Studies in Cairo. He is a critic of the social democrats, youth parties and the Muslim Brotherhood in the post-Mubarak Egypt. He advocates more workers' unity, particularly in regions such as El-Mahalla El-Kubra, which has in the past been a center of industrial struggle by textile workers. Khalil has said Egypt's workers must create independent trade unions and a political party to represent them: "No party will represent the workers other than the workers' party itself." Prior to the Egyptian Revolution of 2011, Khalil had been arrested many times. In 2003, he was arrested by the State Security Investigations Service (SSI) and placed in solitary confinement for his role in the anti-war movement, causing the Stop the War Coalition in Britain to demonstrate outside the Egyptian Embassy in London.

== See also ==
- Revolutionary Socialists
- Workers Democratic Party
- Center for Socialist Studies
