= Wael Khalil =

Egyptian political activist (born 1965)

- وائل خليل
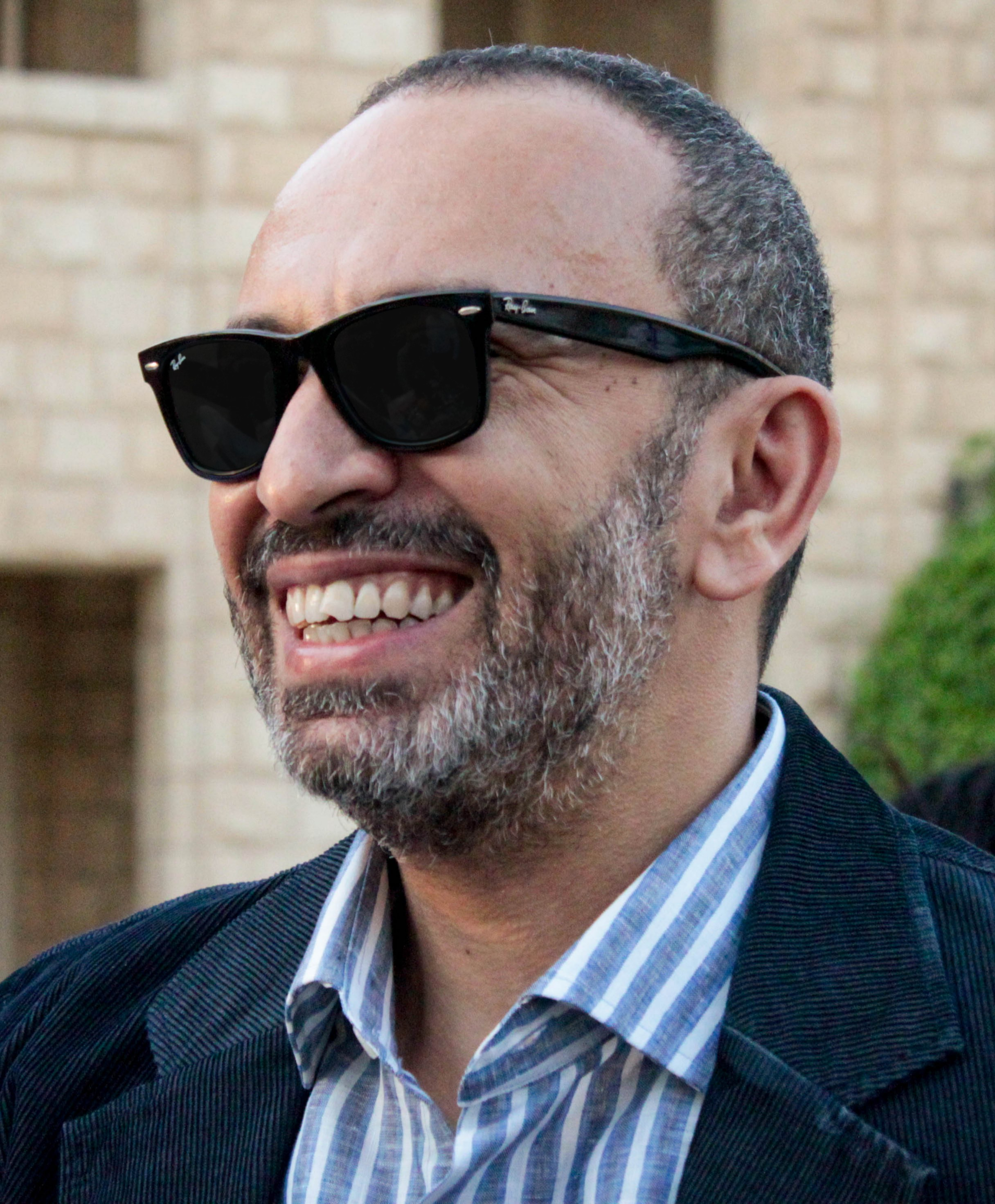
- Khalil in 2013
- Born: 21 December 1965 (age 60); Egypt
- Known for: 2010 Al Ahram photo scandal
- Spouse: Lamia Bulbul
- Parent(s): Ahmad Khalil and Mohsena Tawfik
- Relatives: Azza Khalil (Sister)
- Website: waelk.net

Wael Khalil (Arabic: وائل خليل; born December 21, 1965) is an Egyptian political activist known for his criticism of the Mubarak regime, his activity during the 2011 Egyptian revolution, and his blog WaELK.net which covers government, activism and sports.

== Personal life ==
Khalil is a software engineer by trade.

== Early activism ==
Wael Khalil joined the Revolutionary Socialists in 1992 but left them in 2011 after Hosni Mubarak resignation by few weeks. Khalil began his activism in 2000 as part of the Egyptian anti-war and anti-globalisation movement. He believes that political reform is rooted in the anti-war and Palestine solidarity movements. He also believes that dictatorship leads to imperialism.

He was a protester from the Egyptian opposition movement Kefaya. He also co-founded the 20 March Popular Campaign for Change.

In 2006 he criticized Egyptian police after at Sudanese refugees were killed at a squatter camp in Cairo. He said, "When you kill little babies, things have changed...We will try you, and you won't be able to travel abroad again."

== Al Ahram photo scandal ==
In September 2010 Khalil reported on an altered photograph in Al-Ahram in which editors had changed the position of president Hosni Mubarak from the back of a row of heads of state to the front. On his blog Waelk.net Khalil posted the photoshopped image alongside the original taken by Associated Press, which showed Mubarak actually behind Israeli Prime Minister Benjamin Netanyahu, Palestinian President Mahmoud Abbas, Jordanian King Abdullah II, and United States President Barack Obama at a media event at the White House.

Egyptian Chronicles blog commented, "The photo scandal of the week which is making headlines worldwide is another triumph to the Egyptian blogosphere as the one who discovered from all the world is Egyptian follow blogger Wael Khalil...I repeat the one who discovered is Wael Khalil...Who said that blogs are losing their power in Egypt !!??"

== 2011 Egyptian revolution ==
Khalil was active during the 2011 Egyptian revolution and its aftermath.

In May 2011 Khalil spoke out for a second wave of protests in support of a "Friday of rage" against the Supreme Council of the Armed Forces (SCAF). In an editorial in The Guardian, Khalil's criticisms of the SCAF focused on rumors about pardoning Mubarak and members of his regime, physical or violent reactions of security forces during protests, the army's use of military trials against civilians, use of trials against protesters and 'normal citizens', and he also noted the prior successes which resulted from large protests in Tahrir Square. He wrote, "The call for a 'second revolution' chimes with a growing restlessness and impatience at the pace of developments and the overall performance of the governing Supreme Council of the Armed Forces (SCAF)....We will be out again in Tahrir Square on Friday 27 May in order to assert that the interim power respect our rights and demands. The Egyptian people have earned their right to control the future of this country."

In July 2011 Al-Ahram profiled Khalil's presence at a meeting with Prime Minister Essam Sharaf, along with four other activists, which prompted a debate on Twitter about whether or not the activists represented to growing protests. Seven demands, agreed upon by several organisations, were presented to Sharaf. The meeting happened while in Tahrir square protesters gathered in their second major wave of activism.

== 2011 Budget policy ==
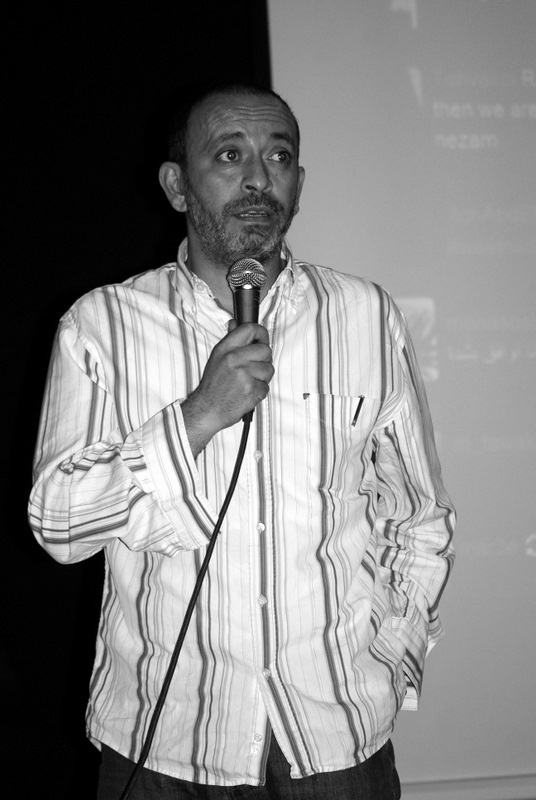
Wael Khalil speaking at Tweet Nadwa about the 2011 Budget

In a June 2011 editorial in The Guardian, Khalil criticized support from the International Monetary Fund (IMF), which included a $3 billion loan. He said, "But many people, myself included, were unhappy with this news and the impact such a loan will have on deepening the country's debt and mounting debt servicing burden." Khalil equated help from the bank with "neoliberal[ism]", "imperialism", and the politics of the Mubarak regime. He blamed such policies for economic stagnation, deterioration, and growing inequality under Mubarak. Khalil cited IMF ex-employee and Mubarak regime finance minister Youssef Boutros-Ghali, who was sentenced to prison for corruption. He said, "I believe that this country's future lies not with the same highly paid, unelected, unaccountable bureaucrats of the IMF, nor with their sacred indicators of budget deficits and market economics. Our future lies with a new home-grown economics that caters for the majority of Egyptians, the schools where their children are educated, the hospitals where they receive healthcare, and the jobs that guarantee them decent and honourable living."

In July 2011, Khalil criticized a proposed increase in Egypt's minimum wage as insufficiently large. Khalil said the new wage, while "an improvement" represented an "example of the priority of the government to lean on the poor and working majority in order to protect the interests of businessmen and the established elite."

Khalil also supported the proposed budget's decreasing of the deficit but criticized the means to do so which he said put more burden on workers and pensioners rather than raising capital gains taxes. Khalil said, "We need to continue mass demonstrations to pressure the government, [because] it won’t stop with just the budget and the decision on minimum wage, but they will continue leaning on workers, on the country’s weakest side."

Khalil argued that in the movement for reform social rights were necessary as well as political rights. He said, "We must not only mobilize people, but also debate and explain specifically why social justice is important for [Egypt]. You cannot really say that you want democracy, and then after that you’ll [work to] get social justice. No. If you do it in this order, you’ll end up with nothing."

== See also ==
- Alaa Abd El-Fatah
- Nawara Negm
- Saad Eddin Ibrahim
