= Workers and Peasants Party (Egypt) =

Political party in Egypt

- Founder: Kamal Khalil
- Ideology: Socialism
- Political position: Left-wing
- National affiliation: Revolutionary Democratic Coalition
- House of Representatives: 0 / 568

The Workers and Peasants Party, also known as the Party of Workers and Farmers, is a socialist political party in Egypt.

In September 2012, it became part of the Democratic Revolutionary Coalition.
