= Wael Ghonim =

Egyptian activist and engineer

Wael Ghonim وائل غنيم
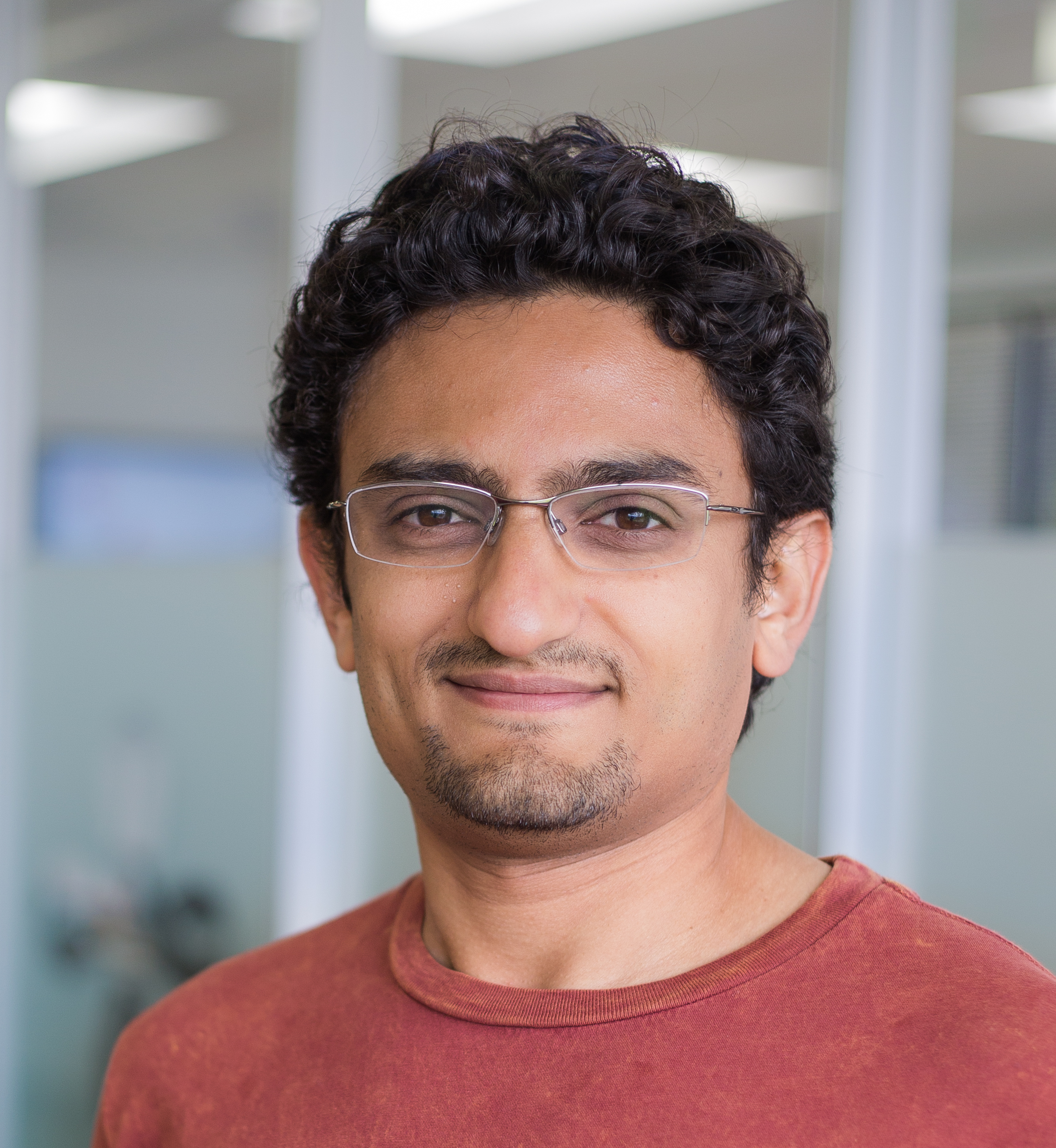
- Wael Ghonim in 2014
- Born: 23 December 1980 (age 45); Cairo, Egypt
- Education: American University in Cairo (M.B.A.); Cairo University (B.S.)
- Occupation: Group Product Manager
- Employer(s): Google, Quora
- Known for: Playing a prominent role in sparking the Egyptian Revolution of 2011
- Awards: JFK Profile in Courage Award (2011)

Wael Ghonim (Arabic: وائل غنيم [ˈwæːʔel ɣoˈneːm]; born 23 December 1980) is an Internet activist and computer engineer with an interest in social entrepreneurship.

In 2011, he became an international figure and galvanized pro-democracy demonstrations in Egypt after his emotional interview following 11 days of secret incarceration by Egyptian police. During these 11 days, he was interrogated regarding his work as one of two administrators of the Facebook page "We are all Khaled Said", which helped spark the Egyptian Revolution of 2011. Time magazine included him in its "Time 100" list of the 100 most influential people of 2011, and the World Economic Forum selected him as one of the Young Global Leaders in 2012.

Ghonim is the author of Revolution 2.0: The power of people is greater than the people in power (2013). In 2012, he founded Tahrir Academy, a technology focused NGO that aims to foster education in Egypt. In 2015, Ghonim co-founded Parlio, a social media platform that was acquired by Quora in March 2016. He is currently a non-resident senior fellow at Harvard's Ash Center for Democratic Governance and Innovation.

== Background ==
Ghonim was born to a middle-class family on 23 December 1980 in Cairo, Egypt, and grew up in Abha, Saudi Arabia. When he was 13 years old, he moved back to live in Cairo.

He earned a BS in computer engineering from Cairo University in 2004 and an MBA, with honors, in marketing and finance from the American University in Cairo in 2008.

== Professional career ==
Between 2002 and 2005, Ghonim was the Marketing and Sales Manager of Gawab. In 2005, Ghonim left Gawab to establish Mubasher.info, a financial portal serving the Middle East region. Ghonim joined Google Middle East and North Africa as its Regional Marketing Manager in 2008 based in Google Egypt. In January 2010, Ghonim became Head of Marketing of Google Middle East and North Africa based in Google's United Arab Emirates office in Dubai Internet City in Dubai. During the Egyptian Revolution of 2011, Ghonim took leave from Google to focus on his work in Egypt and the Middle East. In 2014, Ghonim joined Google Ventures as an Entrepreneur in Residence before resigning in December to work at a start-up company.

== Works ==
Ghonim's memoir, "Revolution 2.0", was published in January 2012 by Houghton Mifflin Harcourt in the U.S. and by HarperCollins in the UK. A reviewer at The New York Times called the book "a touchstone for future testimonials about a strengthening borderless digital movement that is set to continually disrupt powerful institutions, be they corporate enterprises or political regimes".

== Involvement in the Egyptian Revolution of 2011 ==
In 2010, Ghonim founded a Facebook page titled, "We Are All Khaled Said," in support of Khaled Said, a young Egyptian who was tortured to death by police in Alexandria. Ghonim used this page in moving and integrating the anti-government protests of the January 25 Revolution. He first made an announcement on the page on 14 January, asking members whether they were going to plan on taking to the streets on 25 January and do what Tunisia did. In less than two hours, he published an event titled "25 يناير على التعذيب والفساد والظلم والبطالة" ["January 25: Revolution against Torture, Corruption, Unemployment and Injustice"]. This was the first of several invitations to the page. He anonymously collaborated with activists on the ground to announce the locations for the protest.

The page also organized other activities such as the Silent Stands and the Police Communication Campaign.

In January 2011, Ghonim persuaded Google to allow him to return to Egypt, citing "personal issues". He came to Egypt to partake in the Egyptian revolution but he disappeared on 27 January during the nationwide unrest in Egypt. His family told Al-Arabiya and other international media that he was missing. Google also issued a statement confirming the disappearance. Many bloggers like Chris DiBona and Habib Haddad campaigned in an attempt to identify his whereabouts.

On 5 February 2011, Mostafa Alnagar, a major Egyptian opposition figure, reported that Wael Ghonim was alive and detained by the authorities and to be released "within hours". On 6 February 2011, Amnesty International demanded that the Egyptian authorities disclose where Ghonim was and to release him.

On 7 February, Ghonim was released after 11 days in detention. Upon his release, he was greeted with cheers and applause when he stated, "We will not abandon our demand and that is the departure of the regime."

The same day, Ghonim appeared on the Egyptian channel DreamTV on the 10:00 pm program hosted by Mona El-Shazly. In the interview, he praised the protesters and mourned the dead as the host read their names and showed their pictures, eventually becoming "overwhelmed" and rising to walk off camera. The host followed. In the interview, he urged that the protesters deserved attention more than he did and called for the end of the Mubarak regime, describing it as "rubbish". Becoming a symbol of the revolution in Egypt, Ghonim stated that he is "ready to die" for the cause.

His final statements at the end of the interview were, "I want to tell every mother and every father who lost a son, I am sorry, but this is not our mistake" and "I swear to God, it's not our mistake. It's the mistake of every one of those in power who doesn't want to let go of it."

On 9 February, Ghonim addressed the crowds in Tahrir Square, telling the protesters: "This is not the time for individuals, or parties, or movements. It's a time for all of us to say just one thing: Egypt above all."

Ghonim also made an appearance on 60 Minutes, sitting down with Harry Smith. During his interview he said:

"Our revolution is like Wikipedia, okay? Everyone is contributing content, [but] you don't know the names of the people contributing the content. This is exactly what happened. Revolution 2.0 in Egypt was exactly the same. Everyone contributing small pieces, bits and pieces. We drew this whole picture of a revolution. And no one is the hero in that picture."

The scholar Fouad Ajami writes about the revolution:

"No turbaned ayatollah had stepped forth to summon the crowd. This was not Iran in 1979. A young Google executive, Wael Ghonim, had energized this protest when it might have lost heart, when it could have succumbed to the belief that this regime and its leader were a big, immovable object. Mr. Ghonim was a man of the modern world. He was not driven by piety. The condition of his country—the abject poverty, the crony economy of plunder and corruption, the cruelties and slights handed out to Egyptians in all walks of life by a police state that the people had outgrown and despaired of—had given this young man and others like him their historical warrant."

== Philanthropy ==
In 2012 following a book deal he signed, Ghonim decided to donate its proceeds, worth US$2.5 million, to charity work in Egypt. He founded Tahrir Academy, a nonprofit online collaborative learning platform, aiming to transform young Egyptians' characters. The goal is to create future leaders who are critical thinkers. He currently serves as the chairperson of the foundation. In 2015, the academy halted its activities because it was no longer able to secure funding.

== Awards ==
Ghonim topped Time magazine's yearly list of the world's 100 most influential people. On 26 April, he arrived in New York to be honored at the 2011 Time 100 Gala ceremony, where he began his speech with a moment of silence to mark those killed in protests around the Arab world.

On 3 May, World Press Freedom Day, Wael Ghonim was awarded with the Press Freedom prize from the Swedish division of Reporters Without Borders.

Ghonim also received the JFK Profile in Courage Award. On 23 May, Caroline Kennedy, daughter of President John F. Kennedy, presented the awards to Elizabeth Redenbaugh and Wael Ghonim, who was named a recipient on behalf of "the people of Egypt". Kennedy said she could think of no better recipients.

Ghonim was ranked the second most powerful Arab in Arabian Business's annual Power 500 of the world's most influential Arabs.

The magazine's annual report stated Ghonim as the primary contributor to the promotion and coordination of the movement of Egyptian youth through "Facebook", adding that Ghonim came to international fame via commercial news outlets word of mouth after his leadership during the Egyptian revolution.

== Personal life ==
Ghonim was married to Ilka Johannson (div. Nov 2011), an American, and has two children, Isra and Adam.

== Criticism ==
Ghonim's social media feeds and public statements attracted criticism in 2011. Shortly before the resignation of former Egyptian president Hosni Mubarak, Ghonim presented a deal to the Egyptian people in which Mubarak could have remained in Cairo with an "honorary status". He later appeared on Al Arabiya TV and called the rumor as Mubarak-regime propaganda, adding, "I am stronger than Hosni Mubarak. I am stronger than Omar Suleiman."

From 18 May 2011, a major campaign on Twitter gained momentum with the hashtag #unfollowedghonimbecause, criticising Ghonim for various failings and an exaggerated focus on the Egyptian economy.

Ghonim has also been criticized for failing to remedy doubts about the genesis of the "We are all Khalid Said" Facebook page, which is believed to have had at least one more initiator.

In response to the above criticism, some of Ghonim's supporters launched a Facebook page in mid 2011, trying to declare him the spokesperson for the Egyptian revolutionaries, a role that Ghonim has consistently rejected. More than 400,000 people joined the page. Moreover, more than 360,000 people joined his personal page on Facebook and more than 3,000,000 people joined the "We are all Khaled Said" page, which is run by him and another administrator, revealed to be AbdelRahman Mansour.

== See also ==
- April 6 Youth Movement
- Asmaa Mahfouz
- Death of Khaled Mohamed Saeed
- Wael Abbas
- George Isaac
- Hossam el-Hamalawy
