= Haitham Mohamedain =

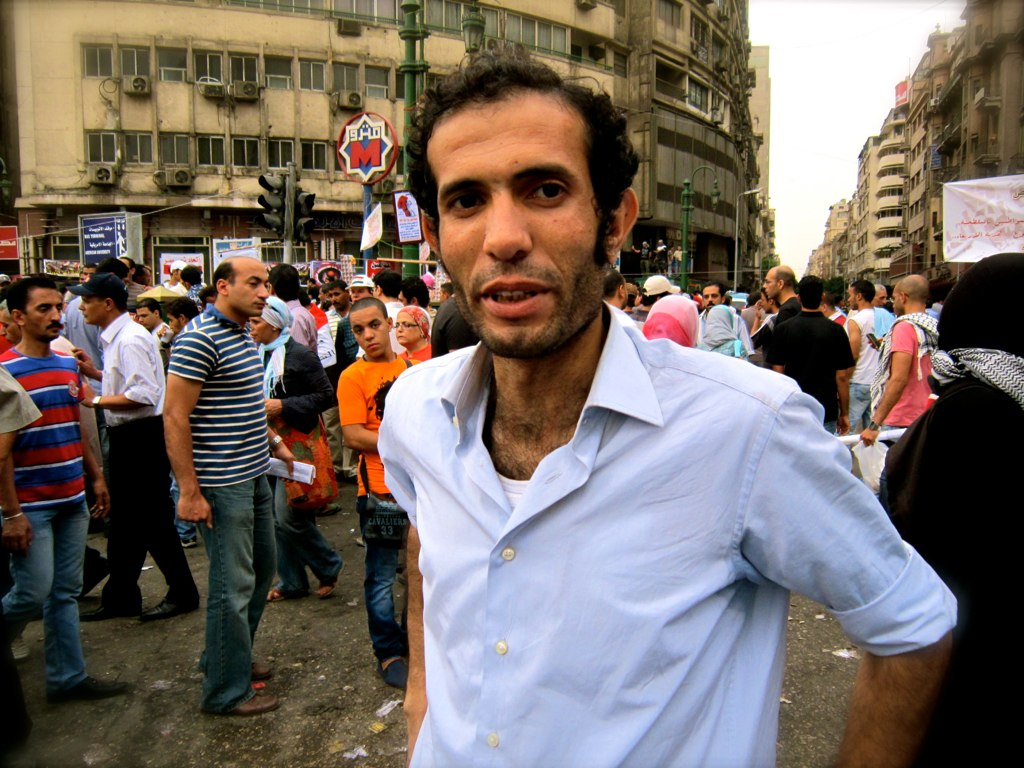
Haytham Mohamedain

Haitham Mohamedain is an Egyptian labor lawyer and political activist. He is a leading member of the Revolutionary Socialists and also a co-founder of the Revolution Path Front.

== Legal career and political activism ==
Haitham Mohamedain acted as a member of the defense team for workers tried by an Emergency State Security Court in the wake of the April 6, 2008 Mahalla uprising. In his work as a lawyer, he defended striking employees and victims of police torture. He has also worked to establish independent and worker-run labor unions.

As a leading figure in the Revolutionary Socialists movement and the Road of the Revolution Front, Haitham Moamedain has been instrumental in organizing opposition to and protests against the anti-protest law passed by the transitional government in 2013. He also participated in the June 30 protests against Mohamed Morsi and continued to protest the new military government after the coup. He wrote a letter from prison denouncing the transfer of Tiran Island and Sanafir Island to Saudi Arabia.

He has worked as part of a number of organizations supporting human rights in Egypt, such as the El Nadeem Center.

== Arrests ==
Mohamedain participated in the protests of the 2011 Egyptian Revolution and was briefly detained and interrogated by state security during the course of the revolution. He was detained on a short-term basis again in 2013 and 2016

In 2018, he was arrested again, and held for five months before being released on probation. In response to the 2018 arrest the International Socialist Organization, the Egyptian Solidarity Initiative and People before Profit put out a statement demanding for him to be freed.

Mohamedain was arrested again on 13 May 2019. He was accused of violating the terms of his probation. Uniformed police officers blindfolded him and held him in the al-Saff police station for three days. Officers at the police station initially denied his presence there, then, after informally admitting to it, did not allow contact with family or a lawyer. On 16 May, he appeared before the Supreme State Security Prosecution and was charged with, "collaborating with a terrorist organization with the intention of organizing anti-government protests during the Africa Cup of Nations." He has been held in pre-trial detention since, exceeding the 2-year limit on pre-trial detention placed by the Egyptian criminal code.

Amnesty International put out a statement, "calling on the Egyptian authorities to immediately and unconditionally release Mostafa Maher and Haytham Mohamdeen as their detention is arbitrary, and the charge against them is overly vague and has no credible basis. They appear to have been targeted solely because of their history of peaceful activism." Ordre des avocats de Geneve wrote a letter expressing concern over his arrest and the broader situation of human rights lawyers in Egypt. The Haldane Society of Socialist Lawyers gave a lecture on Mohamedain's case.

The Tom Lantos Human Rights Commission has taken on his case as well, as a part of the Defending Freedom Project.
