= Killing of Khaled Mohamed Saeed =

Egyptian who died due to police brutality

Khaled Mohamed Saeed
- Photograph of Saeed
- Born: 27 January 1982
- Died: 6 June 2010 (aged 28); Sidi Gaber, Alexandria, Egypt
- Cause of death: Police brutality
- Resting place: Alexandria, Egypt

Khaled Mohamed Saeed (Arabic: خالد محمد سعيد IPA: [ˈxæːled mæˈħæmmæd sæˈʕiːd]; 27 January 1982 – 6 June 2010) was an Egyptian man whose death in police custody in the Sidi Gaber area of Alexandria on 6 June 2010 helped incite the 2011 Egyptian revolution. Photos of his disfigured corpse spread throughout online communities and incited outrage over the fact that he was beaten to death by Egyptian security forces. A prominent Facebook group, "We are all Khaled Said", moderated by Wael Ghonim, brought attention to his death and contributed to growing discontent in the weeks leading up to the 2011 uprising. In October 2011, two Egyptian police officers were found guilty of manslaughter and sentenced to seven years in prison for beating Saeed to death. They were granted a retrial and sentenced to ten years in prison on 3 March 2014.

== Personal life ==
Saeed was raised by his mother and the rest of his extended family after the death of his father when he was young. Showing an interest in computers, he studied computer programming for some time in the United States. He also loved music and had been composing a musical piece before his death.

== Death ==
On 6 June 2010, Saeed was sitting on the second floor of a cybercafe when two detectives from the Sidi Gaber police station entered the premises and arrested him.

Multiple witnesses testified that Saeed was beaten to death by the police, who reportedly hit him and smashed him against objects as he was led outside to their police car. The owner of the internet cafe in which Saeed was arrested stated that he witnessed Saeed being beaten to death in the doorway of the building across the street after the detectives took him out of the cafe at the owner's request.

'We thought they would just interrogate him or ask him questions. But they took him as he struggled with his hands behind his back and banged his head against the marble table inside here,' Mosbah said in an interview conducted by a journalist from the liberal opposition al-Ghad newspaper. Mosbah said he told the police to take it outside and they hauled Said into the doorway of a nearby building. He did not emerge alive, said the cafe owner.

— "Egypt cafe owner describes police beating death",
—The San Diego Union-Tribune

In a filmed interview posted online by a leading opposition party, cafe owner Hassan Mosbah described the beating. "They dragged him to the adjacent building and banged his head against an iron door, the steps of the staircase and walls of the building... Two doctors happened to be there and tried in vain to revive him but (the police) continued beating him... They continued to beat him even when he was dead." This description given by the owner was confirmed by the Egyptian Organization for Human Rights.

The police reported that Saeed suffocated in an attempt to swallow a packet of hashish, a claim supported by two autopsy reports made by Forensic Authorities. The police further stated that Saeed was "wanted for theft and weapons possession and that he resisted arrest".

Former chief medical examiner of Egypt, Ayman Fouda, was interviewed about the proper procedure that should have been followed for Saeed's autopsy. He stated that the "mechanics of the injuries" that Saeed had sustained should have been investigated and his brain should have also been tested to see whether he had sustained a concussion. The medical examiner who conducted the autopsy had done neither.

The two police officers were later jailed for four days pending questioning on beatings that they carried out on Saeed. Saeed's family members stated that Saeed was "tortured to death for possessing video material that implicates members of the police in a drug deal".

== Post-mortem photographs go viral ==
Post mortem imagery of Khaled Saeed's corpse in the morgue

When Saaed's family visited his body in the morgue, his brother took pictures of the corpse using his mobile phone. The photo of Saeed's corpse was released onto the internet by Saeed's family in June 2010, causing a large outcry. Human Rights Watch released a press report about the photo that stated, "Photos of Said's battered and deformed face published on the internet show a fractured skull, dislocated jaw, broken nose, and numerous other signs of trauma" and that the image clearly showed "strong evidence that plainclothes security officers beat him in a vicious and public manner".

== We are all Khaled Saeed ==
Among those who saw the photo was Google marketing executive Wael Ghonim. Ghonim was located in Dubai at the time of the incident and decided to create a Facebook memorial page for Said, called "We are all Khaled Said" within five days of his death. The page attracted hundreds of thousands of followers, becoming Egypt's biggest dissident Facebook page. Support for Said rapidly spread, with many Facebook members using his photograph for their own profiles. In mid-June, the Facebook page had already 130,000 members that were active. Because of the photo and the heavy amount of international criticism that arose from the incident, the Egyptian government consented to a trial for the two detectives involved in his death.

On 27 January 2011, Ghonim was arrested for 12 days. Egypt also blocked nearly all access to the internet throughout the country. Ghonim wanted to remain anonymous but could not avoid Egyptian security forces. It later became apparent that Ghonim recruited an Egyptian political activist named Abdul Rahman Mansour to become his co-admin. Both administrators received the credit for the creation of the site. Under the anonymous name el shaheed ("the martyr"), they were able to post and moderate the Arabic Facebook page. The involvement of Mansour in the creation of this page caused great controversy because he was a member of the 25 January coalition as well as the author of an article on the Muslim Brotherhood's English website titled "Mastermind Behind Egypt Uprising." In a 2011 interview, Ghonim blamed the regime for the people's anger, saying that blocking access to Facebook made them even angrier and led them to protests in the streets.

The administrator's role in running this page, according to Iskander, included a number of important functions, such as being: "the gatekeeper, flag bearer, spokesperson, democrat, motivator, mobilizer, and the source of general inspiration and appeal for the page. In addition to being the liaison between members, the admin is also the link and mediator between the members and the architecture of the page, which in this case is Facebook as an organization. His/her task is to keep everyone energized and inspiringly engaged."

The profile photograph promoting the page was a smiling photograph of Khaled Saeed which conveyed his youth and innocence. The Facebook page existed in both Arabic and English, ensuring international exposure. Police forces were put under the spotlight because the webpage was advocating the fight against police brutality. By doing this, police forces became hesitant with their actions knowing that the Facebook page was being used to document their flaws and overuse of force.

== Alexandria protests ==
On 25 June 2010, Mohamed ElBaradei, former head of the International Atomic Energy Agency, led a rally in Alexandria against abuses by the police and visited Saeed's family to offer condolences. Protests over Saeed's death also occurred in Cairo's Tahrir Square and in front of the Egyptian Embassy in London. Thirty of the protesters in Tahrir Square were arrested by Central Security officers after the "security personnel vigorously beat back the crowds to keep them from reaching the ministry building."

== Impact on the 2011 Egyptian revolution ==
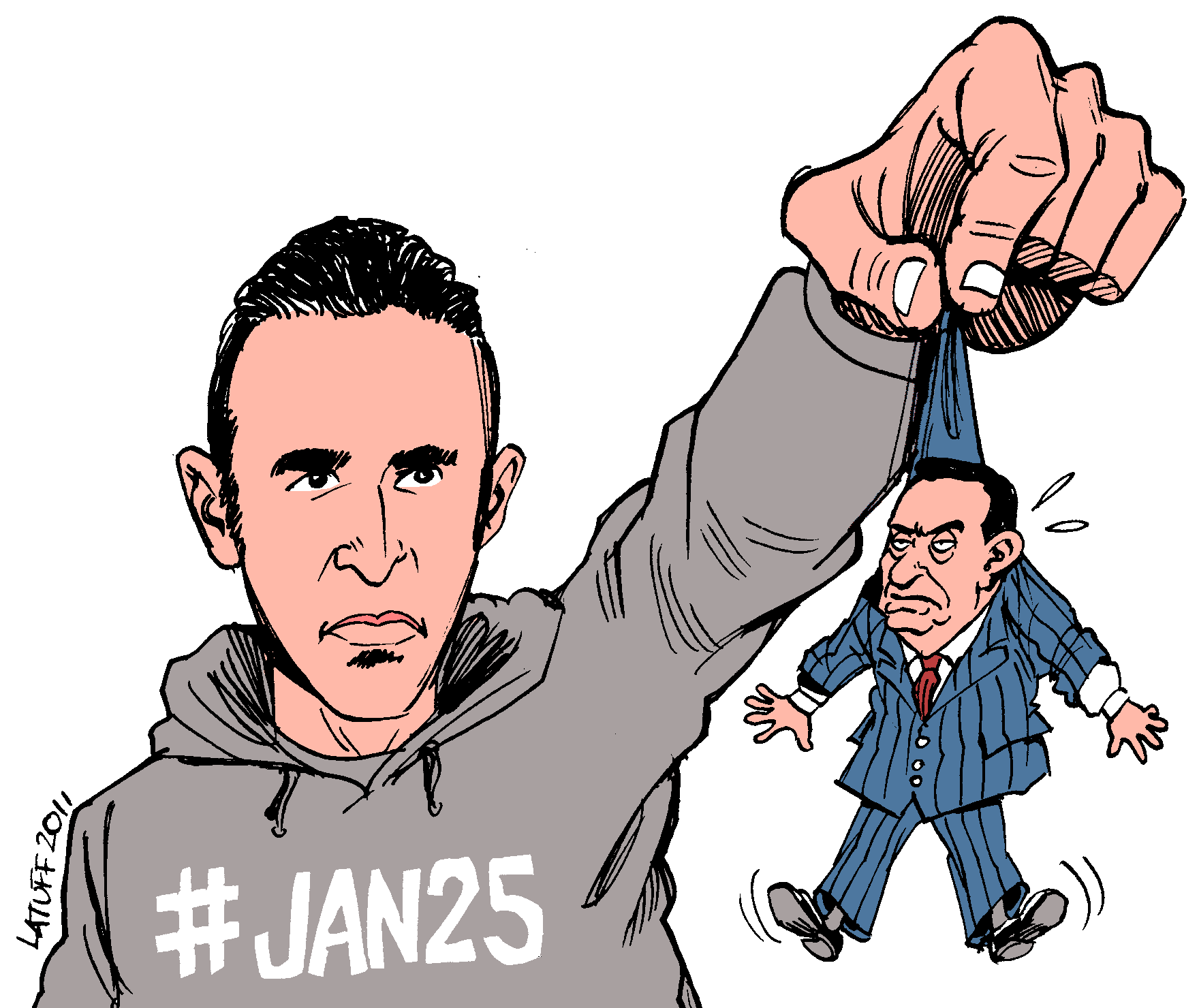
Political cartoon of Saeed and Hosni Mubarak by Carlos Latuff, published during the 2011 Egyptian revolution

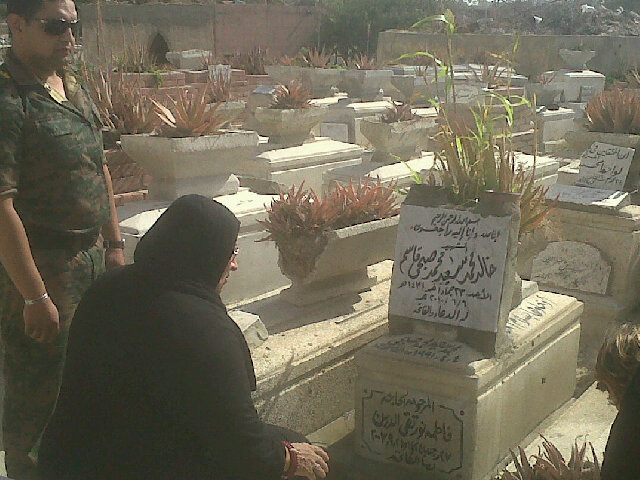
Saeed's mother visiting his grave

One of the earliest pre-revolution articles to link the death of Saeed to an imminent nationwide explosion came from Saeed's neighbor, Egyptian-Australian Amro Ali. In an opinion piece titled "Egypt's Collision Course with History", Ali writes an intimate portrayal of Saeed and the Alexandria context, as well as the ramifications of his death for the regime. Ali states "Saeed's tragedy is Egypt's tragedy. A young man, neither a political activist nor religious radical, but an ordinary Egyptian whose accused actions could not in any way warrant his lynching. Saeed was someone's son, someone's brother, someone's friend, someone's neighbour, someone's customer, and if not for what had happened, someone's future. Saeed was, in the local vernacular, a son of Cleopatra [Saeed's suburb]. Yet the system that was supposed to protect him and give him his rights, took away those rights by taking away his life... It is one extra nail in the coffin of the ever-widening gulf between the ruler and ruled... What the Egyptian establishment maybe forgetting... is that pigeons come home to roost more than once." Ali would later publish a personal and analytical account in Jadaliyya on the second anniversary of Saeed's death: "Saeeds of Revolution: De-Mythologizing Khaled Saeed". As well as analysing what really happened to Saeed, Ali also examines the dynamics of how Saeed was rapidly mythologized and the ramifications it has produced in Egyptian society.

While the actual impact of Ghonim's site cannot be determined, it was Ghonim who first published a call to protest on 25 January, to the followers of his blog, and protesters carried banners and posters displaying the photograph of Saaed's corpse. This has been named one of the catalysts of the 2011 Egyptian protests, as an instance in which people formed a community around opposition to police brutality and, by extension, other government abuses. On 11 February 2011, these protests resulted in the resignation of Hosni Mubarak after 30 years in power. ABC News characterized Saaed in his morgue photo as "The Face That Launched a Revolution". The Washington Post wrote that "Had it not been for a leaked morgue photo of his mangled corpse, tenacious relatives and the power of Facebook, the death of Khaled Said would have become a footnote in the annals of Egyptian police brutality. Instead, outrage over the beating death of the 28-year-old man in this coastal city last summer, and attempts by local authorities to cover it up, helped spark the mass protests demanding the ouster of Egyptian President Hosni Mubarak."

== Investigation and trial of the police officers ==
The investigation into Saeed's death yielded 300 papers, analysis and testimony which informed the decision to charge both police officers, Mahmoud Salah Mahmoud and Awad Ismael Suleiman, in criminal court with use of violence and unjustified detention of the victim. They were detained in July 2010 and the trial began that same month, but was then postponed until February 2011, at which point it was postponed again.

On 24 September 2011, Alexandria's criminal court adjourned the trial until 22 October 2011 as Judge Moussa al-Nahrawy decided to postpone the case to allow both the plaintiff's and the defendants' lawyers to review the report of a third forensic committee, whose formation the court had ordered in June 2011.

On 26 October 2011, both defendants were found guilty of manslaughter and were sentenced to seven years. Human rights activists, such as the Egyptian Organization for Human Rights, objected to the short sentences. The two officers were convicted of using excessive force which killed Saeed but were not convicted of the more serious charge of "torture with the purpose of killing" which is a capital crime. Organizations such as the April 6 Youth Movement and the 25 Revolution Youth Union also criticized the verdict for its leniency. The prosecution and defence both appealed the sentence and a retrial was ordered. On 3 March 2014, Alexandria criminal court increased the punishment by three years sentencing the two police officers to ten years in prison.

== See also ==
- Killing of Neda Agha-Soltan
- Killing of Hamza Ali al-Khateeb
- Death of Ali Jawad al-Sheikh
- Mohamed Bouazizi
