= Tahrir Academy =

Egyptian online learning platform

- Website type: Online learning platform
- Available in: Arabic
- Owner: Nabadat Foundation
- Founder: Wael Ghonim
- Commercial: No
- Registration: Optional
- Launched: February 2012
- Current status: Active

Tahrir Academy (Arabic: أكاديمية التحرير) is a non-profit online collaborative learning platform that aims to build the biggest Arabic video library to provide educational content to the 13- to 18-year-old Egyptian youth demographic

The website features more than 400 educational videos classified into courses in three main categories: Natural Sciences and well-being; which they name "Life", Human Sciences and Languages "Humans", and Mathematics and Technology "Numbers". The available courses cover subjects ranging from Physics, Astronomy, Arabic grammar, in addition to experiments for elementary and secondary school students which they don’t get the chance to actually perform these experiments in school.

During its first year, Tahrir Academy received more than 2.5 million views on YouTube through producing educational videos based on crowdsourcing knowledge from their pool of volunteers and experts. To date, Tahrir Academy received more than 4.5 million views, making them one of the top educational channels in MENA on YouTube.

== About ==
Tahrir Academy has been launched in February 2012, with a stated mission to "foster community-based learning by promoting a culture of knowledge-sharing through the power of the Internet"

Tahrir Academy is the main project of Nabadat Foundation "Pulses" in Arabic; "a nonprofit organization that fights poverty, improves education and increases political and human-rights awareness through utilizing technology and Internet". It is founded by Wael Ghonim, an Egyptian digital pioneer and internet activist, who is now the Chairman of Nabadat Foundation. Ghonim provided seed funding for Tahrir Academy through the revenues of his book "Revolution 2.0 – The Power of The People is greater than the people in power". Ghonim expresses his view on reforming education by saying :"Education in Egypt is not going to be solved by the government, it will be solved by generations who want to make a difference". Then adds his vision for Tahrir Academy "We hope by doing this [that] we contribute a bit to the whole view of education in Egypt"

== Crowdsourcing ==
In order to reach their mission of promoting "community-based learning" and the "culture of knowledge sharing" Tahrir Academy empowers a network of community clubs that depend on crowdsourcing.

The framework encourages bringing together different people from a wide variety of backgrounds, interests and skills who are interested in knowledge-sharing, and support them to pool their collective knowledge, skills and resources in order to create educational content. Tahrir Academy provides support in training, job shadowing, production, help in designing content and revising it. In addition Tahrir Academy promotes the educational videos through its online channels and offline activities in order to reach their target audience. Anyone who has experience that can be translated into knowledge can open a Tahrir Academy Club. Tahrir Academy helps clubs transform their material into interactive videos and topics range from "Rooftop planting Know How to History to Social Sciences and Maths. Anyone can participate in producing the videos (subject matter experts, film makers, scriptwriters".

During 2014 Tahrir Academy team working on scaling their production to reach 1,000 educational video in 2014, of which 50% are produced through managed crowdsourcing provided through "Tahrir Academy Clubs" initiative.
