= Center for Socialist Studies =

The Center for Socialist Studies (CSS) is an organizational center for the dissemination of socialist ideas and politics located in Giza, Egypt. It produces and sells left-wing theoretical books, magazines and newsletters as well as hosts public events and lectures on political issues. It receives no government or NGO funding, instead relying on financial contributions and donations from the center's members and supporters. It was founded by Kamal Khalil of the Revolutionary Socialists in the early 2000s.
