= Sameh Naguib =

Egyptian sociologist

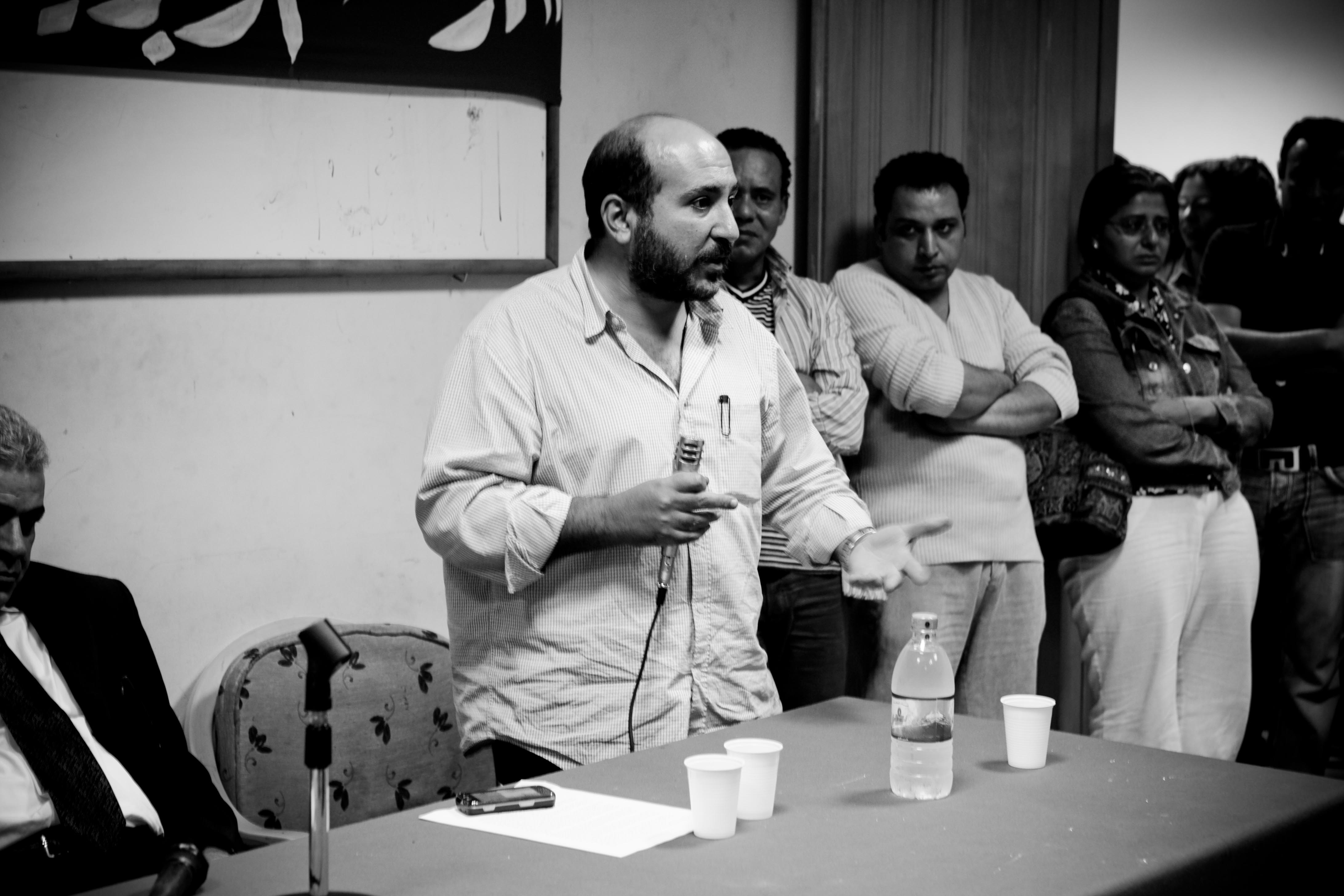
- Sameh Naguib (The one with the microphone)
- Employer: American University in Cairo

Sameh Naguib (Arabic: سامح نجيب, IPA: [ˈsæːmeħ næˈɡiːb]) is an Egyptian sociologist at the American University in Cairo, a socialist activist. In 2006 he published a short book analysing the history and growth of the Muslim Brotherhood titled The Muslim Brotherhood- A socialist viewpoint.

In 2007, Naguib was a speaker at the fifth Cairo Anti-war Conference, which he used as a platform to condemn former President Hosni Mubarak and pointed to Egypt's striking workers as a way forward for the movement:

[T]he struggle against Mubarak’s regime is just in its beginning and not end as the regime hopes. Despite the constitutional coup, passed by force and forgery, the Egyptian state terrorism will not intimidate us. Their laws and dictatorial constitution will not deter us from fighting for freedom and justice.

He is the author of several articles and a pamphlet, The Egyptian Revolution: A Political Analysis and Eyewitness Account (London: Bookmarks, 2011).

== See also ==
- Revolutionary Socialists
- The Egyptian Revolution: A Political Analysis and Eyewitness Account by Sameh Naguib (London: Bookmarks, 2011).
