= Revolutionary Socialists (Egypt) =

Revolutionary Socialists الاشتراكيون الثوريون al-ištirākiyyūn aṯ-ṯawriyyūn
- Leader: Collective leadership
- Founded: 1995
- Headquarters: Center for Socialist Studies, 7 Mourad Street, Giza Square, Giza, Egypt
- Newspaper: The Socialist
- Ideology: Communism; Revolutionary socialism Trotskyism; Feminism
- Political position: Far-left
- Colors: Red

Website
- http://revsoc.me/

The Revolutionary Socialists (Arabic: الاشتراكيون الثوريون; Egyptian Arabic: [elʔeʃteɾˤɑkejˈjiːn essæwɾejˈjiːn]) (RS) are a Trotskyist organisation in Egypt originating in the tradition of 'Socialism from Below'. Leading RS members include sociologist Sameh Naguib. The organisation produces a newspaper called The Socialist.

== History ==
The group began in the late 1980s among small circles of students influenced by Trotskyism. Adopting the current name by April 1995, the RS grew from a few active members, when the Egyptian left was very much underground, to a couple of hundred by the Second Palestinian Intifada. Despite not being able to freely organise under President Hosni Mubarak, the group's membership still increased due to their participation in the Palestinian solidarity movement. The intifada was seen to have a radicalising effect on Egyptian youth, which in turn helped to re-establish grassroots activism, which had long been repressed under the Mubarak regime.

The RS' relationship with the outlawed Muslim Brotherhood is also distinct from earlier leftist organisations in Egypt which held similar positions to that of the Egyptian Communist Party, which generally equated Islamism with fascism. The RS however, advanced the slogan "Sometimes with the Islamists, never with the state". The slogan was coined by Chris Harman of the Socialist Workers Party of Britain, in his book, The Prophet and the Proletariat, which was translated into Arabic, and widely distributed by the RS in 1997. The RS has thus been able to campaign alongside the Brotherhood at times, for example, during the pro-intifada and anti-war movements.

== Egyptian Revolution of 2011 ==
According to Mark LeVine, a professor of history at the University of California, the RS "played a crucial role organising Tahrir (during the Egyptian Revolution of 2011) and now in the workers movement" post-President Hosni Mubarak.

The RS claims to have, along with the rest of the Egyptian far-left and the April 6 Youth Movement, played a key role in mobilising for 25 January 2011, marking the first day of the Egyptian Revolution. The various forces previously met and developed strategies, such as demonstrating in different parts of Cairo simultaneously, before marching on Tahrir Square, to avoid a concentration of security forces.

The RS later issued a statement calling on Egyptian workers to instigate a general strike in the hope of finally ousting Mubarak:

The regime can afford to wait out the sit-ins and demonstrations for days and weeks, but it cannot last beyond a few hours if workers use strikes as a weapon. Strike on the railways, on public transport, the airports and large industrial companies! Egyptian workers, on behalf of the rebellious youth and on behalf of the blood of our martyrs, join the ranks of the revolution, use your power and victory will be ours!

Glory to the martyrs!
Down with the system!
All power to the people!
Victory to the revolution!

== Post-Mubarak ==
In the aftermath of Mubarak's resignation as president, the RS is calling for permanent revolution. On May Day 2011, they chanted "A workers’ revolution against the capitalist government", while marching to Tahrir Square. They argue that the working class, particularly of Cairo, Alexandria and Mansoura were the key players in ousting Mubarak, rather than the Egyptian youths' use of social networking sites, such as Facebook and Twitter, as has been widely reported. The RS sees the role of the Muslim Brotherhood post-Mubarak as "counter-revolutionary".

In March 2011, RS activist and journalist Hossam el-Hamalawy was among many protesters who stormed and seized offices of the State Security Investigations Service in Nasr City. The building had been used prior to the revolution to detain and torture many activists. El-Hamalawy was able to visit the cell where he had been imprisoned, later writing on his Twitter feed that he could not stop crying.

The RS calls for the dismantling of the ruling Military Council, the army and police force, and for Mubarak and his former regime, including Mohamed Hussein Tantawi and Sami Hafez Anan, (who currently form part of the Military Council) to stand trial. They oppose the decree-law that criminalises strikes, protests, demonstrations and sit-ins imposed by the council on 24 March 2011.

In July 2013, following the military coup against President Morsi, members of the Revolutionary Socialists participated in the Third Square, a movement created by liberal, leftist and moderate Islamist activists who reject both Muslim Brotherhood and military rule.

On 23 August 2013, the Revolutionary Socialists organised a demonstration at the High Court in Cairo, in protest against the release of former president Hosni Mubarak from prison. In a statement, they criticised that Mubarak had been acquitted from most of the charges against him, while the judiciary had no trouble issuing sentences against revolutionaries.

The Revolutionary Socialists joined with other movements in rejecting, opposing, and protesting against an anti-protest law passed by the Egyptian transitional government in 2013.

RS members, such as Haitham Mohamedain, participated in the founding of the Road of the Revolution Front organization and the Revolutionary Socialist movement been an important component of the Front.

The Revolutionary Socialists opposed the Egyptian Constitution of 2014 on the grounds that it would entrench military dominance of the political and judicial systems, solidify and perpetuate military trials of civilians, as well as provide inadequate protection for freedoms and labor rights.

== Positions on international issues ==
In 2006, Sameh Naguib - a leading RS member - labeled Hezbollah's conflict with Israel in the 2006 Lebanon War "a very important victory for the anti-war movement worldwide", claiming it prevented or delayed US and Israeli plans to attack Iran and Syria.

On 2 March 2011, during the US Wisconsin budget protests, the RS sent a message of solidarity to the US International Socialist Organization, urging them to build "a revolutionary socialist alternative" against "Zionism and imperialism".

The RS were amongst many socialists who condemned the Robert Mugabe regime of Zimbabwe for arresting and torturing activists, amongst who were members of Zimbabwe's International Socialist Organisation, for hosting a meeting discussing the revolutions in Tunisia and Egypt. They said "[t]he masses in Tunisia and Egypt have proven that no matter how long autocratic regimes last, the revolution's earthquake can break the walls and dams. Be sure that the earthquake is coming and that Mugabe will fall--".

On 20 March 2011, during the Libyan uprising, the RS condemned the UN Security Council, the European Union and the Obama administration on their decision to implement a no-fly zone and foreign military intervention in Libya as "part of the counter-revolution". They accused them of remaining silent "for decades while Gaddafi, and his like among the Arab regimes, suppressed their people with the utmost brutality and piled up wealth... so long as these regimes implemented the recommendations of the International Monetary Fund for the abolition of any social support for the poor... as long as companies kept open their doors to global capitalism...".

== See also ==
- Socialism
- Marxism
- Trotskyism
- List of Trotskyist internationals
- Tony Cliff
- Workers' council
