= Parliament of Egypt =

Bicameral legislature of Egypt

Coordinates: 30°02′25″N 31°14′12″E

- Emblem of Egypt

Type
- Type: Bicameral
- Houses: • Senate • House of Representatives
- Established: 25 November 1866

Leadership
- President of the Senate: Essam El-Din Farid
- Speaker of the House: Hisham Badawy

Structure
- Seats: 596 Members of the Egyptian House of Representatives (First Chamber of Parliament); 300 Members of the Egyptian Senate (Second Chamber of Parliament)
- Political groups: Government (Madbouly Cabinet) (447): Nation's Future (231); Homeland Defenders (91); National Front (70); Republican People’s (28); New Wafd (12); Al-Nour (6); Congress (4); Will of a Generation (2); Freedom (2); Consciousness (1); Opposition (149): Social Democratic (12); Reform and Development (11); Justice (11); Tagammu (5); Conservative (1); Independents (109)
- Political groups: Government (Madbouly Cabinet) (269): NFP (118); HDP (72); National Front (45); RPP (14); Wafd (6); Congress (3); Freedom (2); ِAl-Nour (2); Eradet Geel (1); ِFEP (1); ِREP (1); ِSadat (1); ADNP (1); DGP (1); Wa'i (1); Opposition (20): ESDP (7); RDP (5); Justice (5); Tagammu (3); Independents (11)

Elections
- Last election: 2025 Egyptian parliamentary election
- Last election: 2025 Egyptian Senate election
- Next election: 2030 Egyptian parliamentary election
- Next election: 2030 Egyptian Senate election

Meeting place
- People's Assembly chamber of the Egyptian Parliament building, New Administrative Capital, Egypt

Website
- http://www.parliament.gov.eg

The Parliament of Egypt is the supreme legislative body of the Arab Republic of Egypt. The parliament is bicameral, with the Senate functioning as the upper house and the House of Representatives as the lower house.

The Parliament is located in New Capital, Egypt's capital. Under the country's 2014 constitution, as the legislative branch of the Egyptian state, the Parliament enacted laws, approved the general policy of the State, the general plan for economic and social development and the general budget of the State, supervised the work of the government, and had the power to vote to impeach the President of the Republic, or replace the government and its Prime Minister by a vote of no-confidence.

The parliament is made up of 596 seats, with 448 seats elected through the individual candidacy system, 120 elected through winner-take-all party lists (with quotas for youth, women, Christians, and workers) and 28 selected by the president. It is the seventh-largest legislative chamber in the world behind China's National People's Congress and the largest parliamentary body in the Arab world.

== History and composition ==
Egypt is known for beginning the earliest administrative and legislative codes in history. Throughout its history, formidable human cultures and civilizations offered the most advanced form of governance and management. The Egyptian Civilization laid the groundwork of governance and management. The Pharaoh, on top of the state hierarchy, appointed high-ranking government officials. A viable system of government has been in force ever since the third and fourth dynasties, several codes were unleashed; some were related to limited working hours of peasants while others combatted forced labor and other tiring jobs.

Parliamentary life began in Modern Egypt as early as 1866, and since then several forms of national assemblies have been formed, dismantled, and amended to reach the present-day form. Since 1866, Egypt witnessed seven parliamentary systems whose legislative and oversight competencies varied and reflected the history of the Egyptian people's struggle to establish a society based on democracy and freedom. For more than 135 years of parliamentary history, Egypt witnessed 32 Parliaments whose members ranged between 75 and 458 who contributed to writing Egypt's modern political social, economic, and cultural history. According to the present-day constitution, the Parliament consists only of the House of Representatives ("Maǧlis an-Nowwab"), a 596-member lower house.

=== Suspension of Parliament ===
Egypt was without a parliament for three years. The parliament was dissolved in June 2012. On 8 July 2012, President Mohamed Morsi said he would override the edict that had dissolved the country's elected lawmakers, but that was followed by his deposition. Elections for parliament were held from 17 October 2015 to 2 December 2015.

== Organization and powers ==
=== Organization ===
==== Formation of the House ====
The 2014 constitution that was passed in the 2014 constitutional referendum has put into place the following rules: the House that is elected following the ratification of the constitution must have at least 450 members. In addition, prospective members must be Egyptian, must be at least 25 years old and must hold an education certificate. Also, the president can appoint, at the most, five percent of the members in the chamber.

The House sits for a five-year term but can be dissolved earlier by the president. All seats are voted on in each election. The House of Representatives members are elected by absolute majority of legitimate votes cast.

The House may demand the resignation of the cabinet by adopting a motion of censure. For this reason, the Prime Minister of Egypt and his cabinet are necessarily from the dominant party or coalition in the House. When the president and house come from opposing parties (a situation which did arise historically, but not since the 1970s), this would lead to the situation known as cohabitation.

=== Powers ===
The House of Representatives has various competences stated in Chapter Five of the Constitution. According to article 86 the House of Representatives shall undertake:

- Legislation
- Review and approval of agreements and treaties
- Review and approval of the State plan and budget
- Discussion of the president of the Republic's statement and the government program
- Amendments to the Constitution
- Approval of declarations of war and emergency

In practice, the People's Assembly had very little power prior to the 2011 Egyptian revolution. It was dominated by the National Democratic Party, and there was little substantive opposition to executive decisions.

=== House of Representatives organization ===
==== Speaker of the House ====
The House of Representatives Speaker (HR Speaker) presides over the House and is elected from the House membership, along with two deputies during the first session of the season. The Speaker's role in session is to keep the peace and order to the parliamentary session, take part in discussion provided that he gives up his presidency to one of his deputies and doesn't return to his presidency until the discussion is finished as well as ordering an emergency session for one of the House' committees. In case of vacancy in the president's office, the Speaker serves as acting president until the presidential elections are held (Which must be within 60 days). This has happened once, when president Anwar Sadat was assassinated in office, and then People's Assembly Speaker, Sufi Abu Taleb served as acting president. The last PA Speaker was Saad Al Katatny, who briefly presided the Assembly for only 5 months from 23 January 2012 to the dissolution of parliament on 18 June 2012.

==== Speaker's Staff Office ====
The Staff is responsible for organization of the house' and its committees' agendas, the enforcement of the House' orders and is the link between the House and different agencies, ministries and other authorities. The staff consists of the HR speaker and his two deputies.

==== House' General Committee ====
This committee is formed in the beginning of the House' annual season, headed by the Speaker. Its membership includes the Deputy Speakers, representatives of the political parties' parliamentary committees, and five House members (of whom one is an independent, if there are more than ten independents). The Speaker is responsible for outlining the committee's agenda. The committee is responsible for discussing the general issues put forward by the president, the prime minister or the speaker.

==== Specialized Committees ====
These committees are:

- Media, Culture and Antiquities committee
- Industry Committee
- Social Solidarity committee
- African Affairs committee
- Manpower committee
- Housing committee
- Transport committee
- Economic Affairs Committee
- Defence and national security committee
- Arab Affairs Committee
- Legislative and Constitutional Affairs committee
- Human Rights committee
- Youth and Sports committee
- Agriculture committee
- Local Administration committee
- Complaints and Proposals Committee
- Education Committee
- Health Committee
- Telecommunications Committee
- Budget and Planning Committee
- Foreign Affairs Committee
- Middle and Small-Scale Enterprises committee
- Tourism committee

==== Ethics Committee ====
This committee is formed in the beginning of the House' annual season, headed by one of the HR speaker deputies. The membership includes the heads of the following committees: Constitutional Affairs and Legislation; Religious, Social and Awkaf Affairs; and Suggestions and Grievances; five members of the General Committee (of whom at least two are from the opposition parties); and five members chosen randomly from the House. This committee is responsible for looking into the violations committed by House members towards the Egyptian society's code of behavior towards religion, social standards, etc.

==== Ad hoc and combined committees ====
The ad hoc committees are formed by the suggestion of the Speaker or the request of the government to study, debate on a new bill or law, voting on the ratification of a new law or bill or a special issue of concern. The Speaker is responsible on choosing members for this committee. The Combined committees are formed by the request of the Speaker, the government, members of two or more of the specialized committees, with the aim of studying a particular issue of concern. These combined committees are headed by one of the Speaker's deputies. The orders of these committees are issued when a majority vote is achieved.

==== Parliamentary Chapter ====
The Egyptian House of Representatives is the Egyptian representative of the international parliamentary conventions. This chapter aims at developing of mutual relations with international parliaments. The General Assembly of this chapter consists of the entire membership of the House, and headed by the Speaker. The executive committee of this chapter of the Speaker staff office, three members chosen from the Assembly membership of whom at least one is a member of the opposition parties. The Assembly meets in its chapter form every January. Emergency sessions are held by the request of the executive committee to look into any of additionally outlined issues of concern.

== Election and campaigning ==
=== Campaigning ===
==== Upper Egypt ====
While parliamentary elections in the major cities are often fixed by the ruling party, elections in Upper Egypt—the poorest and most underdeveloped part of the country where approximately 40% of Egypt's population live—are more free, with the ruling party "recruiting whoever happened to win." According to journalist Peter Hessler, neglect of Upper Egypt has also allowed the region to "devise indigenous campaign traditions".

Without parties or local media to promote issues or policies, campaigns consist primarily of evening house calls to potential voters by candidates with their entourage. Visits may last anywhere from only a minute to a half an hour. Candidates are served cigarettes, (non-alcoholic) drinks or sweets; The visits are not confined to a period before the election but often continue even when the parliament is cancelled and elections continually delayed.

Because family hierarchies dominate most people's lives, candidates seek the support of clan elders who direct family members, sometimes numbering in the hundreds, how to vote. Candidates may successfully campaign without the "support of any party or other institution" because there are no party networks. They do campaign with family members and when defeated candidates lose face because elections are a matter of family pride.

Candidates often have no platform, do not talk "about issues, policies, or potential legislation", or make any "public campaign promises". Candidates often sit in silence on their visits rather than formally introduce themselves, give a stump speech or field questions about what they will do if elected. Potential voters will however often ask for small favors such as making a call to a government office that issued permits or handled utilities on the voter's behalf if the candidate is elected.

Campaigning involves male Muslims, as candidates seldom if ever interact with women (who in the south are sequestered at home and sometimes forbidden from voting by the clan elder), and the ten percent Coptic Christian minority is "basically ignored" by "most" candidates.

== See also ==
- History of the Egyptian parliament
- 2025 Egyptian parliamentary election
- Politics of Egypt
- List of legislatures by country
- Speaker of the House of Representatives (Egypt)
  - List of speakers of the House of Representatives (Egypt)
