= Politics of Egypt =

Politics of the Republic of Egypt السياسه فى مصر
- National emblem of Egypt
- Polity type: Unitary Semi Presidential state constitutional republic
- Constitution: Constitution of Egypt
- Formation: 18 June 1953

Legislative branch
- Name: Parliament
- Type: Bicameral
- Upper house
- Name: Senate
- Presiding officer: Speaker of the Senate
- Lower house
- Name: House of Representatives
- Presiding officer: Speaker of the House

Executive branch
- Head of state
- Appointer: Direct popular vote (two rounds if necessary)
- Head of government
- Appointer: President of the Republic
- Head of state and government
- Currently: President of the Republic
- Cabinet
- Name: Cabinet of Egypt
- Leader: Prime Minister
- Appointer: President of the Republic
- Headquarters: Government District

Judicial branch
- Name: Judiciary of Egypt
- Supreme Constitutional Court

Auditory branch
- Name: Central Auditing Organization

The politics of Egypt take place within the framework of a republican semi-presidential system of government. In the current system, the president is elected for a six-year term. Following the 2020 elections to the new Senate, the legislature became bicameral, with the House of Representatives as the lower house. The Egyptian government is led administratively by the prime minister.

The politics of Egypt have been shaped by the presidency of Abdel Fattah el-Sisi since he assumed office in 2014. Some scholars, media outlets, and human rights organizations have described Egypt's political system under el-Sisi as authoritarian, citing restrictions on political freedoms, civil liberties, and opposition activity. With the exception of the 2012 Egyptian presidential election after the Egyptian Revolution, elections in Egypt have been subject to criticism from some observers and organizations regarding electoral competitiveness and political conditions. Under el-Sisi, political freedoms and opposition activity have been the subject of criticism by human rights groups and other observers, who have reported restrictions on political participation and dissent. The current political system was established following the 2013 Egyptian military coup d'état, and the assumption of office by President Abdel Fattah el-Sisi.

== Executive branch ==
=== Presidency ===
The position was created after the Egyptian Revolution of 1952, with Mohammed Naguib serving as the first to hold office. Before 2005, Parliament chose a candidate for the presidency and people voted in a referendum to approve or reject the proposed candidate. Following the Egyptian Revolution of 2011, a new presidential election was held in 2012; this was the first free and fair election in Egypt's political history. The Muslim Brotherhood declared on 18 June 2012, that its candidate, Mohamed Morsi, had won. Following a wave of public discontent with the autocratic excesses of the Morsi government; the beginning of July 2013 marked the onset of the 2013 Egyptian coup d'état. This followed the decision of General Abdel Fattah el-Sisi to remove Morsi from office and suspend the 2012 constitution. El-Sisi was then elected head of state in the 2014 presidential election. He was officially sworn in as Egypt's new president on 8 June 2014.

Article 133 of Egyptian Constitution of 2012 originally determined a 4-year period of presidential mandate, to which the candidate could only be re-elected once. According to that document, to be eligible for presidency, the candidate must be "Egyptian born to Egyptian parents, must have carried no other citizenship, must have civil and political rights, cannot be married to a non-Egyptian," and not be younger than 40 Gregorian years.

Article 146 declares the president to be the Supreme Commander of the Armed Forces. However, to declare war or to send armed forces outside state territory, the president must consult the National Defense Council and have the approval of the majority of the MPs. In April 2019, Egypt's parliament extended the presidential term from four years to six years. Following a constitutional referendum on April 20-22, 2019, with overseas voting between 19 and 21 April, amendments allowed President Abdel Fattah el-Sisi to remain in power until 2030, whereas under the previous constitution, he could not contend in the 2022 elections. The changes were approved by 88.83% of voters who voted, with a 44% turnout.

=== Cabinet ===
Cabinet of Egypt (the Council of Ministers) serves as the country's chief executive and administrative body under the leadership of the Prime Minister Mostafa Madbouly, who has held the office since June 2018. The cabinet underwent a major reshuffle in February 2026, involving 22 nominations aimed at addressing economic challenges and industrial localization.

The current structure of the cabinet includes Prime Minister Mostafa Madbouly and Deputy Prime Minister for Economic Affairs Hussein Ahmed Issa. Several major portfolios were consolidated in 2024 and 2026 to enhance efficiency, such as: the Foreign Affairs, International Cooperation, and Egyptian Expatriates, led by Badr Abdelatty. The Local Development and Environment is led by Manal Awad. The Investment and Foreign Trade is established as a new standalone ministry under Mohamed Farid Saleh.

== Legislative branch ==
Parliament meets for one eight-month session each year; under special circumstances, the President of Egypt can call an additional session. Even though the powers of the Parliament have increased since the 1980 Amendments of the Constitution, the Parliament continues to lack the powers to balance the extensive powers of the President.

=== The House of Representatives (Maglis El Nowwab) ===
The Egyptian House of Representatives is the principal legislative body. It consists of a maximum 596 representatives of whom 448 are directly elected through FPTP and another 120 elected through proportional representation in 4 nationwide districts while the President can appoint up to 28. The House sits for a five-year term but can be dissolved earlier by the President.

The Constitution stipulates a majority of the House may force the resignation of the executive cabinet by voting a motion of censure. For this reason, the Prime Minister and his cabinet are necessarily from the dominant party or coalition in the assembly. In the case of a president and house from opposing parties, this leads to the situation known as cohabitation.

The recent elections were held in 2015, 2020 and most recently in 2025.

=== Senate (Magles El Shiyoukh) ===
The Egyptian Senate was a 264-member upper house of Parliament created in 1980. In the Senate, 176 members were directly elected and 88 members were appointed by the President of the Republic for six-year terms. One-half of the Senate was renewed every three years.

The Senate's legislative powers were limited. On most matters of legislation, the People's Assembly retained the last word in the event of a disagreement between the two houses.

It was called the Shura Council, which was abolished in the 2014 constitution, only to be reinstated in the amendments of 2019.

=== Parliamentary Elections ===
There are numerous political parties in Egypt, exceeding 100 in number. The formation of political parties based on religion, race or gender is prohibited by the Constitution. Before the revolution in 2011, power was concentrated in the hands of the President of the Republic and the National Democratic Party which retained a super-majority in the People's Assembly.

Many new political parties, most of which were fragile, formed in anticipation of running candidates in the 2011–12 Egyptian parliamentary election, which was considered the first free election since the 1952 revolution. However, the elected Parliament was dissolved by the constitutional court and new elections were held in 2015.

Below the national level, authority is exercised by and through governors and mayors appointed by the central government as popularly elected local councils have remained suspended since 2011.

== Judicial branch ==
Egypt's judicial branch is an independent, specialized body comprising ordinary courts, administrative courts (Council of State), and specialized courts, with the Supreme Constitutional Court as the highest authority. Judges are independent, immune to dismissal, and manage their own affairs through the Supreme Council of the Judiciary.

Key Components of the Egyptian Judiciary include the Supreme Constitutional Court, which is the highest judicial body in Egypt, responsible for determining the constitutionality of laws, regulations, and resolving jurisdictional disputes between judicial bodies. The Ordinary Courts (Common Courts) is a three-tier system handling civil and criminal matters; Courts of First Instance, Court of Appeal and the Court of Cassation, which is the highest court in the ordinary system.

The Council of State (Administrative Judiciary) is an independent judicial body handling administrative disputes, disciplinary appeals, and reviewing government contracts. Public Prosecution is an integral part of the judiciary that conducts investigations and criminal prosecutions. The Egyptian Military Justice includes specialized courts handling cases related to military personnel or equipment.

Supreme Council of the Judiciary manages the administrative affairs of the ordinary judiciary, ensuring independence, and the Egyptian State Lawsuits Authority represents the state in lawsuits. As for the Administrative Prosecution, it investigates financial and administrative violations within public entities.

Constitution of Egypt dictates that judges are independent and subject only to the law. The system combines elements of civil law, heavily influenced by the Napoleonic Code, and Islamic law. The judiciary is considered an autonomous authority with the responsibility of upholding rights and freedoms.

== Political parties and elections ==
According to the Egyptian Constitution, political parties are allowed to exist. Religious political parties are not allowed as it would not respect the principle of non-interference of religion in politics and that religion has to remain in the private sphere to respect all beliefs. Also forbidden are political parties supporting militia formations or having an agenda that is contradictory to the constitution and its principles, or threatening the country's stability such as national unity between Muslim Egyptians and Christian Egyptians.

As of 2015, there were more than 100 registered political parties in Egypt. The largest were the Free Egyptians Party, New Wafd Party, Conference Party, and the Egyptian Social Democratic Party.

In December 2020, final results of the parliamentary election confirmed a clear majority of the seats for Egypt's Nation's Future Party (Mostaqbal Watn), which strongly supports President El-Sisi. The party has increased its majority, partly because of new electoral rules.

== Civil society ==
Egyptians had lived under emergency law from 1967 until 31 May 2012 (with one 18-month break starting in 1980). Emergency laws have been extended every three years since 1981. These laws sharply circumscribed any non-governmental political activity: street demonstrations, non-approved political organizations, and unregistered financial donations were formally banned. However, since 2000, these restrictions have been violated in practice. In 2003, the agenda shifted heavily towards local democratic reforms, opposition to the succession of Gamal Mubarak as president, and rejection of violence by state security forces. Groups involved in the latest wave include PCSPI, the Egyptian Movement for Change (Kefaya), and the Association for Egyptian Mothers.

Substantial peasant activism exists on a variety of issues, especially related to land rights and land reform. A major turning point was the 1997 repeal of Nasser-era land reform policies under pressure for structural adjustment. A pole for this activity is the Land Center for Human Rights.

The Egyptian Revolution of 2011, inspired by the recent revolution in Tunisia, forced the resignation of President Mubarak and the Military Junta that succeeded him abrogated the Constitution and promised free and fair elections under a new one. On 15 August 2015, President al-Sisi enacted a new Counter-Terrorism Law, which Human Rights Watch claims "mimics" language "already contained in Egypt's decades-old Emergency Law". In Article 2, one of many references include terrorism as "any use of intimidation for the purpose of disturbing public order; harms national unity, social peace, or national security". Following to Section 2, the President "may issue a decree to take appropriate measures to maintain security and public order", addressed in Article 53. This includes "the power to order six-month curfews or evacuations in defined areas, subject to a majority vote in parliament within seven days, or cabinet approval if parliament is not in session."

== Political pressure ==
Before the revolution, Mubarak tolerated limited political activity by the Brotherhood for his first two terms, then moved more aggressively to block its influence. Trade unions and professional associations are officially sanctioned. In 2014, in Upper Egypt, several newspapers reported that the region of Upper Egypt wants to secede from Egypt to try to improve living standards. The main political issues in Egypt were cost of living, unemployment, poverty, housing and health care according to a 2026 Arab Barometer poll.

== Foreign relations ==
The permanent headquarters for the League of Arab States (The Arab League) is located in Cairo. The Secretary-General of the League has traditionally been an Egyptian. Former Egyptian Foreign Minister Ahmed Abu El Ghet is the present Secretary-General of the Arab League. The Arab League moved out of Egypt to Tunis in 1978 as a protest at the peace treaty with Israel but returned in 1989.

Egypt was the first Arab state to establish diplomatic relations with the state of Israel, after the signing of the Egypt–Israel peace treaty at the Camp David Accords. Egypt has a major influence amongst other Arab states, and has historically played an important role as a mediator in resolving disputes between various Arab nations, and in the Israeli–Palestinian dispute. Most Arab nations still give credence to Egypt playing that role, though its effects are often limited.

Former Egyptian Deputy Prime Minister Boutros Boutros-Ghali served as Secretary General of the United Nations from 1991 to 1996.

A territorial dispute with Sudan over an area known as the Hala'ib Triangle has meant that diplomatic relations between the two remain strained.

== See also ==
- Censorship in Egypt
