= 2025 Egyptian Senate election =

- 4–5 August 2025 (first round); 27–28 August 2025 (second round)
- 200 of the 300 seats in the Senate; 101 seats needed for a majority
Party	Leader	Seats	+/–
NFP	Abdel-Wahab Abdel-Razeq	104	−45
HDP	Ahmed El Awadi	44	+33
National Front Party	Assem el Gazzar	22	New
RPP	Hazem Omar	10	−7
ESDP	Farid Zahran	5	+2
RDP	Mohamed Anwar Sadat	4	+1
Justice	Abdel-Moneim Imam	4	+3
Wafd	Abdel-Sanad Yamama	2	−8
Tagammu	Sayed Abdel Aal	2	−2
Eradet Geel Party	Tayseer Mata	1	0
Freedom	Mamdouh Hassan	1	0
Congress	Omar El-Mokhtar Semeida	1	−2
This lists parties that won seats. See the complete results below.
President of the Senate before	President of the Senate after
Abdel-Wahab Abdel-Razeq; NFP	Essam El-Din Farid; NFP

Senate elections were held in Egypt between 4 and 5 August 2025, with Egyptian expatriates voting between 1 and 2 August. Run-offs took place from 27–28 August. Results were announced by the National Elections Authority (NEA) on 12 August 2025.

== Background ==
The election took place five years after the 2020 Egyptian Senate election, as required by the constitution. The Senate was re‑established following the 2019 Egyptian constitutional referendum, replacing the Shura Council which was abolished in 2014.

The poll was held amid economic challenges, including high inflation and currency devaluation, alongside continued restrictions on political opposition. Several opposition and independent groups alleged unequal campaigning conditions and chose not to field candidates.

== Dates ==
The first round of the election was held from 1–2 August overseas and from 4–5 August in the country.

Run offs took place in late August.

== Electoral system ==
The Senate has 300 members, with 100 appointed by the president. 200 are voted on via a mixed electoral system; 100 were elected via individual constituencies, the other 100 were elected via a closed list proportional system.

The NEA confirmed on 18 July 2025 that 428 candidates would contest the single‑member seats, "including 186 independents" and 242 party members. The deadline for withdrawals was 20 July.

== Parties ==
=== Contesting ===
The National Unified List for Egypt continued negotiations for seat allotments in late June, with the Nation's Future Party expected to receive the most seats, followed by the Homeland Defenders Party, National Front, and the Republican People's Party. The New Wafd Party was anticipated to receive very few seats.

The National Unified List was the only list confirmed to run for the party list seats. The list included the Nation's Future Party (which ran the largest share of candidates, at 44), Homeland Defenders Party (19), National Front Party (12), the Republican People's Party (three) and parties aligned with the opposition, including the Egyptian Wafd Party, Tagammu, the Egyptian Social Democratic Party, and the Justice Party.

Numerous parties in the alliance also ran for individual seats, including the Nation's Future Party, Homeland Defenders, Justice Party, National Front and the Republican People's Party. The Egyptian Social Democratic Party fielded "35 candidates" for individual seats, while the Will of a Generation Party ran "33 candidates", the Union Party with 30 candidates, and the Al-Ahrar Party ran a total of 28 candidates, while the Tagammu Party had 27 candidates. The Democratic Generation Party ran "25 candidates", with the Egyptian Freedom Party running 24. The Arab Democratic Nasserist Party had 18 candidates, the Congress Party had 17, and the New Independent Party ran 15 while the Al-Nour Party had 12, the Consciousness Party had 11, and the New Wafd Party listed 10 candidates.

=== Boycotts ===
- Civil Democratic Movement

== Conduct ==
Zawia3 confirmed that in Sohag Governorate, people affiliated with individual candidates were seen distributing coupons which were exchangeable for food, once people had voted.

== Results ==
Since the National List for the Sake of Egypt was unopposed in the list constituencies and surpassed the 5% vote threshold, the NEA awarded it all 100 list seats automatically. Five of the 100 constituency seats went to a second round.

Party or alliance		Proportional			Constituency (first round)			Constituency (second round)			Total seats
Party or alliance		Votes	%	Seats	Votes	%	Seats	Votes	%	Seats	Total seats
National List for the Sake of Egypt	Nation's Future Party	11,490,263	98.03	44			58			2	104
National List for the Sake of Egypt	Homeland Defenders Party	11,490,263	98.03	19			23			2	44
National List for the Sake of Egypt	National Front Party	11,490,263	98.03	12			9			1	22
National List for the Sake of Egypt	Republican People's Party	11,490,263	98.03	5			5				10
National List for the Sake of Egypt	Egyptian Social Democratic Party	11,490,263	98.03	5			0				5
National List for the Sake of Egypt	Reform and Development Party	11,490,263	98.03	4			0				4
National List for the Sake of Egypt	Justice Party	11,490,263	98.03	4			0				4
National List for the Sake of Egypt	Egyptian Wafd Party	11,490,263	98.03	2			0				2
National List for the Sake of Egypt	National Progressive Unionist Rally Party	11,490,263	98.03	2			0				2
National List for the Sake of Egypt	Eradet Geel Party	11,490,263	98.03	1			0				1
National List for the Sake of Egypt	Egyptian Freedom Party	11,490,263	98.03	1			0				1
National List for the Sake of Egypt	Egyptian Congress Party	11,490,263	98.03	1			0				1
National List for the Sake of Egypt	Total	11,490,263	98.03	100			95			5	200
Consciousness Party							0			0	0
New Independent Party							0			0	0
Al-Nour Party							0				0
Independents							0			0	0
Against		231,398	1.97	–							–
Appointed members											100
Total		11,721,661	100.00	100			95			5	300
Valid votes		11,721,661	98.95								
Invalid/blank votes		124,572	1.05								
Total votes		11,846,233	100.00								
Registered voters/turnout		69,333,318	17.09								
Source: Ahram, Anadolu Agency, Dostor, Safha, Al Manassa

== Aftermath ==
President el-Sisi appointed 100 members in October 2025, including political figures Abdel-Sanad Yamama, Hazem Omar and Essam Khalil. The president retained nine of the senators who he had previously appointed in 2020.
