= 2025 Egyptian parliamentary election =

- 10–11 November 2025 (first round); 24–25 November 2025 (second round)
- 568 of the 596 seats in the House of Representatives; 298 seats needed for a majority
Party	Leader	Seats	+/–
Nation's Future	Abdel-Wahab Abdel-Razeq	227	−89
Homeland Defenders	Galal Haridy	86	+63
National Front	Assem el Gazzar	65	New
Republican People's	Hazem Omar	25	−25
Justice	Abdel-Moneim Imam	11	+9
Social Democratic	Farid Zahran	11	+4
New Wafd	Bahaa El-Din Abu Shoka	9	−16
Reform & Development	Mohamed Anwar Esmat Sadat	9	0
Al-Nour	Yunis Makhyun	6	−1
Tagammu	Sayed Abdel Aal	5	−1
Congress	Omar El-Mokhtar Semeida	4	−3
Freedom	Mamdouh Hassan	2	−5
Consciousness	Mahmoud Taher	1	New
Conservative	Akmal Kortam	1	New
Eradet Geel	Taysir Matar	1	−1
Independents	–	105	+12
This lists parties that won seats. See the complete results below.
Prime Minister before	Prime Minister after
Mostafa Madbouly; Independent	Mostafa Madbouly; Independent

Parliamentary elections were held in Egypt for 17 governorates from 10 to 11 November 2025, while the remainder of the governorates held elections from 24 to 25 November 2025, with first-phase runoffs held from 3–4 December. Second-phase runoffs were held from 17 to 18 December. Annulments of 50 constituencies occurred because of electoral violations, with those elections being redone later in the month and in January 2026.

== Electoral system ==
The Nation's Future Party (NFP), the Homeland Defenders Party (HDP), the Republican People's Party (RPP), and the Conference Party spoke in favor of the closed list system during a national dialogue held in 2023, while other parties, including the Tagammu Party, the National Accord Party, the Reform and Development Party, the Al-Nour Party, and the Justice Party, preferred a proportional representation system.

The parliament approved an electoral law in May 2025 which created a mixed system; the NFP, the RPP, HDP, Modern Egypt Party, and the Coordination Committee of Parties’ Youth Leaders and Politicians were among the parties that supported it.

The seats in parliament consist of 284 individual seats and 284 closed party list seats, with 28 additionally appointed by the president. The law marks out 143 constituencies for individual seats and four constituencies for party lists. The party list constituencies include "Cairo and the Middle and South Delta" and "North, Middle and South Upper Egypt", which each represent 102 seats. The "Eastern Nile Delta" and "Alexandria and the Western Delta" both represent 40 seats.

Party lists contain quotas, with each list required to have 51 women, three Christians, two candidates for "workers and farmers", two for "young people", and one each set aside for the "physically disabled" and expatriates.

== Dates ==
Voting for overseas residents was held from 7 to 8 November.

The first phase in Egypt began on 10 November 2025 and lasted until the next day; it included the Giza, Fayoum, Beni Suef, Minya, Assiut, New Valley, Sohag, Qena, Luxor, Aswan, Red Sea, Alexandria, Beheira, and Matrouh governorates.

A second round of voting in Egypt began on 24 November and continues until 25 November in Cairo, Dakahlia, Damietta, Gharbia, Ismailia, Kafr El Sheikh, Monufia, North Sinai, Port Said, Qalyubiyya, Sharqia, South Sinai, and Suez Governorates. Around 5,606 polling stations were set up. Overseas voting for run off elections for the second phase took place beginning on 15 December until 16 December. Voting in the country began on 17 December and lasted until 18 December.

The election was the longest parliamentary election in Egyptian history, taking over three months because of various annulments of election results.

== Parties ==
The Egyptian Social Democratic Party, Justice Party, and the Reform and Development Party agreed in February 2025 to join a proposed unified list, headed by the Nation's Future Party.

The parties that competed as part of the National Unified List for Egypt included the Nation's Future Party, National Front, the Homeland Defenders Party, the Republican People's Party, the New Wafd Party, the Tagammu Party, the Egyptian Social Democratic Party, the Justice Party, the Reform and Development Party, the Will of a Generation Party, the Egyptian Freedom Party, the Conference Party, and the Coordination Committee for Parties’ Youth.

The Egyptian Social Democratic Party, the Justice Party, and the Reform and Development Party (which were part of the Civil Democratic Movement) formed the Democratic Path Alliance in May to contest individual seats ahead of the 2025 Egyptian Senate election and this election, in addition to allying with the National Unified List.

The Reform and Renaissance Party ran in the election.

The Modern Egypt Party ran candidates.

The Constitution Party and the Conservative Party allied and ran for individual seats, in an alliance known as the Free Path Alliance, which is also translated as the Free Road Alliance.

Various leftist parties who are part of the Civil Democratic Movement, including the Socialist Popular Alliance Party, the Egyptian Socialist Party, the Dignity Party, and the Bread and Freedom Party, formed the Social Justice Alliance ahead of the election. The alliance is also known as the People's Right coalition and also includes the Egyptian Communist Party, the National Social Accord Party, the Hope Current, Revolutionary Socialists, and the Democratic Front Party.

Four coalitions ("Popular List, the Your Voice for Egypt List, the Call of Egypt List, and the Generation List") were disqualified from running. The Democratic Generation Party responded that all necessary paperwork was submitted.

Haitham al-Hariry, a former MP from Alexandria who is a member of the Socialist Popular Alliance Party (SPAP), as well as SPAP member Mohamed Abdel Halim, were disqualified from running, in addition to members of the Al-Nour Party, after the National Elections Authority ruled that decrees by the Ministry of Defense exempting candidates were insufficient.

== Conduct ==
Hanan Sharshar, a member of the Homeland Defenders Party, spoke of being pressured to pay 25 million Egyptian pounds in order to be a candidate for the National Unified List for Egypt, which resulted in mass resignations in September.

Candidate Nashwa al-Deeb withdrew during the first phase, which was marked by low voter turnout. According to Wael el-Sayed, who worked on behalf of Nagwa Othman, a member of the Justice Party, campaign violations by the Nation's Future Party were the most noticeable, while a member of the Egyptian Social Democratic Party noted that it observed various electoral infractions.

Zawia3 noted persistent vote buying.

President Abdel Fattah el-Sisi issued an "unprecedented" statement in mid-November calling for annulments if the outcome of a particular election was unclear. On 18 November, Egypt annulled votes in 19 of the 70 constituencies following alleged "violations", including political ad violations and counting errors. The National Elections Authority re-ran elections locally in those 19 constituencies, beginning on 3 December. The repeated elections were spread out across seven governorates. Egyptians located abroad began voting for the annulled 19 constituencies on 24 December. The Higher Administrative Court ruled on 30 November that 29 additional districts during the first phase of the elections had to re-run their elections. The results at four polling stations were invalidated during the second phase.

== Results ==
Party	Seats		
Party	Appointed	Elected	Total
Nation's Future Party	4	227	231
Homeland Defenders Party	5	86	91
National Front Party	5	65	70
Republican People's Party	3	25	28
Egyptian Social Democratic Party	1	11	12
Egyptian Wafd Party	3	9	12
Justice Party	0	11	11
Reform and Development Party	2	9	11
Al-Nour Party	0	6	6
National Progressive Unionist Rally Party	0	5	5
Egyptian Congress Party	0	4	4
Egyptian Freedom Party	0	2	2
Eradet Geel Party	1	1	2
Consciousness Party	0	1	1
Conservative Party	0	1	1
Independents	4	105	109
Total	28	568	596
Source: Al Jazeera Arabic, Ahram Online

Results for the first phase of the election were released on 18 November. The sole list to compete won in all of the constituencies in which it ran, by winning more than five percent of the vote.

The National Elections Authority announced the results of the first round of the second phase in early December; the Nation's Future Party won 22 seats, the Homeland Defenders Party won six seats, the National Front won four seats, the Republican People's Party won two seats, the Justice Party and the Conservative Party each won a seat and four independents also won seats. Five opposition candidates (including the leader of the Justice Party and a member of the Al-Nour Party), won their second phase elections outright, while several (including a member of the New Wafd Party and a member of the Tagammu Party) advanced to run offs.

Runoff results for the second phase were expected be released on 25 December, though the annulments delayed their release until 10 January.

== Aftermath ==
Sisi appointed 28 members to the parliament, including Sameh Shoukry, on 11 January 2026.
