= Senate (Egypt) =

Upper house of the Parliament of Egypt

Egyptian Senate مجلس الشيوخ Magles El Shiyoukh

Type
- Type: Upper house

Leadership
- President of the Senate: Essam El-Din Farid since 18 October 2025

Structure
- Political groups: Government (Madbouly Cabinet) (269): NFP (118); HDP (72); National Front (45); RPP (14); Wafd (6); Congress (3); Freedom (2); ِAl-Nour (2); Eradet Geel (1); ِFEP (1); ِREP (1); ِSadat (1); ADNP (1); DGP (1); Wa'i (1); Opposition (20): ESDP (7); RDP (5); Justice (5); Tagammu (3); Independents (11)

Elections
- Last election: 4–5 and 27–28 August 2025
- Next election: 2030

Meeting place
- The Egyptian Senate Building - Cairo

The Senate is the upper house of Egypt's bicameral parliament, with the House of Representatives serving as the lower house. Together, the Senate and the House of Representatives have the legislative authority under the Article 101 in Chapter Five of the Egyptian Constitution.

Since 1866, over a period that represents the history of parliamentary life in modern Egypt, the country has witnessed seven parliamentary systems, each with different legislative and oversight powers, ultimately reflecting the history of the Egyptian people’s struggle and their pursuit of establishing a democratic and free society.

It succeeded the Shura Council after the passage of the 2019 Egyptian constitutional referendum, with the subsequent 2020 Egyptian Senate election marking its first election. The current president of the Senate is Essam El-Din Farid.

== History and background ==
The Shura Council (Egyptian Arabic: مجلس الشورى, pronounced [ˈmæɡles eʃˈʃuːɾˤɑ], "consultative council") was the upper house of the bicameral Parliament of Egypt. Its name roughly translated into English as "the Consultative Council". The council was abolished by the 2014 constitution.

The Shura Council was created in 1980 through a constitutional amendment. The council was composed of 264 members of which 176 members were directly elected and 88 were appointed by the President of the Republic for six-year terms. Membership was rotating, with one half of the council renewed every three years.

On 19 August 2008, a huge fire seriously damaged most of the 19th-century palace that houses the Shura Council in Cairo. At least 16 people were hurt in the fire, which destroyed the parliamentary archive room and several meeting chambers.

According to the Egyptian Channel 1, 99% of the documents were destroyed in the fire.

On 21 November 2009, President Mubarak inaugurated the new Shura Council Building, which was renovated by Al Mokaweloon Al Arab.

A legal challenge concerning the constitutionality of the Shura Council was to have been considered on 2 December 2012 by the Supreme Constitutional Court, but the court postponed the verdict in response to protests. Mohamed Morsi's constitutional declaration issued in November 2012 bars the Shura Council from being dissolved by the judiciary. The constitutional declaration issued by Morsi in December 2012 allowed the Shura Council to be dissolved by the judiciary. The Supreme Constitutional Court referred the lawsuit to the State Commissioners' Board, which is the advisory board of the Supreme Constitutional Court, on 15 January 2013. The board of commissioners will review the lawsuit on 10 February 2013; after lawyers give the required documents, the board will create a report on the constitutionality of the election law. The report was received 22 April 2013. The formation of the Shura Council was ruled unconstitutional on 2 June 2013. As of early July 2013, 30 members of the Shura Council have resigned. The Shura Council was dissolved on 5 July 2013.

The amendments that followed the 2019 Egyptian constitutional referendum made the parliament a bicameral body, with the Shura Council which was abolished in 2014 restored as the Senate, which would consist of 120 elected members and 60 appointed by the president. This was later increased to 300 members, with one third elected by district, one third by proportional vote, and one third appointed by the president, with a 5-year term of office.

== Members ==
The Senate comprised 300 members, two-thirds (200) of whom were elected by direct ballot (with 100 elected individually and 100 elected in a collective listing system), and the remaining third appointed by the President of the Republic. Women must make up no less than 10% of the Senate.

=== Term of membership and activities ===
The term membership of the Shura Council was six years. However, renewed election and appointment of 50% of the total number of members was required every three years, and re-election and re-appointment was possible for those members whose terms were expiring. The Constitution provided many guarantees to protect the council, including:

- The Council may not be dissolved except by a Presidential decree and only in case of necessity.
- Members of the Council have parliamentary immunity.

=== Candidates criteria ===
In accordance with the law, any candidate wishing to be elected to the Senate shall meet the following conditions:

- Hold the Egyptian nationality.
- Be not less than 35 years old upon election or nomination.
- Have completed military service or be exempted therefrom.

The Senate member is elected by the absolute majority of valid votes cast in the elections.

== Powers ==
Although the powers of the Shura Council were not as extensive or effective as the People's Assembly, its jurisdiction as provided by Articles (194) and (195) of the Constitutions of 1971 and 2012 covers the studying and proposing of what is deemed necessary to preserve the principles of the 23 July revolution and the 15 May 1971 Corrective Revolution. The Shura Council consulted on the following (Article 195):

The council must ratify:

- Constitutional amendment bills.
- All treaties or agreements affecting Egypt's territorial integrity or sovereignty.

In case of disagreements with the People's Assembly, a combined committee is formed composed of both chambers’ chairmen and seven members from each chamber. The proposed bill is reconsidered in both chambers. If either still disagrees, the issue is once again in a joint session of both chambers to reach a common statement.

The council is considered on a consultative capacity for:

- Drafts, and general plans for social and economic development.
- Bills referred to the council by the President of the Republic.
- All matters relating to the state's general policy or international issues referred to the Shura Council by the President of the Republic.

In this case, the council submitted its decision to the president and the People's Assembly.

== Parliamentary elections ==
There are currently many recognized political parties covering a broad political spectrum. However, the formation of political parties based on religion is prohibited by the Constitution. Opposition and political pressure groups are active in Egypt and make their views public, and they are represented at various levels in the political system.

The November 2000 parliamentary elections are generally regarded to have been more transparent and better executed than past elections. This is due to the new law put into force establishing universal judicial monitoring of polling stations. On the other hand, opposition parties continue to lodge credible complaints about electoral manipulation by the government. There are significant restrictions on the political process and freedom of expression for non-governmental organizations, including professional syndicates and organizations promoting respect for human rights.

== See also ==
- Shura
- List of speakers of the Shura Council
