= 1980 Egyptian constitutional referendum =

- 22 May 1980
- Outcome: Shura Council created

Results
| Choice | Votes | % |
|---|---|---|
| Yes | 10,339,055 | 98.96% |
| No | 108,657 | 1.04% |
| Valid votes | 10,447,712 | 99.81% |
| Invalid or blank votes | 19,730 | 0.19% |
| Total votes | 10,467,442 | 100.00% |
| Registered voters/turnout | | 86.95% |

A constitutional referendum was held in Egypt on 22 May 1980. The amendments would create the Shura Council, an upper house for the country's Parliament, and were approved by 99% of voters.

== Results ==
| Choice | Votes | % |
|---|---|---|
| For | 10,339,055 | 98.96 |
| Against | 108,657 | 1.04 |
| Total | 10,447,712 | 100.00 |
| Valid votes | 10,447,712 | 99.81 |
| Invalid/blank votes | 19,730 | 0.19 |
| Total votes | 10,467,442 | 100.00 |
| Registered voters/turnout | 12,038,462 | 86.95 |
Source: Direct Democracy
