= 2020 Egyptian Senate election =

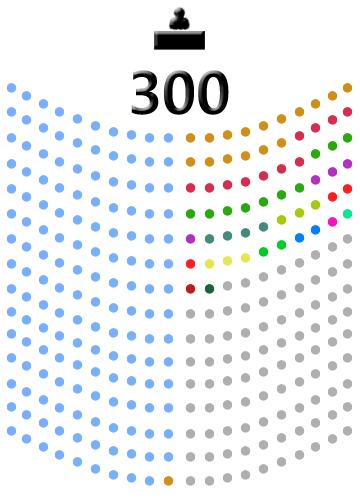
Political groups Nation's Future Party: 149 seats Republican People’s Party: 17 seats Homeland Defenders Party: 11 seats New Wafd: 10 seats Tagammu' Party: 5 seats Modern Egypt Party: 4 seats Reform and Development Party: 3 seats Egyptian Social Democratic Party: 3 seats Congress Party: 3 seats National Movement Party: 2 seats EL Nour Party: 2 seats Eradet Geel Party: 1 seat Egyptian Freedom Party: 1 seat El Sadat Democratic Party: 1 seat Justice Party: 1 seat Independents: 88 seats Based on *Archived here

Senate elections were held in Egypt on 11 and 12 August 2020, with the diaspora voting on 9 and 10 August. Run-offs took place on 8–9 September (6-7 for the diaspora), and their results were announced on 16 September.

== Background ==
Shura Council elections were scheduled to take place in Egypt at most a year after the new House of Representatives was seated, according to Article 230 of the Egyptian Constitution of 2012. The election did not take place because the Shura Council was abolished in the 2014 constitution. However, in 2019, after the 2019 Egyptian constitutional referendum, further amendments made the parliament a bicameral body, with the Shura Council restored as the Senate.

Incumbent President Abdel Fattah el-Sisi and parties supporting him have been labeled as running an authoritarian regime by international media outlets.

Egyptian businessmen who were involved in discussions for the final composition for the National Unified List for Egypt included Mohamed M. Abou El Enein, Gamal al-Garhi, Ahmed al-Sweidi, Ahmed Abu Hashima and Hisham Talaat Moustafa. It was decided that Abou El Enein and al-Sweidi would take on more public roles, while Moustafa's role was minimized because of his involvement in the murder of Suzanne Tamim.

== Dates ==
Overseas voting for run-off rounds was completed on 7 September. In-country voting began on 9 September for 14 governorates, specifically, "Giza, Qalyubia, Port Said, Ismailia, Menofia, Kafr El Sheikh, Damietta, Beni Suef, Assiut, Sohag, Qena, Luxor, Aswan and Matrouh".

== Electoral system ==
Originally upon its re-establishment, the body was to consist of at least 120 elected members and 60 appointed by the president. The House later fixed the numbers at 300 senators, with one third appointed by the president, one third directly elected in 27 single member constituencies coterminous with the governorates under a two-round system, and the last third directly elected as well, under a closed party list system in four multi-member constituencies with a five percent threshold.

The distribution of seats by province is as follows:

Governorate	Area (km^{2})	Population (July 2014)	SMC seats	List seats	List constituency	Total seats
Dakahliya	3,471	5,818,363	6	6	Cairo and the South and Central Delta	12
Gharbia	1,942	4,648,408	5	5	Cairo and the South and Central Delta	10
Monufia	1,532	3,849,850	4	4	Cairo and the South and Central Delta	8
Kafr el-Sheikh	3,437	3,093,754	3	3	Cairo and the South and Central Delta	6
Qalyubia	1,001	4,989,302	6	6	Cairo and the South and Central Delta	12
Cairo	1,983	9,102,232	11	10	Cairo and the South and Central Delta	21
Beni Suef	1,322	2,771,138	3	3	Northern, Central, and Southern Upper Egypt	6
Giza	85,153	7,397,577	8	8	Northern, Central, and Southern Upper Egypt	16
Minya	32,279	5,004,421	5	5	Northern, Central, and Southern Upper Egypt	10
Faiyum	1,827	3,072,181	3	3	Northern, Central, and Southern Upper Egypt	6
Asyut	25,926	4,123,441	4	4	Northern, Central, and Southern Upper Egypt	8
New Valley	376,505	219,615	1	1	Northern, Central, and Southern Upper Egypt	2
Sohag	1,547	4,469,151	5	5	Northern, Central, and Southern Upper Egypt	10
Qena	1,851	2,959,175	3	3	Northern, Central, and Southern Upper Egypt	6
Aswan	679	1,394,687	1	2	Northern, Central, and Southern Upper Egypt	3
Red Sea	203,685	337,051	1	1	Northern, Central, and Southern Upper Egypt	2
Alexandria	2,679	4,716,078	7	7	Western Delta	14
Beheira	10,130	5,647,233	7	7	Western Delta	14
Matrouh	212,112	427,573	1	1	Western Delta	2
Ismailia	1,442	1,146,033	2	1	Eastern Delta	3
Luxor	55	1,119,222	1	2	Eastern Delta	3
Port Said	72	653,770	1	1	Eastern Delta	2
South Sinai	33,140	164,574	1	1	Eastern Delta	2
Damietta	589	1,300,815	2	2	Eastern Delta	4
Suez	17,840	607,775	1	1	Eastern Delta	2
Sharqia	4,180	6,327,562	7	7	Eastern Delta	14
North Sinai	27,574	421,984	1	1	Eastern Delta	2
Total	1,002,450	85,782,965	100	100		200

== Conduct ==
The pro-government Nation's Future Party was accused of buying votes in several constituencies. The government was also accused of only implementing safety precautions due to the COVID-19 pandemic in areas that witnessed a large media presence. The National Council for Human Rights was also prevented from visiting several polling stations by the police, and some polling stations were said to have had insufficient ambulances and wheelchairs for people with disabilities and the elderly.

== Results ==
Results National Unified List: 194 seats Independents: 6 seats Nominated senators : 100 seats

=== First round ===
Turnout in the first round was 14.23%, amid opposition boycotts, general voter apathy, confusion over the role the Senate would have, and the COVID-19 pandemic, with around 7.57 million valid votes cast, in addition to roughly 1.38 million invalid votes cast, despite over 62 million voters having been registered to participate. A total of 74 of the 100 constituency seats were won in the first round, while 26 will hold run-off elections in September between the top two candidates in the constituencies. Out of the 74 determined constituency seats in the first round, 68 went to the Nation's Future Party, which has extremely close connections to members in the government of President Abdel Fattah el-Sisi. The Republican People's Party, another pro-government party, won five seats, and one seat went to an independent candidate. In terms of the 100 seats allocated from closed lists, the only closed list submitted was led by the Nation's Future Party (which holds 59 of the 100 spots in the list), although it included six members of two parties from an opposition coalition that opposed the constitutional changes that re-introduced an upper chamber of the legislature. (Note: The full list consists of the Nation's Future Party, New Wafd Party, Egyptian Social Democratic Party, Republican People's Party, Modern Egypt Party, National Progressive Unionist Party, Congress Party, Reform and Development Party, Egyptian Patriotic Movement, Homeland Defenders Party, and Freedom Party.) According to Reuters, as the list received more than 5% of votes across the country (the threshold needed for lists), and was the only one submitted, the National Elections Authority declared that it had won [all 100 list seats] by acclamation.

=== Second round ===
Turnout in the second round was estimated to be even lower than the first, with 2,884,757 voters participating out of a registered 28,217,880, for a turnout of approximately 10.22%. A total of 2,451,704 votes (84.09%) were valid. The National Electoral Authority appeared to contradict prior seat count reports from the first round for the Nation's Future Party according to one source, saying they had earned 50 seats rather than 59. The Nation's Future Party won 20 constituency seats in the second round, with five seats going to independent candidates and one to the Republican People's Party.

== Aftermath ==
El-Sisi appointed 53 members to the senate in October 2020. They included Sameh Ashour, the former head of the Lawyers Syndicate, Bahaa El-Din Abu Shoka, the head of the New Wafd Party, and others.

== Boycott ==
Several parties announced that they would boycott the elections, including the Constitution Party, Dignity Party, the Socialist Popular Alliance Party, and the Bread and Freedom Party, in addition to public figures such as Hamdeen Sabahi, George Ishaq, Abdelgelil Mostafa (the General Coordinator of the National Association for Change) and Mustapha Kamel Al Sayyid (professor of political science and director of the Center for the Study of Developing Countries at Cairo University).
