= Human Rights Committee (Egypt) =

Egyptian House of Representatives committee

The Human Rights Committee is one of the permanent committees of the Egyptian House of Representatives.

== Chairs ==
Portrait	Chairman	Took office	Left office	Party	Ref.
Mortada Mansour	Mortada Mansour (born 1941)	January 2016	?	?	
Mohamed Anwar Esmat Sadat	Mohamed Anwar Esmat Sadat (born 1955)	April 2016	2007	Reform & Development	
Alaa Abed	Alaa Abed	October 2016		Free Egyptians	
Tarek Radwan	Tarek Radwan	October 2022		Nation's Future	
