= List of speakers of the Senate (Egypt) =

The President of the Senate is the presiding officer of that body. From the creation of the Shura Council in 1980 until its abolition in 2014, and was replaced in 2020 by the Senate as the upper house of the Parliament of Egypt.

== List ==
| Name | Portrait | Took office | Left office | Political party |
Shoura Council
| 1 | Dr. Mohamed Subhi Abdel Hakim | 1 November 1980 | 10 November 1986 | National Democratic Party |
| 2 | Dr. Ali Lutfi Mahmud | 11 November 1986 | 22 April 1989 | National Democratic Party |
Vacant (22 April 1989–24 June 1989)
| 3 | Dr. Mustafa Kamal Helmi | 24 June 1989 | 23 June 2004 | National Democratic Party |
| 4 | Mohamed Safwat El Sherif | 23 June 2004 | 13 February 2011 (deposed) | National Democratic Party |
Vacant (13 February 2011–28 February 2012)
| 5 | Ahmed Fahmy | 28 February 2012 | 3 July 2013 (deposed) | Freedom and Justice Party |
Vacant (3 July 2013–18 January 2014)
Post abolished (18 January 2014)
Senate
| 6 | Abdel-Wahab Abdel-Razeq | 18 October 2020 | 18 October 2025 | Nation's Future Party |
| 7 | Essam El-Din Farid | 18 October 2025 | present | Nation's Future Party |

== Sources ==
- Official website of the Shura Council
