= 2020 Egyptian parliamentary election =

- 21 October–8 November 2020 (first round); 21 November–8 December 2020 (second round)
- 568 of the 596 seats in the House of Representatives; 298 seats needed for a majority
Party	Leader	Seats	+/–
Nation's Future	Ashraf Rashad	317	+264
Republican People's	Hazem Omar	49	+36
New Wafd	Bahaa El-Din Abu Shoka	25	−11
Homeland Defenders	Galal Haridy	23	+5
Modern Egypt Party	Nabil Dibis	13	+9
Reform & Development	Mohamed Anwar Sadat	9	+6
Congress	Omar El-Mokhtar Semeida	8	−4
Freedom	Mamdouh Hassan	7	+7
Social Democratic	Farid Zahran	7	+3
Al-Nour	Yunis Makhyun	7	+7
Tagammu	Sayed Abdel Aal	6	+4
Justice		2	+2
Eradet Geel		2	+2
Independents	–	117	−208
This lists parties that won seats. See the complete results below.
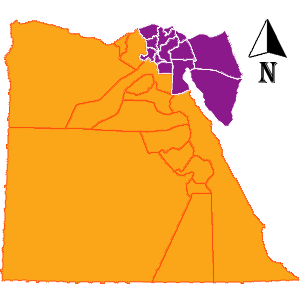
Map of governorates by electoral phase
Prime Minister before	Prime Minister after
Mostafa Madbouly; Independent	Mostafa Madbouly; Independent

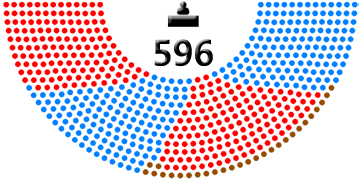
A chart showing the number of elected and appointed MPs seats in the Egyptian Parliament, 2020 Parliament members elected by individual system in the first phase: 142 Members of Parliament elected by list in the first phase: 142 Parliament members elected by the individual system of the second phase: 142 Members of Parliament elected by list in the second phase: 142 Members of Parliament appointed by the President of Egypt: 28

Parliamentary elections were held in Egypt on 24–25 October and 7–8 November 2020 to elect 568 members of the House of Representatives. The election resulted in a landslide victory for the Nation's Future Party, which secured 316 of the 596 seats, increasing its representation from the previous parliament.

== Date ==
The elections were initially expected to be held in April or May 2020. President Abdel Fattah el-Sisi ordered parliament to freeze its activities on 1 October 2019

Date	Phase	Eligible voters
21–23 October	Round 1 of the first phase for citizens abroad	Alexandria, Giza, Beheira, Matruh, Faiyum, Beni Suef, Minya, Asyut, New Valley, Sohag, Qena, Luxor, Aswan and Red Sea citizens who reside abroad
24–25 October	Round 1 of the first phase for citizens in Egypt	Alexandria, Giza, Beheira, Matruh, Faiyum, Beni Suef, Minya, Asyut, New Valley, Sohag, Qena, Luxor, Aswan and Red Sea citizens
4–6 November	Round 1 of the second phase for citizens abroad	Cairo, Qalyubia, Dakahlia, Monufia, Sharqia, Gharbiya, Kafr El Sheikh, Damietta, Port Said, Ismailia, Suez, North Sinai and South Sinai citizens who reside abroad
7–8 November	Round 1 of the second phase for citizens in Egypt	Cairo, Qalyubia, Dakahlia, Monufia, Sharqia, Gharbiya, Kafr El Sheikh, Damietta, Port Said, Ismailia, Suez, North Sinai and South Sinai citizens
21–23 November	Round 2 of the first phase for citizens abroad	Alexandria, Giza, Beheira, Matruh, Faiyum, Beni Suef, Minya, Asyut, New Valley, Sohag, Qena, Luxor, Aswan and Red Sea citizens who reside abroad
23–24 November	Round 2 of the first phase for citizens in Egypt	Alexandria, Giza, Beheira, Matruh, Faiyum, Beni Suef, Minya, Asyut, New Valley, Sohag, Qena, Luxor, Aswan and Red Sea citizens
4–6 December	Round 2 of the second phase for citizens abroad	Cairo, Qalyubia, Dakahlia, Monufia, Sharqia, Gharbiya, Kafr El Sheikh, Damietta, Port Said, Ismailia, Suez, North Sinai and South Sinai citizens who reside abroad
7–8 December	Round 2 of the second phase for citizens in Egypt	Cairo, Qalyubia, Dakahlia, Monufia, Sharqia, Gharbiya, Kafr El Sheikh, Damietta, Port Said, Ismailia, Suez, North Sinai and South Sinai citizens

The final results will be announced by the National Elections Authority on 14 December 2020.

== Electoral system ==
A total of 568 seats will be elected in a form of parallel voting; 284 of them will be elected using a two-round system in 142 constituencies and the other 284 will be elected using party lists in four constituencies.

=== PR constituencies ===
#	Constituency name	No. of seats	Governorates	Election date
1	Cairo, Central and Southern Delta	100	Cairo, Qalyubia, Dakahlia, Monufia, Gharbiya, Kafr El Sheikh	7–8 November
2	Northern, Central and Southern Upper Egypt	100	Giza, Faiyum, Beni Suef, Minya, Asyut, New Valley, Sohag, Qena, Luxor, Aswan, Red Sea	24–25 October
3	Western Delta	42	Alexandria, Beheira, Matruh	24–25 October
4	Eastern Delta	42	Sharqia, Damietta, Port Said, Ismailia, Suez, North Sinai, South Sinai	7–8 November

=== TR constituencies ===
#	Name	No. of constituencies	No. of TR seats	PR constituency	Election date
1	Cairo	19	31	Cairo, Central and Southern Delta	7–8 November
2	Giza	12	25	Northern, Central and Southern Upper Egypt	24–25 October
3	Dakahlia	10	21	Cairo, Central and Southern Delta	7–8 November
4	Sharqia	8	21	Eastern Delta	7–8 November
5	Beheira	9	18	Western Delta	24–25 October
6	Alexandria	6	16	Western Delta	24–25 October
7	Qalyubia	6	16	Cairo, Central and Southern Delta	7–8 November
8	Minya	6	16	Northern, Central and Southern Upper Egypt	24–25 October
9	Sohag	8	14	Northern, Central and Southern Upper Egypt	24–25 October
10	Gharbia	7	14	Cairo, Central and Southern Delta	7–8 November
11	Asyut	4	12	Northern, Central and Southern Upper Egypt	24–25 October
12	Monufia	6	11	Cairo, Central and Southern Delta	7–8 November
13	Kafr El Sheikh	4	10	Cairo, Central and Southern Delta	7–8 November
14	Faiyum	4	10	Northern, Central and Southern Upper Egypt	24–25 October
15	Qena	4	9	Northern, Central and Southern Upper Egypt	24–25 October
16	Beni Suef	4	8	Northern, Central and Southern Upper Egypt	24–25 October
17	Aswan	4	5	Northern, Central and Southern Upper Egypt	24–25 October
18	Ismailia	3	5	Eastern Delta	7–8 November
19	Damietta	2	4	Eastern Delta	7–8 November
20	Luxor	3	3	Northern, Central and Southern Upper Egypt	24–25 October
21	Red Sea	3	3	Northern, Central and Southern Upper Egypt	24–25 October
22	New Valley	2	2	Northern, Central and Southern Upper Egypt	24–25 October
23	Matruh	2	2	Western Delta	24–25 October
24	Port Said	2	2	Eastern Delta	7–8 November
25	North Sinai	2	2	Eastern Delta	7–8 November
26	South Sinai	2	2	Eastern Delta	7–8 November
27	Suez	2	2	Eastern Delta	7–8 November
	Total	143	284		

== Parties ==
Sisi placed the National Security Agency (NSA) in charge of creating lists of candidates, as the General Intelligence Directorate (GID) had not satisfactorily selected candidates in the 2015 Egyptian parliamentary election. The For the Love of Egypt list, which ran in 2015, was closely associated with the GID.

One alliance that will contest the election, called the National Unified Coalition, includes the Nation's Future Party, New Wafd Party, the Homeland Defenders Party, Modern Egypt Party, the Egyptian Social Democratic Party, the Republican People's Party, the Reform and Development Party, Tagammu Party, the Will of a Generation Party, the Egyptian Freedom Party, the Justice Party, and the Congress Party. Various parties on the list were "dissatisfied" with the amount of seats that were allocated; numerous members resigned from the Republican People's Party. There was dissension in the Wafd Party over whether the party should run as part of the list, with party head Bahaa El-Din Abu Shoka maintaining that the party would participate in the National List, which the party's supreme committee voted against. The Nation’s Future Party also witnessed turmoil and faced various resignations, including MP Mohamed Aboul Enein, who announced he would run as an independent.

Other lists include the Call of Egypt and the Sons of Egypt.

The Conservative Party stated that it would run an electoral list known as “the Choice”, which included the Union Party, headed by Hossam Badrawi, the Arab Democratic Nasserist Party, the Revolutionary Guards Party, and the Independent’s Coalition headed by Hisham Anani.

The Patriotic Current, which was announced in September by former governor of Alexandria, Tarek al-Mahdi, expected to take part in the election "with 25 parties", though the alliance was excluded from the election.

Many different figures, including former MP Zyad Elelaimy, Hisham Fouad, Omar El-Shenety and Hossam Moanis, were arrested on 25 June 2019 on charges of "bringing down the state"; however, the people involved were part of an alliance called the Coalition of Hope that was considering contesting the parliamentary election. Other organizations involved in the alliance included the Civil Democratic Movement. One source indicated that the reason for the arrests was the unwillingness of the alliance to cooperate with the NSA. They were subsequently convicted in 2021 and given prison sentences. Elelaimy was released after serving three and a half years.

== Results ==
Party	Votes	%	Seats
Nation's Future Party			317
Republican People's Party			49
New Wafd Party			25
Homeland Defenders Party			23
Modern Egypt Party			13
Reform and Development Party			9
Egyptian Congress Party			8
Al-Nour Party			7
Egyptian Freedom Party			7
Egyptian Social Democratic Party			7
National Progressive Unionist Rally Party			6
Justice Party			2
Will of a Generation Party			2
Independents			117
TBD			4
Total			596
Total votes	18,358,895	–	
Registered voters/turnout	63,157,351	29.07	
Source: IPU Parline
