= History of modern Egypt =

According to most scholars the history of modern Egypt dates from the start of the rule of Muhammad Ali in 1805 and his launching of Egypt's modernization project that involved building a new army and suggesting a new map for the country, though the definition of Egypt's modern history has varied in accordance with different definitions of modernity. Some scholars date it as far back as 1516 with the Ottomans' defeat of the Mamluk Sultanate in 1516–17.

Muhammad Ali's dynasty made Egypt practically independent from Ottoman rule, following his military campaigns against the Empire and his ability to enlist large-scale armies, allowing him to extend Egypt's control over parts of North Africa and the Middle East. In 1882, the Khedivate of Egypt became part of the British sphere of influence in the region, a situation that conflicted with its position as an autonomous vassal state of the Ottoman Empire. The country became a British protectorate in 1915 and achieved full independence in 1922, becoming a kingdom under the rule of Muhammad Ali's dynasty, which lasted until 1952.

Gamal Abdel Nasser ended monarchical rule and established a republic in Egypt, known as the Republic of Egypt, following the 1952 Egyptian revolution. Egypt was ruled autocratically by four presidents over the following six decades: by Mohamed Naguib from 1953 to 1954, Nasser from 1954 until his death in 1970, by Anwar Sadat from 1971 until his assassination in 1981, and by Hosni Mubarak from 1981 until his resignation in the face of the 2011 Egyptian revolution.

In 2012, after more than a year under the interim government of the Supreme Council of the Armed Forces, with Field Marshal Tantawi as its chairman, elections were held and the Islamist Mohamed Morsi became the first democratically elected head of state in the entire history of Egypt. In 2013, after millions of Egyptians in huge rallies and demonstrations demanding Morsi's resignation, the army announced the ousting of Morsi and preparations for a new election. Resulting in the election of Abdel Fattah El-Sisi

== British administration ==
In 1882 opposition to European control led to growing tension amongst notable Egyptians, the most dangerous opposition coming from the army. A large military demonstration in September 1881 forced the Khedive Tewfiq to dismiss his prime minister. In April 1882, France and the United Kingdom sent warships to Alexandria to bolster the Khedive amidst a turbulent climate, spreading fear of invasion throughout the country.

Tawfiq moved to Alexandria for fear of his own safety as army officers led by Ahmed Urabi began to take control of the government. By June Egypt was in the hands of nationalists opposed to European domination of the country. The naval bombardment of Alexandria by the Royal Navy had little effect on the opposition which led to the landing of a British expeditionary force at both ends of the Suez Canal in August 1882.

The British succeeded in defeating the Egyptian Army at Tel El Kebir in September and took control of the country putting Tawfiq back in control. The purpose of the invasion had been to restore political stability to Egypt under a government of the Khedive and international controls which were in place to streamline Egyptian financing since 1876. It is unlikely that the British expected a long-term occupation from the outset. However, Lord Cromer, Britain's Chief Representative in Egypt at the time, viewed Egypt's financial reforms as part of a long-term objective. Cromer took the view that political stability needed financial stability, and embarked on a programme of long-term investment in Egypt's productive resources, above all in the cotton economy, the mainstay of the country's export earnings.

In 1906 the Denshawai incident provoked a questioning of British rule in Egypt. British administration ended nominally with the establishment of a protectorate and the installation of sultan Hussein Kamel in 1914, but a British military presence in Egypt lasted until June 1956.

== Sultanate of Egypt ==
In 1914 as a result of the declaration of war with the Ottoman Empire, of which Egypt was nominally a part, Britain declared a Protectorate over Egypt and deposed the anti-British Khedive, Abbas Hilmi II, replacing him with his uncle Husayn Kamel, who was made Sultan of Egypt by the British. Egypt subsequently declared its independence from the Ottoman Empire.

A group known as the Wafd Delegation attended the Paris Peace Conference of 1919 to demand Egypt's independence. Included in the group was political leader, Saad Zaghlul, who would later become prime minister. When the group was arrested and deported to the island of Malta, a huge uprising occurred in Egypt.

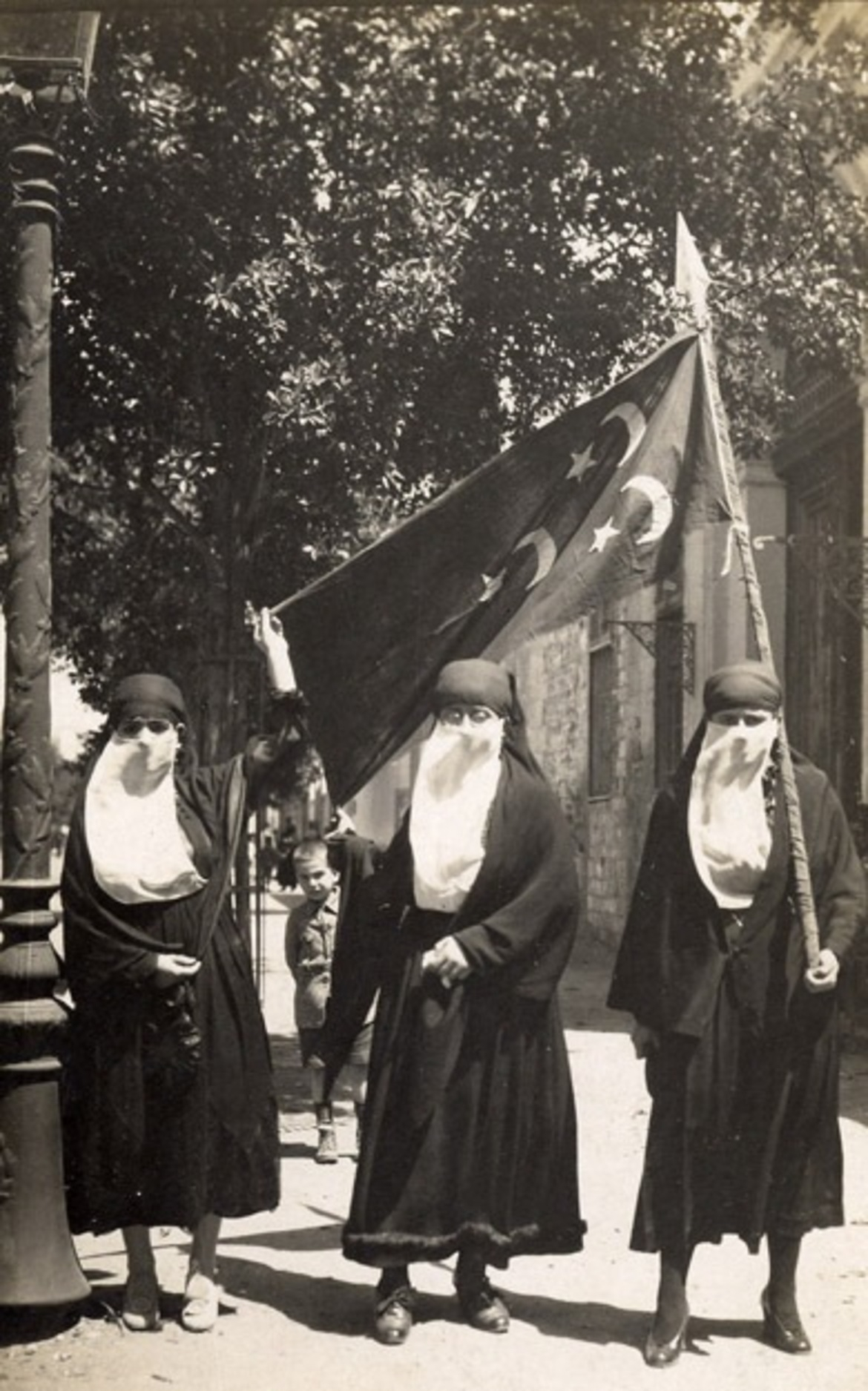
Female nationalists demonstrating in Cairo, 1919.

From March to April 1919, there were mass demonstrations that became uprisings. This is known in Egypt as the 1919 Revolution. Almost daily demonstrations and unrest continued throughout Egypt for the remainder of the Spring. To the surprise of the British authorities, Egyptian women also demonstrated, led by Huda Sha‘rawi (1879–1947), who would become the leading feminist voice in Egypt in the first half of the twentieth century. The first women's demonstration was held on Sunday, 16 March 1919, and was followed by yet another one on Thursday, 20 March 1919. Egyptian women would continue to play an important and increasingly public nationalist role throughout the spring and summer of 1919 and beyond.

Initially, the British authorities deployed the police force in Cairo in response to the demonstrations, though control was soon handed over to Egyptian Expeditionary Force (EEF) troops under the command of Major-General H. D. Watson. By the summer of 1919, the disturbances had largely been suppressed; more than 800 Egyptians had been killed, as well as 31 European civilians and 29 British soldiers. In November 1919, the Milner Commission was sent to Egypt by the British to attempt to resolve the situation. In 1920, Lord Milner submitted his report to Lord Curzon, the British Foreign Secretary, recommending that the protectorate should be replaced by a treaty of alliance. As a result, Curzon agreed to receive an Egyptian mission headed by Zaghlul and Adli Pasha to discuss the proposals. The mission arrived in London in June 1920 and the agreement was concluded in August 1920.

In February 1921, the British Parliament approved the agreement and Egypt was asked to send another mission to London with full powers to conclude a definitive treaty. Adli Pasha led this mission, which arrived in June 1921. However, the Dominion delegates at the 1921 Imperial Conference had stressed the importance of maintaining control over the Suez Canal Zone and Curzon could not persuade his Cabinet colleagues to agree to any terms that Adli Pasha was prepared to accept. The mission returned to Egypt in disgust.

== Kingdom of Egypt ==
In December 1921, the British authorities in Cairo imposed martial law and once again deported Zaghlul. Demonstrations again led to violence. In deference to the growing nationalism and at the suggestion of the High Commissioner, Lord Allenby, the UK unilaterally declared Egyptian independence on 28 February 1922. Sultan Fuad I was subsequently proclaimed King of Egypt.

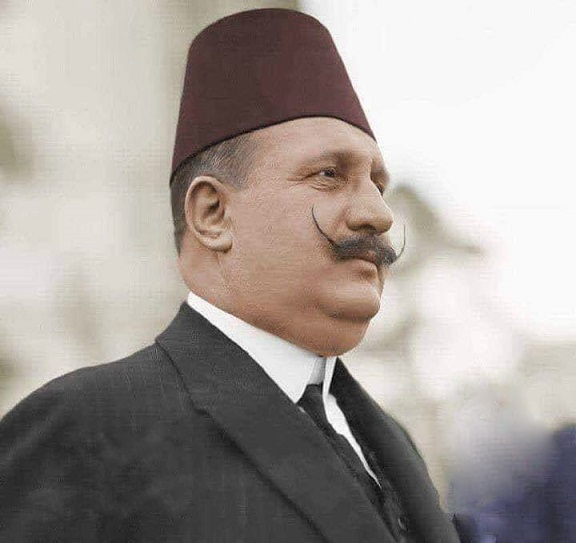
Fouad I

Britain, however, continued to retain a strong influence in the newborn Kingdom of Egypt. British guided the king and retained control of the Canal Zone, Sudan and Egypt's external and military affairs. King Fuad died in 1936 and King Farouk inherited the throne at the age of sixteen. Alarmed by the Second Italo-Abyssinian War when Italy invaded Ethiopia, he signed the Anglo-Egyptian treaty, requiring Britain to withdraw all troops from Egypt by 1949, except at the Suez Canal.

During World War II, British troops used Egypt as its primary base for all Allied operations throughout the region. British troops were withdrawn to the Suez Canal area in 1947, but nationalist, anti-British feelings continued to grow after the war.

== Republic of Egypt ==
=== Coup of 1952 ===
On 22–26 July 1952, a group of disaffected army officers (the "free officers") led by Muhammad Naguib and Gamal Abdel Nasser overthrew King Farouk, whom the military blamed for Egypt's poor performance in the 1948 war with Israel. Popular expectations for immediate reforms led to the workers' riots in Kafr Dawar on 12 August 1952, which resulted in two death sentences. Following a brief experiment with civilian rule, the Free Officers abrogated the 1953 constitution and declared Egypt a republic on 18 June 1953.

=== Nasser's rule ===
==== Emergence of Arab socialism ====
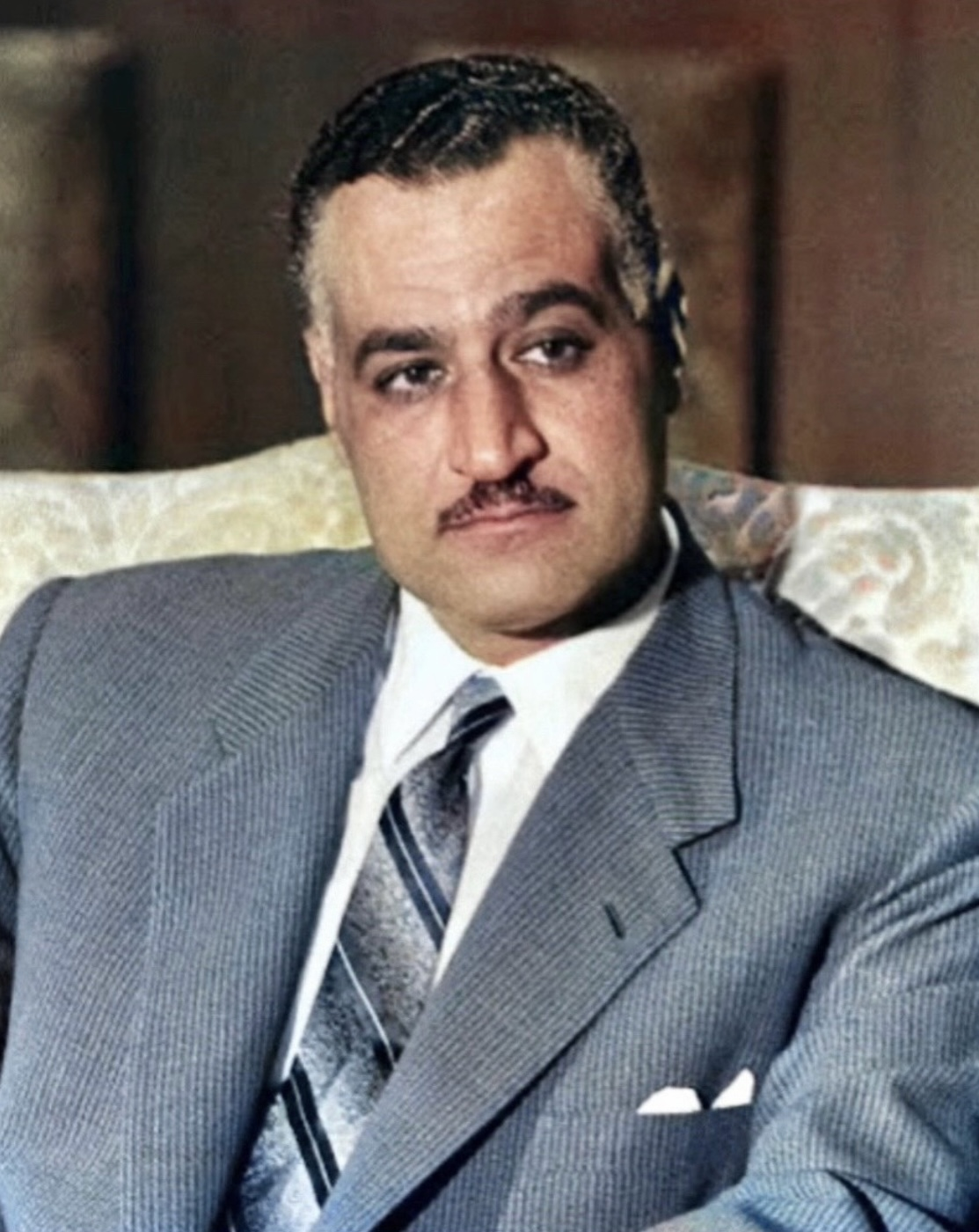
Gamal Abdel Nasser

Nasser evolved into a charismatic leader, not only of Egypt but of the Arab world, promoting and implementing "Arab socialism."

When the United States held up military sales in reaction to Egyptian neutrality regarding the Soviet Union, Nasser concluded an arms deal with Czechoslovakia in September 1955.

When the US and the World Bank withdrew their offer to help finance the Aswan High Dam in mid-1956, Nasser nationalized the privately owned Suez Canal Company. The crisis that followed, exacerbated by growing tensions with Israel over guerrilla attacks from Gaza and Israeli reprisals, support for the FLN's war of liberation against the French in Algeria and against Britain's presence in the Arab world, resulted in the invasion of Egypt in October by France, Britain, and Israel. This was also known as the Suez War. According to the historian Abd aI-Azim Ramadan, Nasser's decision to nationalize the Suez Canal was his alone, made without political or military consultation. The events leading up to the nationalization of the Suez Canal Company, as other events during Nasser's rule, showed Nasser's inclination to solitary decision making. He considers Nasser to be far from a rational, responsible leader.

==== United Arab Republic ====
In 1958 Egypt joined with the Republic of Syria and annexed the Gaza Strip, ruled by the All-Palestine Government, to form a state called the United Arab Republic. It existed until Syria's secession in 1961, although Egypt continued to be known as the UAR until 1971.

Nasser helped establish with India and Yugoslavia the Non-Aligned Movement of developing countries in September 1961, and continued to be a leading force in the movement until his death.

==== Regional intervention ====
Nasser had looked to a regime change in Yemen since 1957 and finally put his desires into practice in January 1962 by giving the Free Yemen Movement office space, financial support, and radio air time. Anthony Nutting's biography of Gamal Abdel-Nasser identifies several factors that led the Egyptian President to send expeditionary forces to Yemen. These included the unraveling of the union with Syria in 1961, which dissolved his United Arab Republic (UAR), damaging his prestige. A quick decisive victory in Yemen could help him recover leadership of the Arab world. Nasser also had his reputation as an anti-colonial force, setting his sights on ridding South Yemen, and its strategic port city of Aden, of British forces.

Nasser ruled as an autocrat but remained extremely popular within Egypt and throughout the Arab world. His willingness to stand up to the Western powers and to Israel won him support throughout the region. However, Nasser's independent foreign policy led to Israel launching the Six-Day War in 1967. This conflict saw the Egyptian, Syrian and Jordanian armed forces routed by the Israelis.

Israel afterward occupied the Sinai Peninsula and the Gaza Strip from Egypt, Golan Heights from Syria, and West Bank from Jordan. This defeat was a severe blow to Nasser's prestige both at home and abroad. Following the defeat, Nasser made a dramatic offer to resign, which was only retracted in the face of mass demonstrations urging him to stay. The last three years of his control over Egypt were far more subdued.

=== Sadat era ===
Sadat era refers to the presidency of Muhammad Anwar al-Sadat, the eleven-year period of Egyptian history spanning from the death of president Gamal Abdel Nasser in 1970, through Sadat's assassination by fundamentalist army officers on 6 October 1981. Sadat's presidency saw many changes in Egypt's direction, reversing some of the economic and political principles of Nasserism by breaking with Soviet Union to make Egypt an ally of the United States, initiated the peace process with Israel, re-instituting the multi-party system and abandoning socialism by launching the Infitah economic policy.

==== Under Soviet influence ====
After Nasser's death, another of the original revolutionary "free officers," Vice President Anwar el-Sadat, was elected President of Egypt. Nasser's supporters in government settled on Sadat as a transitional figure that (they believed) could be manipulated easily. However, Sadat had a long term in office and many changes in mind for Egypt and by some astute political moves was able to institute a "corrective revolution", (announced on 15 May 1971) which purged the government, political and security establishments of the most ardent Nasserists. Sadat encouraged the emergence of an Islamist movement which had been suppressed by Nasser. Believing Islamists to be socially conservative he gave them "considerable cultural and ideological autonomy" in exchange for political support.

Following the disastrous Six-Day War of 1967, Egypt waged a War of Attrition in the Suez Canal zone. In 1971, three years into this war, Sadat endorsed in a letter the peace proposals of UN negotiator Gunnar Jarring, which seemed to lead to a full peace with Israel on the basis of Israel's withdrawal to its pre-war borders. This peace initiative failed as neither Israel nor the United States of America accepted the terms as discussed then. To provide Israel with more incentive to negotiate with Egypt and return the Sinai to it, and also because the Soviets had refused Sadat's requests for more military support, Sadat expelled the Soviet military advisers from Egypt and proceeded to bolster his army for a renewed confrontation with Israel.

In the months before the 1973 war Sadat engaged in a diplomatic offensive and by the fall of 1973 had support for a war of more than a hundred states, including most of the countries of the Arab League, Non-Aligned Movement, and Organization of African Unity. Syria agreed to join Egypt in attacking Israel.

In October 1973, Egypt's armed forces achieved initial successes in the Crossing and advanced 15 km, reaching the depth of the range of safe coverage of its own air force. After Syrian forces were being repulsed, the Syrian government urged Sadat to move his forces deeper into Sinai. Without air cover, the Egyptian army suffered huge losses. In spite of huge losses they kept advancing, creating the chance to open a gap between army forces. That gap was exploited by a tank division led by Ariel Sharon, and he and his tanks managed to penetrate, reaching Suez City. In the meantime, the United States initiated a strategic airlift to provide replacement weapons and supplies to Israel and appropriate $2.2 billion in emergency aid. OPEC oil ministers, led by Saudi Arabia retaliated with an oil embargo against the US. A UN resolution supported by the United States and the Soviet Union called for an end to hostilities and for peace talks to begin. On 4 March 1974 Israel withdrew the last of its troops from the west side of the Suez Canal and 12 days later Arab oil ministers announced the end of the embargo against the United States. For Sadat and many Egyptians the war was much more a victory than a draw, as the military objective of capturing a foothold of the Sinai was achieved.

==== Under Western influence ====
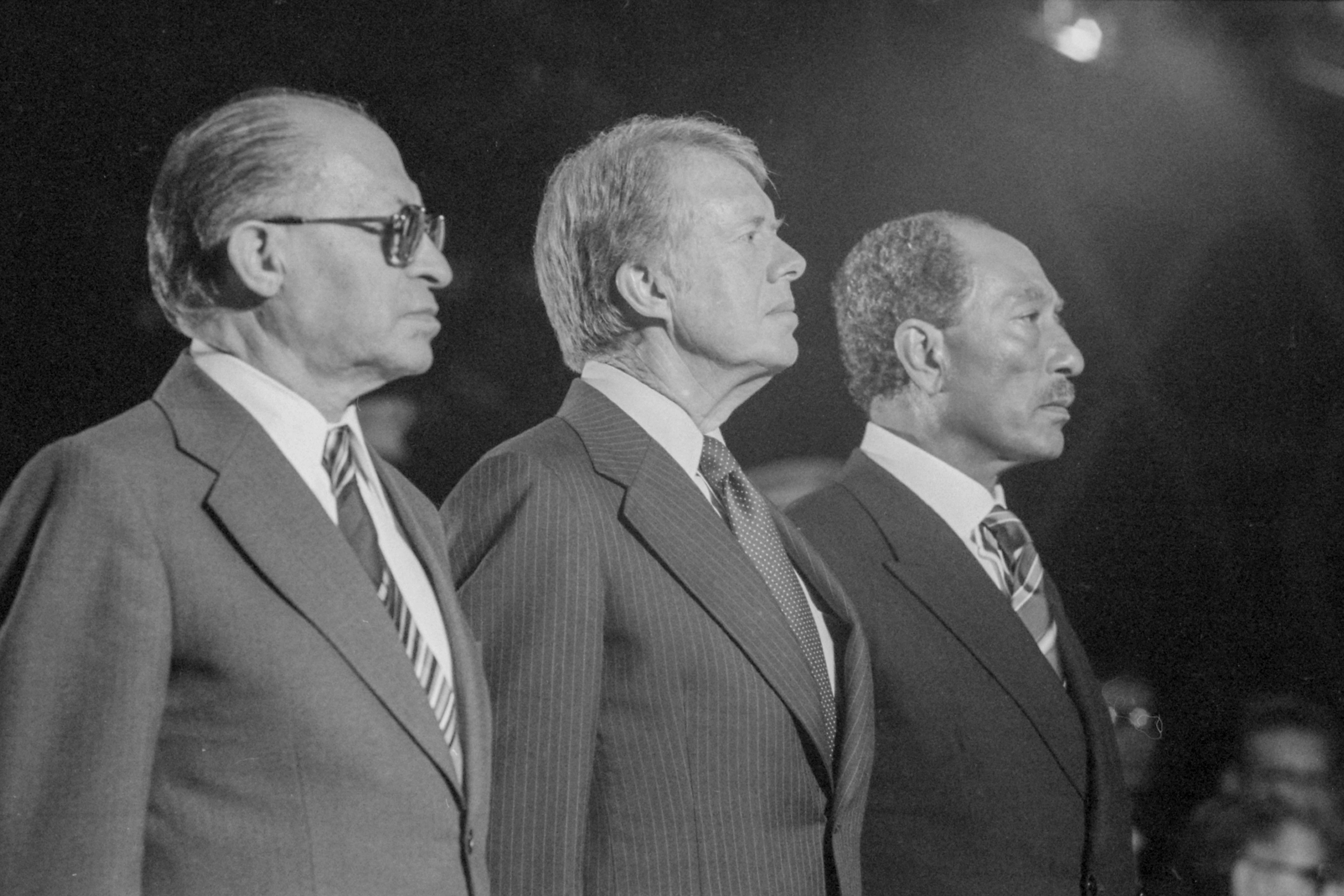
Celebrating the signing of the Camp David Accords: Menachem Begin, Jimmy Carter, Anwar Al Sadat.

In foreign relations Sadat instigated momentous change. President Sadat shifted Egypt from a policy of confrontation with Israel to one of peaceful accommodation through negotiations. Following the Sinai Disengagement Agreements of 1974 and 1975, Sadat created a fresh opening for progress by his dramatic visit to Jerusalem in November 1977. This led to the invitation from President Jimmy Carter of the United States to President Sadat and Israeli Prime Minister Begin to enter trilateral negotiations at Camp David.

The outcome was the historic Camp David accords, signed by Egypt and Israel and witnessed by the US on 17 September 1978. The accords led to 26 March 1979, signing of the Egypt–Israel peace treaty, by which Egypt regained control of the Sinai in May 1982. Throughout this period, US–Egyptian relations steadily improved, and Egypt became one of America's largest recipients of foreign aid. Sadat's willingness to break ranks by making peace with Israel earned him the enmity of most other Arab states, however. In 1977, Egypt fought a short border war with Libya.

Sadat used his immense popularity with the Egyptian people to try to push through vast economic reforms that ended the socialistic controls of Nasserism. Sadat introduced greater political freedom and a new economic policy, the most important aspect of which was the infitah or "open door". This relaxed government controls over the economy and encouraged private investment. While the reforms created a wealthy and successful upper class and a small middle class, these reforms had little effect upon the average Egyptian who began to grow dissatisfied with Sadat's rule. In 1977, Infitah policies led to massive spontaneous riots ('Bread Riots') involving hundreds of thousands of Egyptians when the state announced that it was retiring subsidies on basic foodstuffs.

Liberalization also included the reinstitution of due process and the legal banning of torture. Sadat dismantled much of the existing political machine and brought to trial a number of former government officials accused of criminal excesses during the Nasser era. Sadat tried to expand participation in the political process in the mid-1970s but later abandoned this effort. In the last years of his life, Egypt was wracked by violence arising from discontent with Sadat's rule and sectarian tensions, and it experienced a renewed measure of repression including extra judicial arrests.

==== Conflict with the Muslim Brotherhood ====
Another change Sadat made from the Nasser era was a bow towards the Islamic revival. Sadat loosened restrictions on the Muslim Brotherhood, allowing it to publish a monthly magazine, al-Dawa, which appeared regularly until September 1981 (although he did not allow the group's reconstitution.)

In the late 1970s, he began calling himself 'The Believer President' and signing his name Mohammad Anwar Sadat.' He ordered Egypt's state-run television to interrupt programs with Salat (call to prayer) on the screen five times a day and to increase religious programming. Under his rule local officials banned the sale of alcohol except at places catering to foreign tourists in more than half of Egypt's 26 governorates. 2

=== Mubarak era ===
==== Presidential inauguration ====
On 6 October 1981, President Sadat was assassinated by Islamic extremists. Hosni Mubarak, Vice President since 1975 and an air force commander during the October 1973 war, was elected president later that month. He was subsequently confirmed by popular referendum for three more 6-year terms, his last presidential referendum taking place in September 2005. The results of the referendums are however of questionable validity as they, with the exception of the one conducted in September 2005, listed only Mubarak as the sole candidate.

Mubarak maintained Egypt's commitment to the Camp David peace process, while at the same time re-establishing Egypt's position as an Arab leader. Egypt was readmitted to the Arab League in 1989. Egypt also has played a moderating role in such international forums as the UN and the Nonaligned Movement.

==== 1990s – economic reforms and struggle with radical Islamists ====
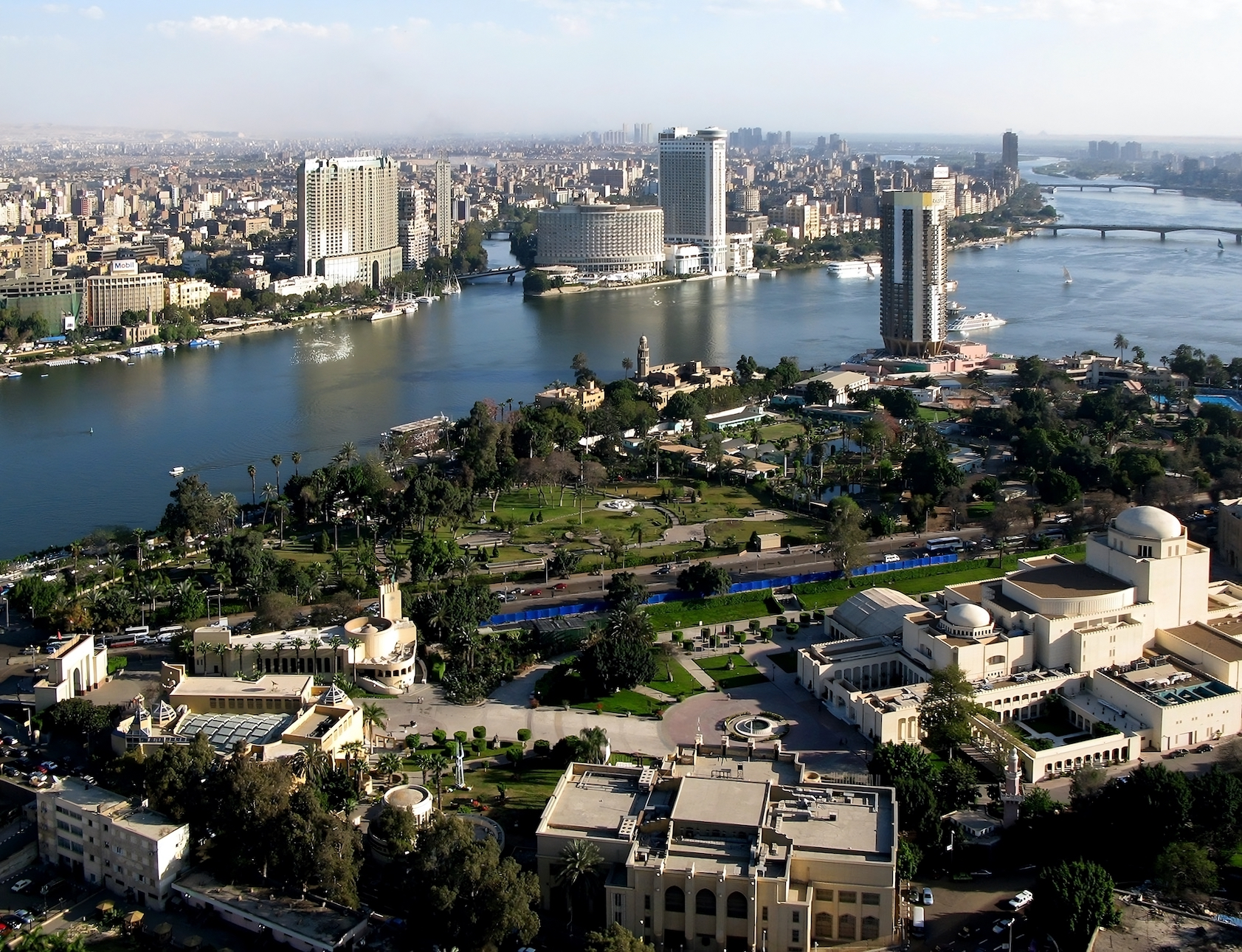
A section of present-day Cairo, as seen from the Cairo Tower.

From 1991, Mubarak undertook an ambitious domestic economic reform program to reduce the size of the public sector and expand the role of the private sector. During the 1990s, a series of International Monetary Fund arrangements, coupled with massive external debt relief resulting from Egypt's participation in the Gulf War coalition, helped Egypt improve its macroeconomic performance. The economy of Egypt flourished during the 1990s and 2000s. The Government of Egypt tamed inflation bringing it down from double-digit to a single digit. Gross domestic product (GDP) per capita based on purchasing-power-parity (PPP) increased fourfold between 1981 and 2006, from US$1355 in 1981, to US$2525 in 1991, to US$3686 in 2001 and to an estimated US$4535 in 2006.

There was less progress in political reform. The November 2000 People's Assembly elections saw 34 members of the opposition win seats in the 454-seat assembly, facing a clear majority of 388 ultimately affiliated with the ruling National Democratic Party (NDP). A constitutional amendment in May 2005 changed the presidential election to a multicandidate popular vote rather than a popular validation of a candidate nominated by the People's Assembly and on 7 September Mubarak was elected for another six-year term with 87 percent of the popular vote, followed by a distant but strong showing by Ayman Nour, leader of the opposition Ghad Party and a well-known rights activist.

Shortly after mounting an unprecedented presidential campaign, Nour was jailed on forgery charges critics called phony; he was released on 18 February 2009. Brotherhood members were allowed to run for parliament in 2005 as independents, garnering 88 seats, or 20 percent of the People's Assembly.

The opposition parties have been weak and divided and are not yet credible alternatives to the NDP. The Muslim Brotherhood, founded in Egypt in 1928, had remained an illegal organization and may not be recognized as a political party (current Egyptian law prohibits the formation of political parties based on religion). Members are known publicly and openly speak their views. Members of the Brotherhood have been elected to the People's Assembly and local councils as independents. The Egyptian political opposition also includes groups and popular movements such as Kefaya and the 6 April Youth Movement, although they are somewhat less organized than officially registered political parties. Bloggers, or cyberactivists as Courtney C. Radsch terms them, have also played an important political opposition role, writing, organizing, and mobilizing public opposition.

==== Decrease of influence ====
President Mubarak had tight, autocratic control over Egypt. However, a dramatic drop in support for Mubarak and his domestic economic reform program increased with surfacing news about his son Alaa being extremely corrupt and favored in government tenders and privatization. As Alaa started getting out of the picture by 2000, Mubarak's second son Gamal started rising in the National Democratic Party and succeeded in getting a newer generation of neo-liberals into the party and eventually the government. Gamal Mubarak branched out with a few colleagues to set up Medinvest Associates Ltd., which manages a private equity fund, and to do some corporate finance consultancy work.

=== Civil unrest 2011-2014 ===
==== 2011 revolution and aftermath ====
Beginning on 25 January 2011, a series of street demonstrations, protests, and civil disobedience acts have taken place in Egypt, with organizers counting on the Tunisian uprising to inspire the crowds to mobilize. The demonstrations and riots were reported to have started over police brutality, state of emergency laws, unemployment, desire to raise the minimum wage, lack of housing, food inflation, corruption, lack of freedom of speech, and poor living conditions. The protests' main goal was to oust President Hosni Mubarak's regime.

On 11 February 2011, Mubarak resigned and fled Cairo. Vice President Omar Suleiman announced that Mubarak had stepped down and that the Egyptian military would assume control of the nation's affairs in the short term. (See also 2011 revolution.) Jubilant celebrations broke out in Tahrir Square at the news. Mubarak may have left Cairo for Sharm el-Sheikh the previous night, before or shortly after the airing of a taped speech in which Mubarak vowed he would not step down or leave.

On 13 February 2011, the high level military command of Egypt announced that both the constitution and the parliament of Egypt had been dissolved. The parliamentary election was to be held in September.

A constitutional referendum was held on 19 March 2011. On 28 November 2011, Egypt held its first parliamentary election since the previous regime had been in power. Turnout was high and there were no reports of irregularities or violence, although members of some parties broke the ban on campaigning at polling places by handing out pamphlets and banners.

A constituent assembly, founded on 26 March 2012, started to work for implementing a new constitution. Presidential elections, were held in March–June 2012, with a final runoff between former prime minister Ahmed Shafik and Muslim Brotherhood parliamentarian Mohamed Morsi. On 24 June 2012, Egypt's election commission announced that Morsi had won the run-off. On 30 June 2012, Mohamed Morsi was sworn in as Egypt’s new president.

==== Morsi's presidency ====
On 8 July 2012, Egypt's new president Mohamed Morsi said that he's overriding a military edict that dissolved the country's elected parliament and calling on lawmakers back into session.

On 10 July 2012, the Supreme Constitutional Court of Egypt negated the decision by President Mohamed Morsi to call the nation's parliament back into session. On 2 August 2012, Egypt's Prime Minister Hisham Qandil announced his 35-member cabinet comprising 28 newcomers including four from the influential Muslim Brotherhood, six others and the former military ruler Tantawi as the Defence Minister from the previous Government.

==== 2012-2013 Egyptian protests ====
On 22 November 2012, Egyptian Mohamed Morsi issued a declaration immunizing his decrees from challenge and seeking to protect the work of the Constituent Assembly drafting the new constitution. The declaration also requires a retrial of those accused in the Mubarak-era killings of protesters, who had been acquitted, and extends the mandate of the constituent assembly by two months. Additionally, the declaration authorizes Morsi to take any measures necessary to protect the revolution. Liberal and secular groups previously walked out of the constitutional constituent assembly because they believed that it would impose strict Islamic practices, while Muslim Brotherhood backers threw their support behind Morsi.

A constitutional referendum was held in two rounds on 15 and 22 December 2012, with 64% support, and 33% against. It was signed into law by a presidential decree issued by Morsi on 26 December 2012.

The move has been criticized by Mohamed ElBaradei who stated "Morsi today usurped all state powers & appointed himself Egypt's new pharaoh" on his Twitter feed. The move has led to massive protests and violent action throughout Egypt.

==== After Morsi ====
On 30 June 2013, on the first anniversary of the election of Morsi, millions of protesters across Egypt took to the streets and demanded the immediate resignation of the president. On 1 July, the Egyptian Armed Forces issued a 48-hour ultimatum that gave the country's political parties until 3 July to meet the demands of the Egyptian people. The presidency rejected the Egyptian Army's 48-hour ultimatum, vowing that the president would pursue his own plans for national reconciliation to resolve the political crisis. On 3 July, General Abdel Fattah el-Sisi, head of the Egyptian Armed Forces, announced that he had removed Morsi from power, suspended the constitution and would be calling new presidential and Shura Council elections and named Supreme Constitutional Court's leader, Adly Mansour as acting president. Mansour was sworn in on 4 July 2013.

During the months after the coup d'état, a new constitution was prepared, which took effect on 18 January 2014. After that, presidential and parliamentary elections have to be held within 6 months.

=== El-Sisi Presidency ===
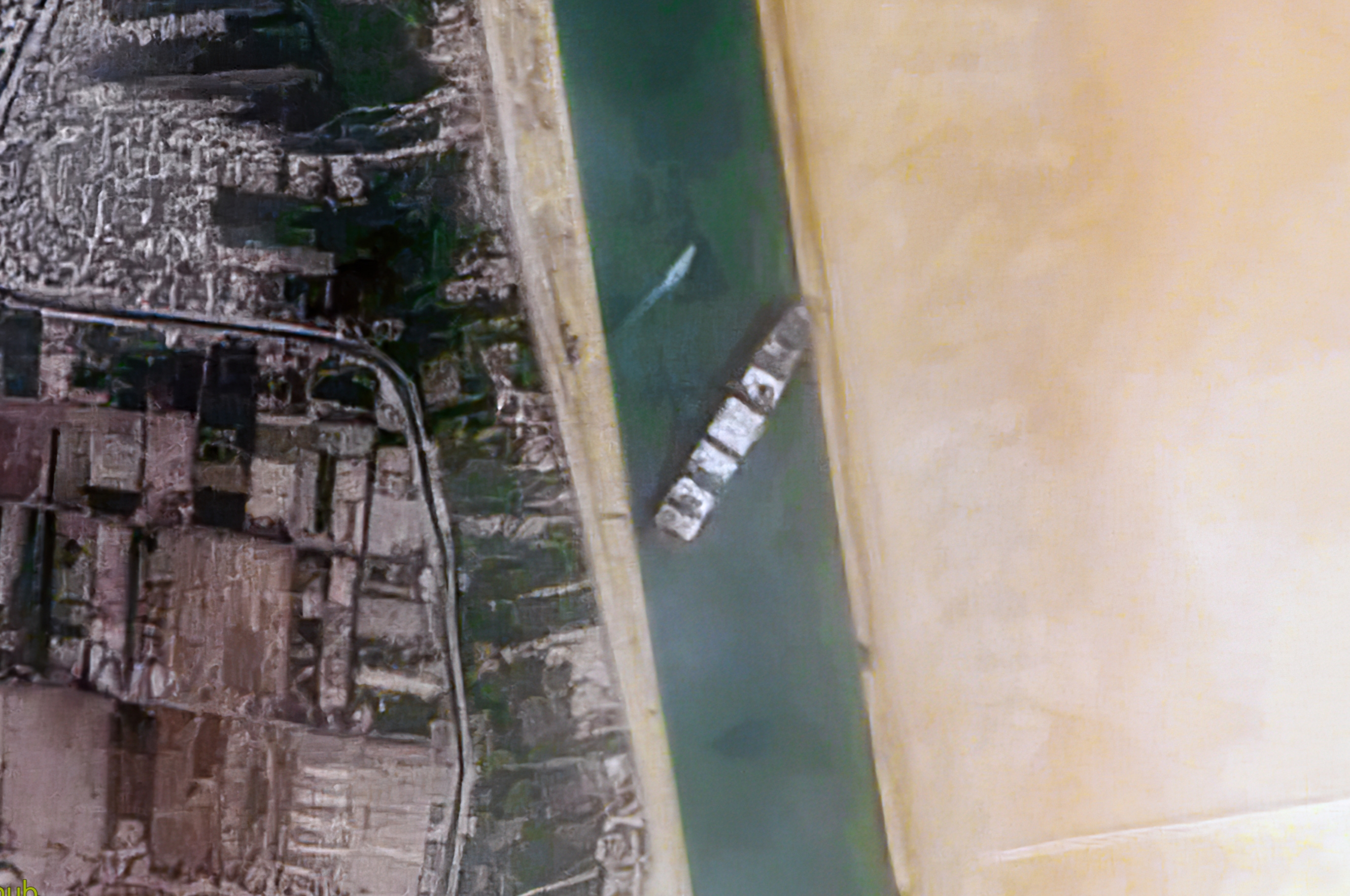
Satellite image of Ever Given blocking the canal in March 2021

In the elections of June 2014 El-Sisi won with a percentage of 96.1%. On 8 June 2014, Abdel Fatah el-Sisi was officially sworn in as Egypt's new president. Under President el-Sisi, Egypt has implemented a rigorous policy of controlling the border to the Gaza Strip, including the dismantling of tunnels between the Gaza strip and Sinai.

In April 2018, El-Sisi was re-elected by landslide in election with no real opposition. In April 2019, Egypt’s parliament extended presidential terms from four to six years. President Abdel Fattah al-Sisi was also allowed to run for third term in next election in 2024.

Under El-Sisi Egypt is said to have returned to authoritarianism. New constitutional reforms have been implemented, meaning strengthening the role of military and limiting the political opposition. The constitutional changes were accepted in a referendum in April 2019.

In December 2020, final results of the parliamentary election confirmed a clear majority of the seats for Egypt’s Mostaqbal Watn (Nation’s Future) Party, which strongly supports president El-Sisi. The party even increased its majority, partly because of new electoral rules.

During the 2020–2021 Tigray War, Egypt was also involved. On 19 December 2020, an EEPA report stated, based on testimonials of three Egyptian officials and one European diplomat, that the UAE used its base in Assab (Eritrea) to launch drones strikes against Tigray. The investigative platform Bellingcat confirmed the presence of Chinese-produced drones at the UAE's military base in Assab, Eritrea. Egyptian officials were concerned about strengthening ties between the UAE and Israel. They fear that both countries will collaborate in the construction of an alternative to the Suez Canal, starting from Haifa in Israel. On 19 December 2020, Egypt was reportedly encouraging Sudan to support the TPLF in Tigray. It wants to strengthen a joint position in relation to negotiations on the GERD Dam, which impacts both countries downstream.

== See also ==
- History of Egypt
- Egyptian Constitution of 1923
- Liberalism in Egypt
- Terrorism in Egypt
