= Will of a Generation Party =

Will of a Generation Party Hizb Eradet Geel حزب إرادة جيل
- Abbreviation: EGP
- Chairman: Tayseer Matar
- Secretary-General: Mohamed Tayseer Matar
- Deputy Chairman: Mohsen El-Faham
- Founders: Tayseer Matar
- Founded: 25 December 2018; 7 years ago
- Headquarters: 14 Fouad Serag El-Din Street, Garden City, Cairo
- Ideology: Egyptian nationalism; Statism; Pragmatism
- Political position: Centre
- National affiliation: National Unified List for Egypt (since 2020)
- Colors: Black; Red; White; Yellow
- Slogan: "You Must Participate"; Arabic: لازم تشارك
- House of Representatives: 2 / 596
- Senate: 1 / 300

Website
- https://www.eradetgel.com/

The Will of a Generation Party (Arabic: حزب إرادة جيل, romanized: Ḥizb irādat jīl), also known as the Eradet Geel Party, is an Egyptian political party founded in December 2018.

== History ==
The party was formally established under its current name on 25 December 2018, following the approval of the Political Parties Affairs Committee to rename the "Free Social Constitutional Party" to "Will of a Generation (Eradet Geel)."

Headed by Senator Tayseer Matar, the party established its headquarters in the Garden City district of Cairo and positioned itself politically within the pro-state alliance. It serves as the administrative hub for the "Egyptian Parties Alliance," a coalition comprising over 40 political entities.

In the 2020 parliamentary elections, the party joined the "National List for Egypt" coalition, and had one candidate run for individual seats. The party secured representation in both the Senate and the House of Representatives. During the 2025 electoral cycle, the party organized its activities and voter mobilization efforts under the slogan "You Must Participate." It won one elected seat in the parliament.

== Electoral history ==
=== House of Representatives elections ===
Election	Votes	%	Seats	+/–
2020			1 / 596	▲1
2025			2 / 596	▲1

=== Senate elections ===
Election	Votes	%	Seats	+/–
2020			1 / 300	▲1
2025			1 / 300	▲0
