= Egyptian Freedom Party =

Egyptian Freedom Party حزب الحرية المصري
- Chairman: Mamdouh Hassan
- General Secretary: Moatz Hassan
- Founded: 17 July 2011
- Split from: National Democratic Party
- Headquarters: Cairo
- Ideology: Liberalism
- Political position: Centre
- National affiliation: National Unified List for Egypt (since 2020)
- House of Representatives: 2 / 596
- Senate: 1 / 300

Website
- www.alhoriaparty.com

The Egyptian Freedom Party (Arabic: حزب الحرية المصري, romanized: Hizb al-Horreya) is an Egyptian political party.

== History ==
It was founded on 17 July 2011 and consists of remnants of the formerly dominant National Democratic Party, which was dissolved following the 2011 Egyptian revolution. The party's chairman is Mamdouh Hassan, its secretary general was his brother Moatz Hassan.

Many former NDP MPs joined this party. In the elections for the People's Assembly from November 2011 through January 2012, the Freedom Party won 1.9% of the popular vote and five out of 498 elected seats. The party also gained votes from the Coptic Christian community by placing Copts on the top of their electoral lists.

The party joined the National Unified List for Egypt for the 2020 Egyptian parliamentary election and the 2025 Egyptian parliamentary election.

== Election results ==
=== People's Assembly elections ===
Election	Seats	+/–
2011–12 Egyptian parliamentary election	4	▲4

=== House of Representatives elections ===
Election	Seats	+/–
2020 Egyptian parliamentary election	7	▲3
2025 Egyptian parliamentary election	2	▼5

=== Shura Council elections ===
Election	Seats	+/–
2012 Egyptian Shura Council election	3	▲3

=== Senate elections ===
Election	Seats	+/–
2020 Egyptian Senate election	1	▼2
2025 Egyptian Senate election	1	▲0
