= National Unified List for Egypt =

Egyptian electoral alliance

- Founded: 2020
- Political position: Big tent

The National Unified List for Egypt, also known as the National Unified Coalition, is an electoral alliance in Egypt which has contested various elections since its formation in 2020.

== History ==
The alliance first formed ahead of the 2020 Egyptian parliamentary election.

The list also ran in the 2020 Egyptian Senate election. The Homeland Defenders Party withdrew from the list, as it felt that it was not allocated a fair number of seats.

The National Unified List participated in the 2025 Egyptian Senate election and won seats through the list system and the individual system during the first round of the election. The list included Tagammu and the New Wafd Party, which had previously been opposition parties.

The list swept the second phase of the 2025 Egyptian parliamentary election, though all other party lists that ran were disqualified.

== Electoral history ==
=== House of Representatives elections ===
Election	Seats	+/–	Result
2020			
2025			

=== Senate elections ===
Election	Seats	+/–	Result
2020			
2025			

== Affiliated parties ==
The following parties were part of the alliance during the 2020 parliamentary election: Nation's Future Party, New Wafd Party, Homeland Defenders Party, Modern Egypt Party, Egyptian Social Democratic Party, Republican People's Party, Reform and Development Party, Tagammu, Will of a Generation Party, Egyptian Freedom Party, Justice Party and the Egyptian Congress Party.

The following parties were part of the alliance during the 2020 senate election: Republican People's Party, New Wafd Party, Egyptian Congress Party, El-Ghad Party, Egyptian Social Democratic Party, Egyptian National Movement, Modern Egypt Party, Coordination Committee of Party’s Youth Leaders and Politicians, Reform and Development Party, Nation's Future Party and the Justice Party.

The following parties were part of the alliance during the 2025 parliamentary election: Nation's Future Party, National Front, Homeland Defenders Party, Republican People's Party, New Wafd Party, Tagammu Party, Egyptian Social Democratic Party, Justice Party, Reform and Development Party, Will of a Generation Party, Egyptian Freedom Party, Egyptian Congress Party and the Coordination Committee for Parties’ Youth.
