= Abdel-Moneim Imam =

Egyptian politician

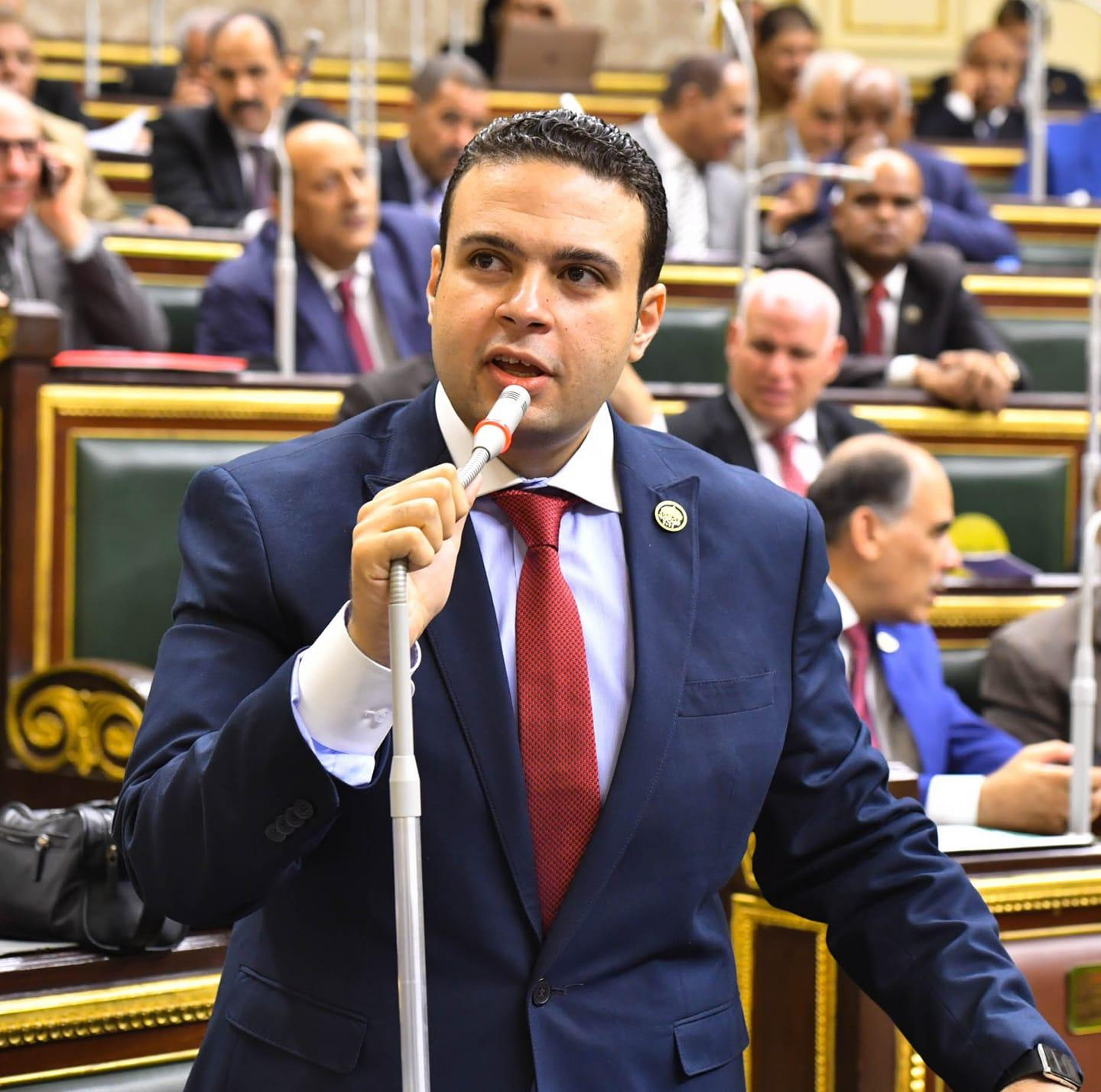
- Abdel-Moneim Imam

Member of the House of Representatives
- Constituency: New Cairo

President of the Justice Party

Personal details
- Party: Justice Party
- Occupation: Politician

Abdel-Moneim Imam is an Egyptian politician and member of the Parliament of Egypt. He is the president of the Justice Party and serves as deputy chairman of the Parliament’s Budget Committee.

He is known for his focus on labour rights, social welfare, and economic policy. He has supported initiatives aimed at improving wages and working conditions for workers in Egypt.

He has also spoken on economic issues such as public debt and government spending, warning about the long-term impact of rising debt on future generations.

== Political career ==
Imam is a leading figure in the Justice Party, which emerged after the 2011 Egyptian revolution. The party positions itself as a centrist political movement and participates in parliamentary coalitions and alliances.

Within the House of Representatives, he serves as deputy chairman of the Budget Committee, participating in discussions on state finances, economic policy, and public expenditure.

He has been involved in parliamentary debates on social justice, labour protections, and economic development.

== Political positions ==
=== Labour and social policy ===
Imam has advocated for improved labour conditions in Egypt, including higher wages and stronger workplace protections. He has also supported broader social safety measures for workers.

=== Economic policy ===
He has expressed concern over rising public debt and its impact on long-term economic stability. He has called for more sustainable fiscal policies and responsible government spending.

== Justice Party ==
The Justice Party is an Egyptian political party founded following the 2011 Egyptian revolution. It advocates for civil liberties, democratic governance, and social justice.

Abdel-Moneim Imam serves as the party’s president and represents it in the House of Representatives.

== See also ==
- Politics of Egypt
- Parliament of Egypt
- 2011 Egyptian revolution
