= Sadat Democratic Party =

Political party in Egypt

- Leader: Effat Al Sadat
- National affiliation: For the Love of Egypt
- House of Representatives: 0 / 596

The Sadat Democratic Party is a political party in Egypt.

== History ==
The party supported Abdel Fattah el-Sisi in the 2014 Egyptian presidential election and joined the For the Love of Egypt alliance ahead of the 2015 Egyptian parliamentary election.
