= National Front Party (Egypt) =

National Front Party حزب الجبهة الوطنية
- Abbreviation: NFP
- Chairman: Assem el Gazzar
- Secretary-General: El Sayed El Quseir
- Deputy Chairman: Mahmoud el Sharawyy
- Founders: Assem el Gazzar
- Founded: 30 December 2024; 14 months ago
- Headquarters: 90 North Road, New Cairo, Cairo
- Ideology: Pragmatism
- Political position: Big tent
- National affiliation: National Unified List for Egypt (since 2025)
- Colors: Black; Red; Gold
- Slogan: "Egypt for all" Arabic: مصر للجميع
- House of Representatives: 70 / 596
- Senate: 22 / 300

Website
- https://algabhaalwataniya.com/

The National Front Party (Arabic: حزب الجبهة الوطنية, romanized: Ḥizb al-Jabhah al-Waṭanīyah) is an Egyptian political party founded in December 2024.

== History ==
The party's formation was announced at a public ceremony held in a hotel in the New Administrative Capital, which was attended by a significant number of politicians, public figures, and members of the Egyptian parliament (both the House of Representatives and the Senate).

Immediately following the launch, the party rapidly expanded and began establishing headquarters in Cairo and various governorates to formally collect member registration forms (Arabic: توكيلات تأسيس). The former Minister of Housing, Assem el Gazzar, was named as the agent for the party's founders.

Composed largely of former government officials, the party is perceived by independent media as an extension of the political influence of Ibrahim al-Arjani, a powerful Egyptian businessman, close friend of President Abdel Fattah el-Sisi and a prominent former military partner in Egypt's war on terror in Sinai. Its formation is viewed by an anonymous opposition leader as a way to create a party that would not be closely tied to the security services, in contrast to the Nation's Future Party.

The party secured a place in the senate after the 2025 Egyptian Senate election and ran in the 2025 Egyptian parliamentary election as part of the National Unified List for Egypt, placing third and winning 65 elected seats.

== Electoral history ==
=== House of Representatives ===
| Election | Seats | | Government |
| Election | Seats | +/- | Government |
|---|---|---|---|
| 2025 | 70 / 596 | ▲70 | Majority |

=== Senate ===
| Election year | Seats won | +/- | Position |
|---|---|---|---|
| 2025 | 22 / 300 | ▲22 | Majority |
