= Conservative Party (Egypt) =

Political party in Egypt

Conservative Party حزب المحافظين
- President: Akmal Kortam
- Founded: 13 March 2006
- Headquarters: Cairo
- Ideology: Conservatism
- Political position: Right-wing
- National affiliation: Free Path Alliance
- House of Representatives: 1 / 596

The Conservative Party (Arabic: حزب المحافظين Hizb Al-Mohafezeen) is a political party in Egypt.

== History ==
The party was founded by Mostafa Abdel Aziz, a writer and journalist. In its foundation the party included many notable Egyptian journalists and public figures. The current leader, Akmal Kortam, was an influential member of the National Democratic Party. The party froze all activities in 2010, as a rejection of the political and security laws that were forced upon other political parties in that era by the former Mubarak regime. The party became active again following the 2011 Egyptian revolution.

It joined the For the Love of Egypt list in 2015.

The party has served as part of the Egyptian opposition to president Abdel Fattah el-Sisi.

It formed an alliance called the Free Path Alliance with the Constitution Party to run for individual seats in the 2025 Egyptian parliamentary election. The party won a seat in parliament.

The party will hold a party leadership election on 10 March 2026, with nominations open from 1 February until 15 February; the election result will be announced on 15 March. Elections for the "deputy leader" of the party and the party's "Supreme Council" are also expected to be held.

== Electoral history ==
=== People's Assembly elections ===
Election	Seats	+/–
2011–12	1 / 596	▲1

=== House of Representatives elections ===
Election	Seats	+/–
2015	6 / 596	▲5
2020	0 / 596	▼6
2025	1 / 596	▲1
