= Revolution Egypt Party =

Political party in Egypt

Revolutionary Egypt Party Elmasreen
- Leader: Hussein Abu Al-Atta
- Founded: July 2011
- Ideology: Constitutional democracy Parliamentary republic Government intervention
- National affiliation: Social Justice coalition
- House of Representatives: 0 / 568

Website
- https://www.almsryeen.com

The Revolutionary Egypt Party (Arabic: حزب المصريين) is a political party that calls for the establishment of a presidential parliamentary system, "an independent judiciary system" and an economic system where the state intervenes to prevent monopolization. It is currently led by Hussein Abu Al-Atta.

The name of the Egyptian Revolution Party was changed to the Egyptians Party in May 2019. In 2023, Hussein Abu Al-Atta, the Egyptians Party leader, indicated support for President Abdel Fattah el-Sisi's 2024 presidential run.
