= Homeland Defenders Party =

Political party in Egypt

Homeland Defenders Party حزب حماة الوطن
- Leader: Mohamed Abbas Helmy Hashem
- Founded: 2013
- Ideology: Centrism
- National affiliation: Call of Egypt; National Unified List for Egypt (since 2020)
- Colors: Crimson Red, Black
- House of Representatives: 91 / 596
- Senate: 72 / 300

Website
- humatalwatan.com

The Homeland Defenders Party (Arabic: حزب حماة الوطن), also translated as Protectors of the Nation, and Guardians of the Nation, is a centrist political party in Egypt.

== History ==
It was founded in 2013 by Galal Haridy and a group of retired officers. In an interview in December 2013, about half a year after Abdel Fattah el-Sisi military coup, Haridy expressed support for the "efforts made by the army and police in confronting terrorism."

It is currently the largest member party of the Call of Egypt coalition and is seen as supportive towards President Abdel Fattah el-Sisi.

The party joined the National Unified List for Egypt in 2020, ahead of the parliamentary election that year.

Ahmed El Awadi, the deputy chair of the party, was appointed in October 2025 as one of the deputy speakers in the Senate.

The party was part of the National Unified List for Egypt and won 86 elected seats in the 2025 parliamentary election.

== Leadership ==
The party was headed by Galal Haridy; his death was announced by the party in January 2026. Mohamed Abbas Helmy Hashem is now the current leader since 29 September 2025.

== Electoral history ==
=== House of Representatives elections ===
Election	Seats	+/–	Result
2015	18 / 596	▲18	Majority
2020	23 / 596	▲5	Majority
2025	91 / 596	▲68	Majority

=== Senate elections ===
Election	Seats	+/–	Result
2020	11 / 300	▲11	Majority
2025	44 / 300	▲33	Majority
