= Consciousness Party =

Political party in Egypt

Consciousness Party حزب الوعي
- Leader: Mahmoud Taher; Shady El-Ghazaly Harb (formerly); Hossam Badrawy (formerly)
- Founded: 2011
- House of Representatives: 1 / 596

The Consciousness Party, also translated as the Awareness Party, is a political party in Egypt founded in 2011.

== History ==
The party was originally part of the Egyptian Bloc alliance that ran in the 2011–2012 Egyptian parliamentary election, though only three parties (the Free Egyptians Party, the Egyptian Social Democratic Party and the Tagammu Party) were ultimately part of that alliance. The party was almost last in Ismailia Governorate during that election.

== Electoral history ==
=== House of Representatives elections ===
Election	Seats	+/–
2025	1 / 596	▲1
