= Assem el Gazzar =

Egyptian politician (born 1967)

- عاصم الجزار
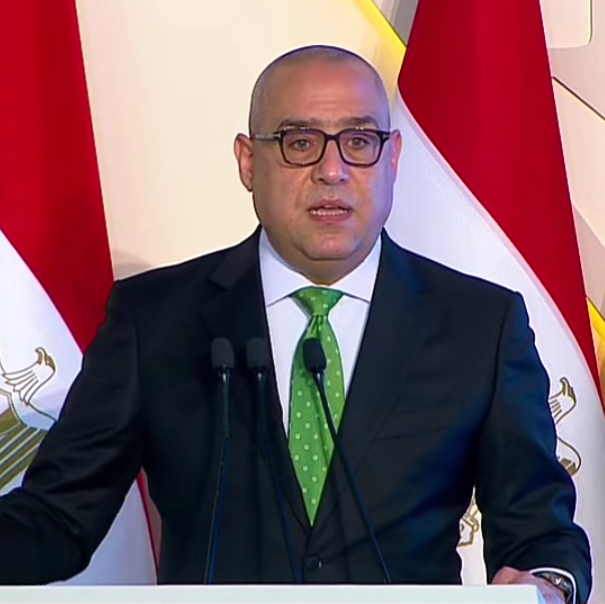

Minister of Housing, Utilities & Urban Communities
- In office 14 February 2019 – 2 July 2024
- President: Abdel Fattah el-Sisi
- Prime Minister: Mostafa Madbouly
- Preceded by: Mostafa Madbouly
- Succeeded by: Sharif El-Sherbini

Personal details
- Born: 20 August 1967 Cairo, Egypt
- Education: Cairo University

Assem el Gazzar (Arabic: عاصم الجزار; born 20 August 1967) was the Minister of Housing, Utilities & Urban Communities of Egypt in the cabinet headed by Mostafa Madbouly.

El Gazzar was appointed as the Deputy Housing Minister in January 2018. He was sworn in as the minister of housing as a successor to Prime Minister Mostafa Madbouly.

He was one of the founders of the National Front Party, which launched in December 2024.

El Gazzar was elected deputy speaker in the House of Representatives on 12 January 2026, alongside Mohamed Elwahsh.
