= National Elections Authority =

Election commission of Egypt

- الهيئة الوطنية للانتخابات

Agency overview
- Type: Election commission
- Jurisdiction: Egypt
- Agency executive: Lashin Ibrahim, Chairman
- Website: elections.eg

The National Elections Authority (Egyptian Arabic: الهيئة الوطنية للانتخابات) is the body responsible for managing and supervising the electoral process in Egypt. The Commission is specialized in the presidential, parliamentary and local elections and referendums. The Commission was established in accordance with Law 198 of 2017, as an alternative to the Supreme Elections Committee and the Presidential Election Committee.
