= Nation's Future Party =

Political party in Egypt

Nation's Future Party حزب مستقبل وطن
- Chairman: Abdel-Wahab Abdel-Razeq
- Secretary-General: Hossam El-Khouly
- Deputy Chairman: Ashraf Rashad
- Founders: Mohamed Badran; Ahmed Shaaban
- Founded: November 2014; 11 years ago
- Headquarters: Talaat Harb axis, Heliopolis, Cairo
- Newspaper: Mostaqbal Watan News (online) مستقبل وطن نيوز
- Youth wing: Nation's Future Youth
- Ideology: Egyptian nationalism; Post-Islamism; Militarism
- Political position: Centre-right to right-wing
- National affiliation: For the Love of Egypt (2014–2018); National Unified List for Egypt (since 2020)
- Colors: Navy Blue; Sky Blue
- Slogan: "We all are working for Egypt"; Arabic: كلنا نعمل من أجل مصر
- House of Representatives: 231 / 596
- Senate: 104 / 300

Website
- www.mostaqbalwatan.com

The Nation's Future Party (Arabic: حزب مستقبل وطن), also known as the Future of a Nation Party, the Future of the Homeland Party, the Homeland's Future Party, and transliterated as Mostaqbal Watan, is an Egyptian political party. The party is often seen as a "party of power", created for the sole purpose of backing President Abdel Fattah el-Sisi and his policies.

Originally a minor party, it has grown to become Egypt's largest political party and currently controls the majority of seats in the House of Representatives and a plurality of seats in the Senate. The dominant role of the Nation's Future Party in modern Egyptian politics has been compared to that of the National Democratic Party, which ruled from 1978 until the 2011 revolution.

== History ==
Nation's Future Party was set up in mid-2014 by Egyptian Military Intelligence. Abdel Azim, a former member of Abdel Fattah el-Sisi's presidential campaign, told Mada Masr:

An aide to the president in the presidency told me literally, 'The Nation's Future Party was originally the Nation's Future Front, established by Military Intelligence as a youth entity to support the president. It's ours'.

— Abdel Azim,

A student responsible for Nation's Future Party campaigning in his governorate was interviewed by Mada Masr. He stated that a Military Intelligence officer in civilian clothes frequently delivered cash payments of typically E£20,000 to the campaign office, and later on cheques, including one from the National Bank of Egypt for E£150,000. For each street march, E£15,000 to E£20,000 would be delivered, and young men organised by government agencies would be paid E£100 each to participate in the marches. Instead of being run by volunteers, the campaign office was staffed by civil servants. Campaigning for signatures for Sisi's presidential candidacy by Nation's Future Party included payments of E£50 to each person signing. Party leader Mohamed Badran took his instructions, according to the interviewee, from Major Ahmed Shaaban of Military Intelligence.

The Nation's Future Party ran in the 2015 parliamentary elections as part of the "For the Love of Egypt" electoral alliance, which won all 120 party seats in the parliament. The party won 43 individual seats and eight seats via the party list system.

In 2018, after all political parties, except for the Ghad Party led by Moussa Mostafa Moussa, failed to field candidates for the presidential election in March that year, calls to merge Egypt's 104 political parties into four or five strong parties increased. In response, efforts to strengthen the presence of powerful parties in the Egyptian political scene, primarily led by the Free Egyptians Party, the Nation's Future Party, and the New Wafd Party—as well as the Support Egypt Coalition, which holds 400 out of 597 seats in the Egyptian parliament—began.

The Nation's Future Party and the For the Love of Egypt alliance announced that the alliance would merge into the party. Following the announcement, around 50 MPs resigned from their parties in May 2018 and joined the Nation's Future Party; most of these came from the Free Egyptians and Wafd parties but there were many independents and other party members. 150 independent MPs became part of the party.

In the 2020 Egyptian parliamentary election, the Nation's Future Party grew significantly and won a majority of seats in the House of Representatives. It formed the National Unified List for Egypt alongside other parties. The party was part of the National Unified List for Egypt during the 2020 Egyptian Senate election and won 149 seats.

The party won 18 of 25 committee chairs in the parliament in October 2022.

In October 2023, President El-Sisi announced that he will run for a third term in the 2023 Egyptian presidential election. El-Sisi was allied with the Nation's Future Party going into the election and he won with 89% of the vote.

The party won 17 of 25 committee chairs in the parliament in October 2024.

The Nation's Future Party was part of the National Unified List for Egypt during the 2025 Egyptian Senate election and won 104 seats. It was part of the alliance during the 2025 Egyptian parliamentary election and won 227 elected seats.

The party won 12 committee chairs in the parliament in January 2026, with its allies Homeland Defenders Party winning six, the National Front Party winning four, and the Republican People’s Party winning one committee seat, respectively.

== Leaders ==
Leader		Took office	Left office
1	Mohamed Badran	ca. 2014	September 2016
2	Ashraf Rashad (acting)	September 2016	September 2017
3	Ashraf Rashad	September 2017	ca. 2020
4	Abdel-Wahab Abdel-Razeq	March 2020	Present

== Policies ==
=== The Egyptian Armed Forces ===
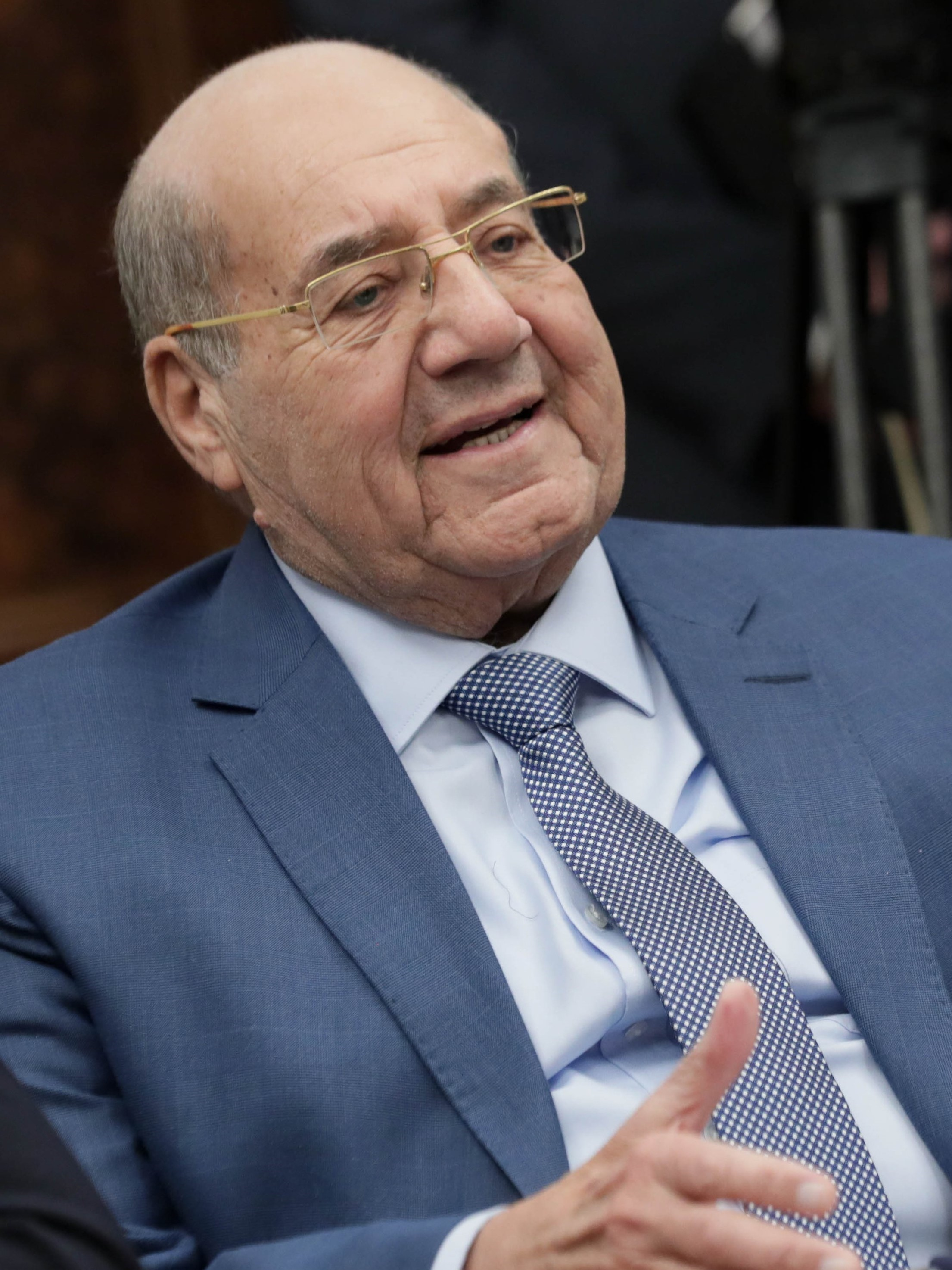
Abdel-Wahab Abdel-Razek, the party's leader and President of the Senate until 2025

The party supports the Egyptian Armed Forces, believing Egyptians need to unite behind the army and the Egyptian National Police in their fight against terrorism in defence of the nation.

=== Economic reforms ===
Party leaders have often stated their support for the IMF-backed economic reform program, believing it is the only way to help Egypt recover from the effects of the 2011 revolution and to create a modern, powerful Egyptian state despite the resulting hardships.

=== Foreign affairs ===
Reaching out to African states has also been a priority. The party has regularly lobbied the government to improve relations with the African continent, which were arguably non-existent for the latter part of the Mubarak era. The party regularly sends diplomatic delegations to foreign countries in preparation for state visits by the president of Egypt.

== Electoral history ==
=== Presidential ===
Election	Candidate	First round		Second round		Result
Election	Candidate	Votes	%	Votes	%	Result
2018	Supported Abdel Fattah el-Sisi (Note: Sisi chose to run as an independent candidate while his campaign was endorsed and funded by Nation's Future Party.)	21,835,387	97.08	—N/a		Won
2023	In Alliance with Abdel Fattah el-Sisi	39,702,451	89.65	—N/a		Won

=== House of Representatives ===
Election	Leader	Seats		Government
Election	Leader	Seats	+/-	Government
2015	Ashraf Rashad	53 / 596	▲53	Majority
2020	Ashraf Rashad	316 / 596	▲263	Majority
2025	Abdel-Wahab Abdel-Razeq	231 / 596	▼85	Majority

=== Senate ===
Election year	Seats won	+/-	Position
2020	149 / 300	▲149	Majority
2025	104 / 300	▼45	Majority
