= National Progressive Unionist Rally Party =

Egyptian political party

National Progressive Unionist Rally Party حزب التجمع الوطني التقدمي الوحدوي
- Abbreviation: Tagammu (تجمع)
- President: Sayed Abdel Aal
- Founder: Khaled Mohieddin; Kamal Rifaat
- Founded: 1977; 49 years ago
- Preceded by: Arab Socialist Union
- Headquarters: Cairo
- Newspaper: Al Ahali
- Youth wing: Union of Progressive Youth
- Women's wing: Progressive Women's Union
- Ideology: Socialism
- Political position: Left-wing
- National affiliation: Arab Socialist Union (1976–1978); National Front Alliance; National Unified List for Egypt (since 2020)
- Regional affiliation: PSOM (historical)
- Colours: Red
- House of Representatives: 5 / 596
- Senate: 2 / 300

Website
- altagamoa.org

The National Progressive Unionist Rally Party (Arabic: حزب التجمع الوطني التقدمي الوحدوي, romanized: Ḥizb al-Tagammu' al-Watani al-Taqadomi al-Wahdawi, commonly referred to as Tagammu, meaning "Rally" in English) is an Egyptian left-wing political party. Originally known as the National Progressive Unionist Rally Organization, it was established as the left-wing faction of the governing Arab Socialist Union (ASU) and became an independent party after ASU's dissolution.

The party considers itself a defender of the principles of the Egyptian Revolution of 1952. It calls for standing against attempts to reverse the revolution's social gains for labourers, the poor, and other low-income groups.

== History and profile ==
The party was established in 1977. The founders were two former Free Officers members, Khaled Mohieddin and Kamal Rifaat. Its membership consisted of mainly Marxists and Nasserists.

Since 1978 the party has published a newspaper, Al Ahali.

The party boycotted the first presidential elections in 2005. It won 5 out of 518 seats during the 2010 legislative elections.

In the 2011–12 Egyptian parliamentary election, the party was initially a member of the Democratic Alliance for Egypt before it withdrew and ran in the Egyptian Bloc electoral alliance.

The party was one of the founding members of the Egyptian Front in August 2014 in preparation for the 2015 Egyptian parliamentary election. However, in late 2014, it withdrew from the Egyptian Front. A member of the party was removed from the For the Love of Egypt list before the electoral deadline.

The party became part of the National Unified List for Egypt in 2020, before the 2020 Egyptian parliamentary election.

It also joined the list ahead of the 2025 Egyptian parliamentary election and won five seats in the election.

== Platform ==
- Rejection of religious extremism.
- Building the character of the Egyptian citizens.
- Ending the state monopoly over the media.
- Raising awareness of environmental issues.
- Developing the Egyptian industries.

== Prominent party figures ==
- Khaled Mohieddin – Party founder, former chairman, and a member of the Egyptian Revolutionary Command Council
- Kamal Rifaat – Party founder
- Sayed Abdel Aal- New Party Chairman
- Ismail Sabri Abdullah – Member

== Electoral history ==
=== Presidential elections ===
| Election | Party candidate | Votes | % | Result |
|---|---|---|---|---|
| 2012 | Hisham Bastawisy | 29,189 | 0.13% | Lost ✗ |

=== People's Assembly of Egypt elections ===
| Election | Party leader | Votes | % | Seats | +/– | Position |
|---|---|---|---|---|---|---|
| 1976 | Khaled Mohieddin | as part of ASU | | 3 / 360 | ▲3 | ▲3rd |
| 1984 | Khaled Mohieddin | 214,587 | 4.2% | 0 / 458 | Steady | ▼4th |
| 1987 | Khaled Mohieddin | 150,570 | 2.2% | 0 / 458 | Steady | 4th |
| 1990 | Khaled Mohieddin | | | 6 / 454 | ▲6 | ▲2nd |
| 1995 | Khaled Mohieddin | | | 5 / 454 | ▼1 | ▼3rd |
| 2000 | Khaled Mohieddin | | | 6 / 454 | ▲1 | 3rd |
| 2005 | Khaled Mohieddin | | | 2 / 454 | ▼4 | 3rd |
| 2010 | Khaled Mohieddin | | | 5 / 518 | ▲3 | 3rd |
| 2011–2012 | Khaled Mohieddin | 2,402,238 | 8.9% as part of Egyptian Bloc | 4 / 508 | ▼1 | ▼4th |

=== House of Representatives elections ===
| Election | Party leader | Votes | % | Seats | +/– | Position |
|---|---|---|---|---|---|---|
| 2015 | Khaled Mohieddin | | | 2 / 599 | ▼2 | ▼17th |
| 2020 | Sayed Abdel Aal | | | 6 / 596 | ▲4 | ▲14th |
| 2025 | Sayed Abdel Aal | | as part of National Unified List for Egypt | 5 / 596 | ▼1 | |

=== Shura Council elections ===
| Election | Party leader | Seats | +/– | |
|---|---|---|---|---|
| 2007 | Khaled Mohieddin | 1 / 88 | ▲1 | 3rd |
| 2010 | Khaled Mohieddin | 1 / 132 | Steady | ▲2nd |
| 2012 | Khaled Mohieddin | 8 / 270 | ▲7 | |

== See also ==
- Egypt Arab Socialist Party
- Liberal Socialists Party
