= House of Representatives (Egypt) =

Lower house of Egypt's parliament

Coordinates: 30.04007°N 31.23658°E

House of Representatives مجلس النواب Maglis El Nowwab

Type
- Type: Lower house

Leadership
- Speaker: Hisham Badawy since 12 January 2026
- Deputy Speaker: Assem el Gazzar since 12 January 2026
- Deputy Speaker: Mohamed Elwahsh since 12 January 2026

Structure
- Seats: 596
- Political groups: Government (Second Madbouly Cabinet) (447): Nation's Future (231); Homeland Defenders (91); National Front (70); Republican People’s (28); New Wafd (12); Al-Nour (6); Congress (4); Will of a Generation (2); Freedom (2); Consciousness (1); Opposition (40): Social Democratic (12); Reform and Development (11); Justice (11); Tagammu (5); Conservative (1); Independents (109)

Elections
- Last election: 10–11 and 24–25 November 2025
- Next election: 2030

Meeting place
- House of Representatives of Egypt building in the new capital, Egypt

Website
- www.parliament.gov.eg

The House of Representatives is the lower house of Egypt's bicameral parliament, with the Egyptian Senate serving as the upper house. Together, the House and Senate have the authority under the Article 101 in Chapter Five of the Egyptian Constitution in enumerated matters to pass or defeat government legislation, approve the general policy of the state, the general plan for economic and social development, and the state’s general budget, and exercise oversight over the actions of the executive authority, all as outlined in the constitution.

Members of the House serve a fixed term of five years, with each seat up for election before the start of the next Congress. Special elections may also occur in the case of a vacancy. The House of Representatives consists of at least 450 members elected by direct, secret, universal suffrage, with voting supervised by members of the judiciary. In addition, the President of the Republic appoints a number of members not exceeding 5%.

The Republic is divided into four electoral districts for elections using the absolute closed-list proportional representation system and 143 electoral districts for elections using the single-member constituency system. The number of seats allocated to the single-member constituency system is 448, and 120 seats are allocated to party lists, in addition to a maximum of 28 seats appointed by the president of the Republic.

The Speaker of the House of Representatives is elected from among its members who have won seats in the parliamentary session. A general assembly of the House convenes to elect the speaker.

== History ==
Over a period representing the history of parliamentary life in Egypt, beginning in 1866, the country has had seven parliamentary systems, each with varying legislative and oversight powers. Over 135 years of parliamentary history have seen 32 parliamentary bodies, ranging in size from 75 to 458 members.

The House of Representatives was previously known as the People's Assembly, but was renamed after the passage of the 2012 Egyptian constitution.

== Formation of the House ==
The 2014 constitution that was passed in the 2014 constitutional referendum has put into place the following rules: the House that is elected following the ratification of the constitution must have at least 450 members. In addition, prospective members must be Egyptian, must be at least 25 years old and must hold an education certificate. Also, the president can appoint, at the most, five percent of the members in the chamber.

The House sits for a five-year term but can be dissolved earlier by the president. All seats are voted on in each election. The House of Representatives members are elected by absolute majority of legitimate votes cast.

The House may demand the resignation of the cabinet by adopting a motion of censure. For this reason, the Prime Minister of Egypt and his cabinet are necessarily from the dominant party or coalition in the House. When the president and house come from opposing parties (a situation which did arise historically, but not since the 1970s), this would lead to the situation known as cohabitation.

== Powers ==
The House of Representatives has various competences stated in Chapter Five of the Egyptian Constitution. According to article 86 the House of Representatives shall undertake:

- Legislation
- Review and approval of agreements and treaties
- Review and approval of the State plan and budget
- Discussion of the President of the Republic's statement and the government program
- Amendments to the Constitution
- Approval of declarations of war and emergency

In practice, the House had very little power prior to the 2011 Egyptian revolution. It was dominated by the National Democratic Party, and there was little substantive opposition to executive decisions.

== Organization ==
=== Speaker of the House ===
The House of Representatives Speaker (HR Speaker) presides over the House and is elected from the House membership, along with two deputies during the first session of the season. The Speaker's role in session is to keep the peace and order to the parliamentary session, take part in discussion provided that he gives up his presidency to one of his deputies and doesn't return to his presidency until the discussion is finished as well as ordering an emergency session for one of the House's committees. In case of vacancy in the President's office, the Speaker serves as acting president until the presidential elections are held (Which must be within 60 days). This has happened once, when president Anwar Sadat was assassinated in office, and then People's Assembly Speaker, Sufi Abu Taleb served as acting president. The last PU Speaker was Saad Al-Katatny, who briefly presided the Assembly for only 5 months from 23 January 2012 to the dissolution of parliament on 18 June 2012.

=== Speaker's Staff Office ===
The Staff is responsible for organization of the House's and its committees' agendas, the enforcement of the House's orders and is the link between the House and different agencies, ministries and other authorities. The staff consists of the HR speaker and his two deputies.

=== Committees ===
==== House's General Committee ====
This committee is formed in the beginning of the House's annual season, headed by the Speaker. Its membership includes the Deputy Speakers, representatives of the political parties' parliamentary committees, and five House members (of whom one is an independent, if there are more than ten independents). The Speaker is responsible for outlining the committee's agenda. The committee is responsible for discussing the general issues put forward by the president, the prime minister or the speaker.

==== Specialized Committees ====
These 18 committees are:

- Constitutional and Legislation Affairs Committee
- Budget and Planning Committee
- Economical Affairs Committee
- Foreign Relations Committee
- Arab Affairs Committee
- Defense, National Security and Mobilization Committee
- Proposals and Complaints Committee
- Religious, Social and Religious Endowments (Awkaf) Affairs Committee
- Health and Environmental Affairs Committee
- Human Rights Committee
- Transportation and Telecommunications Committee
- Housing, Public Utilities and Reconstruction Committee
- Local Government and Public Organizations Committee
- Youth Committee
- Manpower Committee
- Industry and Energy Committee
- Agriculture and Irrigation Committee
- Education and Scientific Research Committee
- Culture, Information and Tourism Committee

==== Ethics Committee ====
This committee is formed in the beginning of the House's annual season, headed by one of the HR speaker deputies. The membership includes the heads of the following committees: Constitutional Affairs and Legislation; Religious, Social and Awkaf Affairs; and Suggestions and Grievances; five members of the General Committee (of whom at least two are from the opposition parties); and five members chosen randomly from the House. This committee is responsible for looking into the violations committed by House members towards the Egyptian society's code of behavior towards religion, social standards, etc.

==== Ad hoc and combined committees ====
The ad hoc committees are formed by the suggestion of the Speaker or the request of the government to study, debate on a new bill or law, voting on the ratification of a new law or bill or a special issue of concern. The Speaker is responsible on choosing members for this committee. The Combined committees are formed by the request of the Speaker, the government, members of two or more of the specialized committees, with the aim of studying a particular issue of concern. These combined committees are headed by one of the Speaker's deputies. The orders of these committees are issued when a majority vote is achieved.

=== Parliamentary Chapter ===
The Egyptian House of Representatives is the Egyptian representative of the international parliamentary conventions. This chapter aims at developing of mutual relations with international parliaments. The General Assembly of this chapter consists of the entire membership of the House, and headed by the Speaker. The executive committee of this chapter of the Speaker staff office, three members chosen from the House membership of whom at least one is a member of the opposition parties. The House meets in its chapter form every January. Emergency sessions are held by the request of the executive committee to look into any of additionally outlined issues of concern.

== See also ==
- Speaker of the House of Representatives (Egypt)
- List of speakers of the House of Representatives (Egypt)
