= Egypt (electoral coalition) =

Egypt مصر
- Founded: 2015
- Ideology: Big tent Factions: Nasserism; Arab socialism Islamic socialism Arab nationalism Civic nationalism Liberal democracy Islamic democracy Secularism; Reformism; Liberalism; Pan-Arabism
- Political position: Centre to Left-wing
- House of Representatives: 13 / 568

Egypt, also known as the List of Egypt, was an electoral alliance established in Egypt between the Egyptian Front and the Independent Current Coalition which contested the 2015 Egyptian parliamentary election.

== History ==
The Egyptian Front had planned to ally with an electoral list headed by former Egyptian prime minister Kamal Ganzouri, called the National Alliance, which also included the Independent Current Coalition. However, Ganzouri withdrew from the race in February 2015, with some of the individuals involved in the list joining the newly created For the Love of Egypt alliance, which the Egyptian Front unsuccessfully attempted to join in September.

A joint list between the Egyptian Front and the Independent Current Coalition was announced in September. Some candidates from the Reawakening of Egypt list, as well as the Republican Alliance for Social Forces, withdrew from their own lists in September 2015 and joined the Egypt list.

The Arab Democratic Nasserist Party, Democratic Peace Party, Social Construction Party, Victory Party, the Voice of Egypt Party, Democratic Union Party, Egyptian Arab Socialist Party, Arab Party for Justice and Equality, Egyptian National Movement, My Homeland Egypt Party, the Democratic Generation Party and the El-Ghad Party were involved in determining party lists for the alliance.

The alliance was not initially allowed to run in the Upper Egypt constituency, despite a court ruling by the Supreme Administrative Court letting the alliance run there. The approval by the Higher Elections Committee was delayed, which coordinator Ahmed El-Fadaly believed disadvantaged the alliance.

== Electoral history ==
=== House of Representatives elections ===
Election	Seats	+/–	Result
2015			

== Affiliated parties and coalitions ==
- Democratic Generation Party
- My Homeland Egypt Party
- Egyptian National Movement
- El-Ghad Party
