= National Alliance (Egypt) =

Defunct Egyptian electoral alliance

- Founded: September 2014
- Dissolved: 4 February 2015
- Ideology: Big tent

The National Alliance was an electoral alliance in Egypt that was established by former Egyptian prime minister Kamal Ganzouri ahead of the 2015 Egyptian parliamentary election; Ganzouri withdrew from the race in February 2015. The list was superseded by two electoral lists: For the Love of Egypt and Egypt.

== History ==
Ganzouri began putting together the list in September 2014, after it became clear that Amr Moussa was unsuccessful in creating an alliance. The spokesman for the Egyptian Front, Mostafa Bakry, criticized the alliance that month for its inclusion of "Mubarak-era government ministers". The Egyptian Wafd Coalition declined an offer in October to join the alliance. The Arabic Popular Movement would have joined the alliance. Some of the individuals involved with the list included Mahmoud Badr, the founder of Tamarod, and Mounir Fakhry Abdel Nour. Ganzouri's alliance was unfavorably compared in November 2014 to the "unsuccessful" alliance created by Moussa. The Egyptian Front, by December, was one of the few alliances that was willing to partner with it, as Ganzouri was viewed by the New Wafd Party as a member of the old guard, and was opposed to "coordinating" with him, while the head of the Reform and Development Party, Mohamed Anwar Esmat Sadat, referred to Ganzouri as "the last thing peoples [sic] need." Egyptian president Abdel Fattah el-Sisi held a meeting with various parties in January 2015, where they strongly criticized Ganzouri's list.

Ganzouri withdrew from the race on 4 February 2015, with Badr and others joining the For the Love of Egypt alliance ahead of the election. According to Sameh Seif El-Yazal, a key figure in the For the Love of Egypt alliance, "Ganzouri's list ... ended in failure." Yehia Qadri, the chair of the Egyptian National Movement party, said that "members were surprised at Ganzouri's withdrawal", while the head of the Democratic Generation Party, Nagi El-Shehabi, believed that Ganzouri had "deceived" those who supported him. The Independent Current Coalition allied with the Egyptian Front and formed the Egypt electoral list.

== Formerly affiliated parties and coalitions ==
- Egyptian Front
  - Modern Egypt Party
  - My Homeland Egypt Party
  - Egyptian Patriotic Movement
  - Democratic Generation Party
- Independent Current Coalition
  - Democratic Peace Party
  - Egyptian Arab Socialist Party
  - Revolutionary Forces Bloc
- Free Egyptians Party
