= Independent Party Current =

Defunct Egyptian electoral alliance

- Founded: 2012
- Ideology: Big tent Factions: Arab nationalism Civic nationalism Arab socialism Pan-Arabism; Nasserism; Islamic democracy Liberal democracy

The Independent Party Current was an electoral alliance of Egyptian political parties that will compete in the 2013 Egyptian parliamentary election.

It consisted of two parties: the Arab Democratic Nasserist Party and the Democratic Peace Party.
