= 2023 Egyptian presidential election =

- 10–12 December 2023
- Registered: 67,032,438
- Turnout: 66.88% (▲25.75pp)
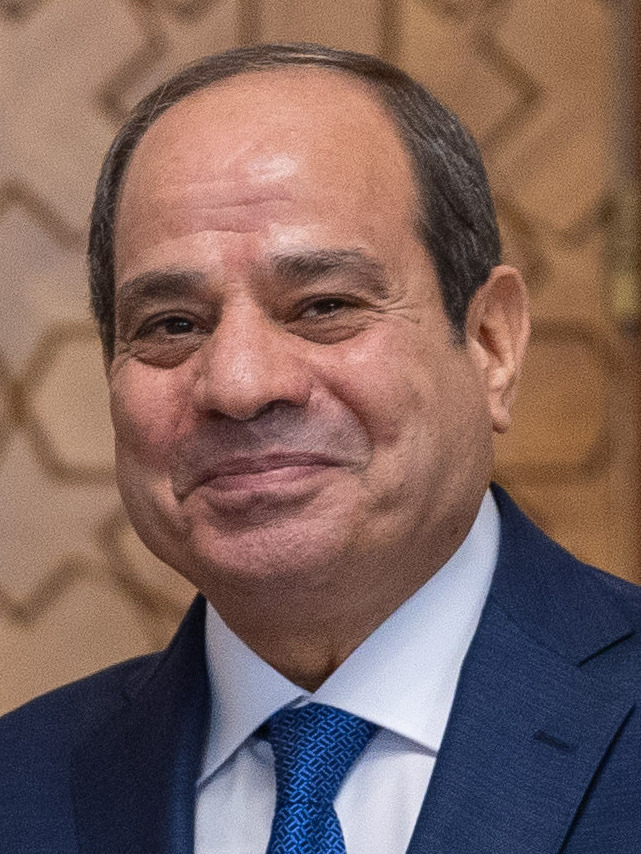
Candidate	Abdel Fattah el-Sisi	Hazem Omar
Party	Independent	Republican People's
Popular vote	39,702,451	1,986,352
Percentage	89.65%	4.49%
- Results by governorate El-Sisi: 80–85% 85–89% >90%
President before election
Abdel Fattah el-Sisi
Independent
Elected President
Abdel Fattah el-Sisi
Independent

Presidential elections were held in Egypt in December 2023, as announced by the National Elections Authority, after speculation that the elections might be held earlier than expected. Candidate registration was from 5–14 October 2023 and the election was held in Egypt from 10 to 12 December; expatriates voted from 1–3 December.

Incumbent president Abdel Fattah el-Sisi, who initially came to power in the aftermath of the 2013 Egyptian coup d'état, was eligible for re-election since term limits were adjusted from four to six years by a constitutional amendment in 2019, and he technically will not have served as president for more than the maximum of 12 years at the time of the election. His rule has been described as authoritarian. On 18 December he was reported to have won with 90% of the vote with a 67% turnout. El-Sisi was inaugurated for another term on 2 April 2024, with his victory attributed to him facing no serious challengers.

== Background ==
Incumbent president el-Sisi won the 2018 elections with over 97% of the vote, and faced only nominal opposition (a pro-government supporter, Moussa Mostafa Moussa) after several opposition figures were prevented from participating following the military arrest of Sami Anan, threats made to Ahmed Shafik with old corruption charges and an alleged sex tape, and the withdrawal of Khaled Ali and Mohamed Anwar El-Sadat due to the overwhelming obstacles presented, and violations committed, by the elections committee.

Since 2022 Egypt had been in the midst of an economic crisis, including record high inflation causing the Egyptian pound to lose nearly half its value from March 2022 to January 2023 and a shortage of foreign currency, the latter of which driven in part by the Russian invasion of Ukraine. Prior to the crisis, roughly 30% of the population was already living below the poverty line, with an additional 30% considered vulnerable to poverty. Furthermore, the country's external debt bill tripled in the ten years prior. Egypt had put several state-owned companies and stakes up for sale in a bid to raise money, and about half of the 2023/24 budget is allocated to debt servicing. The IMF has also requested that the Egyptian pound transition to a fully floating exchange rate in order for a round of loans to be released. Government spending on projects without a return on investment, such as the New Administrative Capital, were also blamed for contributing, in addition to a persistent trade deficit and continuing influence of the military in economic affairs. Moody's labeled Egypt as one of the top five economies most at risk of defaulting on foreign debt in 2023.

== Electoral system ==
The president of Egypt is elected using the two-round system for a term of six years, renewable once.

To participate, a candidate can either secure the endorsement of 20 MPs or "25,000 eligible voters across at least 15 governorates," with at least 1,000 endorsements from each governorate. Additionally, per Article 141 of the constitution:

- A candidate must be an Egyptian citizen born to Egyptian parents
- The candidate, their parents, and their spouse must not hold dual citizenship
- The candidate must not have been denied their civil and political rights due to a criminal conviction
- The candidate must have performed military service
- The candidate must be at least 40 years old

== Candidates ==
The following candidates submitted their nomination papers and were approved as candidates:

- Hazem Omar, chairman of the Republican People's Party (received over 70 thousand voter endorsements and 44 MP endorsements) (submitted candidacy on 13 October)
- Abdel Fattah el-Sisi, current president of Egypt (received over 1.1 million voter endorsements and 424 MP endorsements; submitted candidacy on 7 October)
- Abdel-Sanad Yamama, chairman of the New Wafd Party (received 22 MP endorsements) (submitted candidacy on 9 October)
- Farid Zahran, chairman of the Egyptian Social Democratic Party (received 28 MP endorsements) (submitted candidacy on 8 October)

List of presidential candidates in order they appear on the ballot paper
1	Abdel Fattah Saeed Hussein Khalil El-Sisi Abdel Fattah El-Sisi	President of Egypt (2014–present), Former Director of Egypt's Military Intelligence and served under Presidents Mohamed Morsi and Adly Mansour as Minister of Defence	Independent
2	Mohamed Farid Saad Zahran Farid Zahran	Leader of Egyptian Social Democratic Party, Journalist, and Director of Al Mahrousa Center for Publishing and Press Services.	Egyptian Social Democratic Party
3	Abdel Sanad Hassan Mohamed Yamama Abdel-Sanad Yamama	Leader of Egyptian Wafd Party, Lawyer, and Professor of International Law at Monufia University.	Egyptian Wafd Party
4	Hazem Mohamed Suliman Mohamed Omar Hazem Omar	Leader of the Republican People's Party, Chairman of the Foreign Relations Committee in the Senate (2020-2023), and Member of The Egyptian Senate (2020–Present).	Republican People's Party

=== Non-submitted ===
The following candidates had declared their intent to run, but did not submit their nomination papers:

Non-submitted candidates for the 2023 Egyptian presidential election
Name	Experience	Ref.
Fouad Badrawi	Former MP for the New Wafd Party	
Ahmed El-Fadaly	Chairman of the Democratic Peace Party	

=== Withdrawn ===
Withdrawn candidates for the 2023 Egyptian presidential election
Name	Experience	Endorsements	Campaign announced	Campaign suspended
Gameela Ismail	Head of the Constitution Party		20 September 2023	11 October 2023
Ahmed Tantawi	Former head of the Dignity Party; Former MP for the 25-30 Alliance	14,000 endorsements	21 April 2023	13 October 2023

== Controversies ==
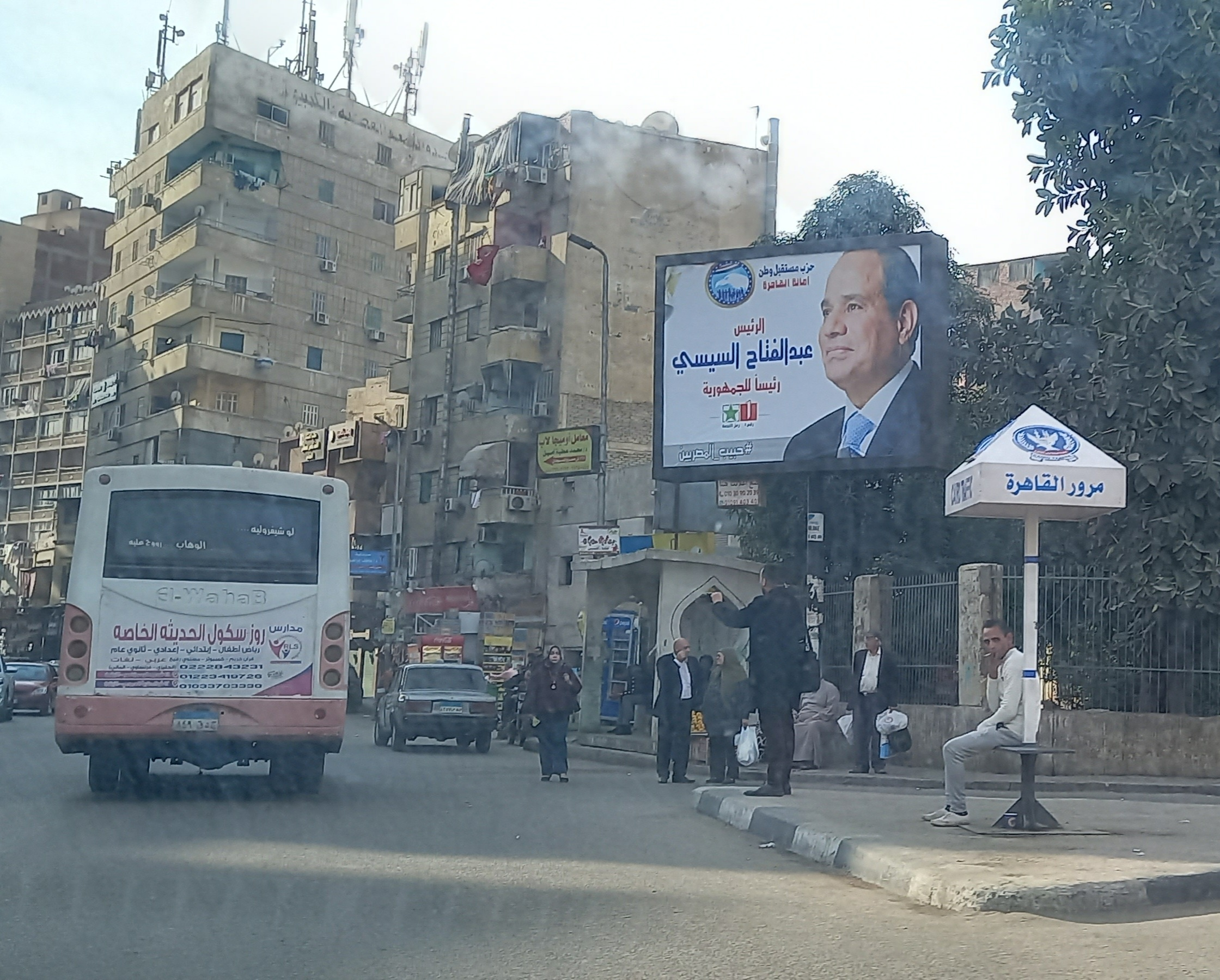
A Nation's Future Party Billboard endorsing el-Sisi in El Qobbah, Cairo. Billboard reads : "President Abdel Fattah el-Sisi for President of the Republic", with a hashtag saying: "The Beloved of the Egyptians".

The mobile phone of Ahmed Tantawi, considered the most prominent challenger to incumbent el-Sisi, was hacked using the Predator spyware. Citizen Lab and Google's Threat Analysis Group indicated that the attempts began as early as May 2023 and continued through August, using various methods, leading Apple to issue security updates on 21 September to patch the vulnerabilities exploited by the spyware. Tantawi suspended his campaign for 48 hours on 27 September following harassment and arrests of his supporters, even though the European Parliament warned the Egyptian government to not harass Tantawi or any other oppositional figure. Supporters of Tantawi also faced difficulties in submitting endorsements. Tantawi was unable to secure the required number of public endorsements and was thus not approved as a candidate for the election in October.

== Results ==
Candidate	Party	Votes	%
Abdel Fattah el-Sisi	Independent	39,702,451	89.65
Hazem Omar	Republican People's Party	1,986,352	4.49
Farid Zahran	Egyptian Social Democratic Party	1,776,952	4.01
Abdel-Sanad Yamama	Egyptian Wafd Party	822,606	1.86
Total		44,288,361	100.00
Valid votes		44,288,361	98.91
Invalid/blank votes		489,307	1.09
Total votes		44,777,668	100.00
Registered voters/turnout		67,032,438	66.80
Source: NEA, Arab News, Paudal

== Aftermath ==
According to official results shared by the National Elections Authority, turnout was 66.8%, eclipsing the turnout from the 2012 presidential election that followed the 2011 Egyptian revolution. Egyptian media portrayed the election as a "great victory for the will of the people," who were reportedly motivated to vote because of the country's "state of stability and security." The opposition described the election as a "farce", marred by corrupt practices and intimidation of el-Sisi's opponents, similar to the 2018 presidential election. Multiple voters interviewed at the entrance to several polling stations admitted that they had been paid between 200 and 300 Egyptian pounds (US$6.46 to $9.69) by supporters of el-Sisi to come and vote. There were also reports that security forces forcibly escorted people waiting at bus stops or train stations to polling stations for voting, and that civil servants were required to prove that they had voted by showing their finger marked with election ink.

The elections were described by multiple international organizations and media outlets as not competitive.
