= National Front Alliance (Egypt) =

National Front Alliance تحالف الجبهة الوطنية
- Founded: 2015
- Ideology: Nasserism; Factions: Arab nationalism Arab socialism Pan-Arabism; Democratic socialism Left-wing nationalism Left-wing populism Social liberalism
- Political position: Centre to left-wing

The National Front Alliance was an alliance of political parties that contested the 2015 Egyptian parliamentary election in the Dakahlia Governorate.

== History ==
The parties involved planned to run as part of the Reawakening of Egypt alliance, which was created by Abdelgelil Mostafa. However, the Reawakening of Egypt withdrew from the election.

== Policies ==
The alliance supported progressive taxation, a minimum wage and maximum wage and emphasized the importance of an agricultural economy.

== Affiliated parties ==
- Egyptian Democratic
- Nasserist Party
- Future of Egypt Party
- Dignity Party
- Tagammu
- Conference Party
