= Tantawi (disambiguation) =

Muhammad Sayyid Tantawi (1928–2010) was an Egyptian Islamic scholar who served as the 16th grand mufti of Egypt from 1986 to 1996 and the 43rd grand imam of al-Azhar from 1996 to 2010.

Tantawi is an Arabic surname denoting a person from Tanta and may also refer to:

- Ahmed Tantawi (born 1979), Egyptian journalist who was a member of the 2015–2020 Egyptian House of Representatives and of the 25-30 Alliance
- Hussein Tantawi (1935–2021), Egyptian field marshal and politician who served as the commander-in-chief of the Egyptian Armed Forces and from 2011 to 2012
