= National Front coalition =

National Front coalition may refer to:

- National Front of the German Democratic Republic, a coalition of parties 1950–1990
- National Front Alliance (Egypt), 2015
