= Republican People's Party (Egypt) =

Political party in Egypt

Republican People's Party حزب الشعب الجمهورى
- Abbreviation: RPP
- President: Hazem Omar
- Founded: 12 September 2012
- Headquarters: Cairo
- Ideology: Centrism
- Political position: Centre
- National affiliation: Egyptian Front; National Unified List for Egypt (since 2020)
- Colors: Gold
- House of Representatives: 28 / 596
- Senate: 10 / 300

Website
- rpp-eg.org

The Republican People's Party (Arabic: حزب الشعب الجمهورى, romanized: Ḥizb aš-Ša‘b al-Ǧumhūrī) is an Egyptian political party made up of former government ministers. It is currently headed by former chairman of the Senate foreign relations committee, Hazem Omar.

== History ==
The party supported Amr Moussa in the 2012 Egyptian presidential election. Hazem Omar denied that the party was composed of remnants (feloul) of the National Democratic Party, which was in power during the Mubarak era.

The party was one of the founding members of the Egyptian Front, which was established in August 2014.

The party won 13 seats in the 2015 Egyptian parliamentary election and joined the Egypt's Support coalition in parliament that December.

The party joined the National Unified List for Egypt in 2020 and was the second largest party in Egypt following the 2020 elections, with the party having 50 representatives in the Egyptian House of Representatives and 10 senators in the Egyptian Senate. Although the party is supportive of President Abdel Fattah el-Sisi, they nominated party leader Hazem Omar to compete against Sisi in the 2023 Egyptian presidential election. Omar came in second place with 4.5% of the vote.

Businessman Ahmed Abu Hashima joined the party in 2020 and became its vice president.

The party joined the National Unified List for Egypt and won 25 elected seats in the 2025 Egyptian parliamentary election.

== Electoral history ==
=== House of Representatives elections ===
Election	Votes	%	Seats	+/–
2015	198,822	0.7%	13 / 596	▲13
2020		8.3%	50 / 596	▲37
2025			28 / 596	▼22

=== Senate elections ===
Election	Votes	%	Seats	+/–
2020			5 / 300	▲5
2025			10 / 300	▲5

=== Presidential elections ===
Election	Candidate	Vote	%
2023	Hazem Omar	1,986,352	4.49%
