= We Are the People Party =

We Are The People Party إحنا الشعب
- Founder: Mahmoud Nafady
- National affiliation: Call of Egypt
- House of Representatives: 0 / 568

The We Are the People Party, also translated as the We are Egypt Party, is a political party that is made up of 270 former members of parliament. The party was formed by the Coalition of the People's Representatives, which is composed of former members of the National Democratic Party, which was formerly the ruling party of Egypt. The party was formerly known as the Egyptian Street Party. The party seeks to obtain a majority of the seats in the 2015 parliamentary election. The party prohibits Islamists and people who were involved in corruption from being involved in the party.

The constitution that was passed in 2012 has a ban on former members of the NDP from taking part in any "political activities"; former members of the NDP are identified as “those who had been on 25 January 2011 members in the general secretariat of the NDP or its policies committee or its political executive office or former members in the parliament (the two chambers) in the two parliamentary seasons prior to the revolution." The 2013 draft of the constitution, which in final form passed in a referendum, had the ban on NDP members removed, though the Cairo Court for Urgent Matters banned former NDP members from taking part in elections on 6 May 2014. However, a member of a committee that is revising parliamentary laws (named Mahmoud Fawzy) has stated that the law only bans those who are convicted of tax evasion and political corruption. The ruling barring former NDP members from taking part in elections was overturned by the Cairo Court for Urgent Matters on 14 July 2014.
