= New Independent Party =

New Independent Party الحزب المستقل الجديد
- Leader: Hesham Al Anani
- National affiliation: Call of Egypt
- House of Representatives: 0 / 568

The New Independent Party is an Egyptian political party that is made up of former members of the National Democratic Party.

The party ran in the 2011–2012 Egyptian parliamentary election.

It was formerly part of the Social Justice Coalition, though it later joined the Call of Egypt alliance.
