= Al-Ummah =

Egyptian newspaper

Al-Ummah (Arabic: الأمة is an Egyptian newspaper issued by the Umma Party with the approval of the Supreme Press Council. It was founded by Ahmed El-Sabahi, the Party's founder, at the same time as the Party itself in 1983 and was published weekly for 26 years, until a 2009-17 lacuna due to the 2008 financial crisis. In 2017, it returned with journalist Saeed Zeinhom as Editor and a Board of Director headed by Councilor Maher Muhanna, the Party's Secretary-General. In 2021, the editorial body was again restructured, with columnist Iman Mansour appointed editor-in-chief.
