= National Movement Party =

National Movement Party may refer to one of the following parties:

- Nationalist Movement Party in Turkey
- Egyptian National Movement
