= Republican Alliance for Social Forces =

Republican Alliance of Social Forces التحالف الجمهوري للقوى الاجتماعية
- Leader: Hossam Khairallah
- House of Representatives: 0 / 568

The Republican Alliance of Social Forces was an electoral alliance in Egypt that competed in the 2015 Egyptian parliamentary election. Some candidates from this list as well as the Reawakening of Egypt list withdrew from their own lists and joined the Egypt list.

Major figures in the alliance included Tahany al-Gebaly, a former vice president on the Supreme Constitutional Court, Hossam Khairallah, who was an officer in the General Intelligence Service, and Hassan Shaaban, who was the vice president of the New Wafd Party. The alliance ran on the list system in Cairo.
