= People's Representatives Coalition =

Defunct Egyptian electoral alliance

Coalition of the People’s Representatives
- Founded: October 2012

The Coalition of the People's Representatives, or the Parliamentarians is a former electoral alliance in Egypt; members of the alliance have created the We Are the People Party in 2014.

== History ==
The coalition was formed by former members of the National Democratic Party.

Gamal Abdel Maqsoud, who ran as an independent and won during the 2000 parliamentary election and the 2005 parliamentary election, has stated that the coalition had 190 candidates who were willing to run in the next parliamentary election. The coalition intended to run with political parties that are non-religious. The coalition was considering whether to join with the Conference Party, the Egyptian Popular Current, the Egyptian Nation Alliance, or the Egyptian Patriotic Movement as part of an electoral coalition. A document signed by prominent members of the Coalition of the People's Representatives emphasizes that no one should be excluded from the Egyptian political scene. The constitution that was passed in December 2012 has a ban on former members of the NDP from taking part in any "political activities"; former members of the NDP are identified as “those who had been on 25 January 2011 members in the general secretariat of the NDP or its policies committee or its political executive office or former members in the parliament (the two chambers) in the two parliamentary seasons prior to the revolution." A member of the National Salvation Front, Essam Shiha, has stated that the article only applies to a few hundred members, with roughly one thousand members banned out of the 2 million who were part of local councils or part of local NDP offices. A draft of the 2014 constitution removed the ban on members of the NDP.
