= Sameh Ashour =

Egyptian lawyer

Member of the Senate
- In office October 2020 – 2025

Personal details
- Born: Sameh Mohamed Ashour
- Occupation: Lawyer, member of the Egyptian Senate

Sameh Mohamed Ashour (born in Sohag) is an Egyptian lawyer and politician.

== Biography ==
Ashour completed his LLB in 1975. He was the Vice President of Supreme Consultancy Council, Egypt Bar association, head of lawyers syndicate, vice president of International Bar association and African Bar Association and president of the Arab Lawyers Association.

Ashour served as the vice president of the Arab Democratic Nasserist Party in 2010 and was elected the head of the party in April 2011 after the previous chairman, Diaa al-Din Dawoud, died.

He was one of 100 members appointed in June 2012 to the Egyptian Constituent Assembly of 2012.

Later that year, he served as the spokesman for the National Salvation Front, a coalition of parties which opposed Egyptian president Mohamed Morsi's constitutional declaration.

He ran in the 2015 Egyptian parliamentary election in the Mokattam constituency.

Ashour served as the head of the Lawyers Syndicate three times. He ran in December 2022, but was disqualified by the Supreme Administrative Court.

Ashour was appointed to the Senate in 2020. He resigned to run for the presidency of the Lawyers Syndicate, which he lost.
