= Egyptian Wafd Alliance =

Defunct Egyptian electoral alliance

- Founded: 4 August 2014
- Ideology: Big tent Factions: Liberalism; National liberalism Economic liberalism Liberal conservatism Conservative liberalism Conservatism; Arab nationalism Secularism; Islamism
- Political position: Centre to centre-right

The Egyptian Wafd Alliance, initially called the National Front Coalition, was an alliance of political parties that would have run in the 2015 Egyptian parliamentary election.

== History ==
The alliance was initially founded as the National Front Coalition in December 2013. The alliance was formally launched the following August as the Egyptian Wafd Alliance, after Amr Moussa was unsuccessful in launching a new alliance.

The Egyptian Social Democratic Party left the alliance and will run independently. The Tagammu Party left the Wafd Alliance and will run for individual seats. The Justice Party announced on 15 February 2015 that it will not participate in the election. The New Wafd Party, Conservative Party and Reform and Development Party joined the For the Love of Egypt alliance.

== Formerly affiliated parties ==
- New Wafd Party
- Reform and Development Party
- Conservative Party
- Consciousness Party
- Arab Alliance Party
- Arab Party for Justice and Equality
- Reform and Renaissance Party
- National Partnership Current
- Justice Party
