= Construction (Egyptian coalition) =

Construction البناء
- Founded: 14 February 2015
- House of Representatives: 0 / 567

Construction was a movement created by Amr Al-Shobaki that will run in the 2015 Egyptian parliamentary election. Al-Shobaki was previously involved in the Egyptian Wafd Alliance. The Reform and Renaissance Party joined the movement on 19 February 2015.
