= Call of Egypt =

Call of Egypt نداء مصر
- Spokesperson: Mahmoud Nafady; Tarek Zeidan
- Founded: December 2014
- Ideology: Big tent Factions: Arab nationalism Militarism
- Political position: Centre to centre-right
- House of Representatives: 18 / 568

The Call of Egypt (Arabic: نداء مصر, romanized: Nidaa Misr) was an electoral alliance in Egypt that competed in the 2015 Egyptian parliamentary election. The coalition has accused the Nour Party of cooperating with NDP-era tycoon Ahmed Ezz in the run up to the 2015 Egyptian parliamentary election, though the Nour Party has denied the claim. The Revolutionary Guards Party, after initially joining the alliance in February 2015, decided to run for the election on its own. The coalition was seen as being supportive of current president Abdel Fattah el-Sisi.

== Affiliated parties ==
- Human Rights and Citizenship Party
- We Are the People Party
- Egyptian Revolution Party
- New Independent Party
- Arab Party for Justice and Equality
- Homeland Defenders Party
