= Mohamed Abu Hamed =

Egyptian politician

Mohamed Abu Hamed محمد أبو حامد
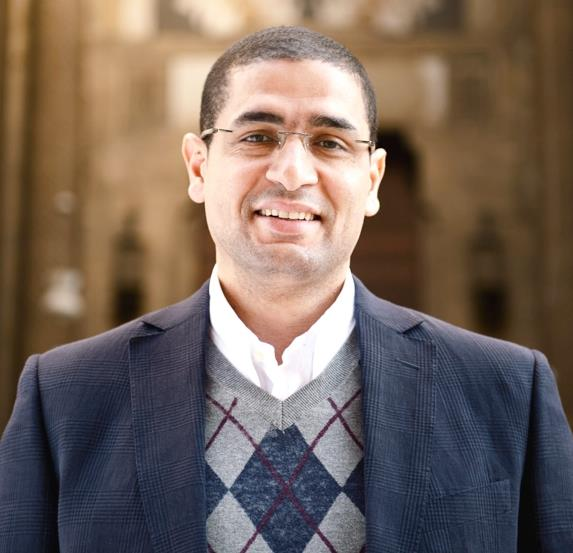

Member of the People's Assembly of Egypt
- Incumbent
- Assumed office 23 January 2012
- Constituency: Cairo—Qasr el-Nil

Personal details
- Born: Mohamed Abu Hamed Shaheen; March 14, 1973 (age 53) Cairo, Egypt
- Party: Free Egyptians Party (2011-2012); Egyptian Patriotic Movement (2012); Life of the Egyptians Party (2012-?); Free Egyptians Party (2015-present)
- Profession: Accountant
- Known for: Political Activist

Mohamed Abu Hamed Shaheen (Arabic: محمد ابو حامد شاهين, IPA: [mæˈħæmmæd æbuˈħæːmed ʃæˈhiːn]) (born March 14, 1973) is an Egyptian politician. He is the former vice chairman of the Free Egyptians Party, and was an elected member of the post-revolutionary People's Assembly of Egypt, representing Kasr El Nil district in Cairo.

== Early life and career ==
Mohamed Abu Hamed Shaheen graduated from the Accounting Department, Faculty of Commerce, Cairo University in 1995. Following 11 September events in the US, Abu Hamed registered a Ph.D. thesis in "Philosophy of Political Sciences and the Relation between Religion and Politics". The aim was to monitor the history of how these religions affected the politics, whether this impact is negative or positive and how to prevent the overlapping of religion and politics. Shaheen works in designing and evaluating financial information and international control systems and auditing. He is registered with the Ministry of Finance as a Chartered Accountant. Abu Hamed owns an Egyptian joint-stock company named 'Life Concept' this is specialized in financial consultancies, strategic planning and financial crisis management.

== Political action ==
Abu Hamed has participated in 25 January Revolution since the first day until the former president stepped down. He was a member of the Committee of 'Wise Men' and one of 22 persons who called for forming the Free Egyptians Party. Abu Hamed is a member of the High Commission of the Free Egyptians Party. He participated in setting forth the party's program relating to the political structure and different freedoms and human rights. He is the coordinator of eight Human Rights and Freedoms committees. He is the spokesperson for the Sisi Supporters Front, a merger of 28 groups that have called on Egyptian defense minister Abdel Fattah el-Sisi to run for president in the 2014 Egyptian presidential election.

He is the former head of the Free Egyptians Party's parliamentary bloc. He resigned from the party in early March 2012, though he rejoined the party in February 2015.
