= Independent National Reawakening Bloc =

Independent National Reawakening Bloc çكتلة الصحوة الوطنية المستقلة
- Founded: 2014
- House of Representatives: 0 / 568

The Independent National Reawakening Bloc (Arabic: çكتلة الصحوة الوطنية المستقلة, romanized: al-Sahwa al-Wataneya) was an electoral list in Egypt that competed in the 2015 Egyptian parliamentary election in the Upper Egypt district.
