= Centrist Coalition =

Defunct Egyptian electoral alliance

- Founded: 2013
- Ideology: Big tent Factions: Liberalism; Secularism; Moderate Islam; Moderate Islamism
- Political position: Centre
- Religion: Islam

The Centrist Coalition was a centrist electoral alliance in Egypt which was formed in 2013 ahead of anticipated parliamentary polls.

== History ==
The alliance was preceded by the Moderate Current Coalition, which was formed in 2012 and included the Civilization Party, the Wasat Party, the Egyptian Current Party and the Strong Egypt Party, in addition to the Justice Party, the April 6 Youth Movement and the Masrina movement.

The Centrist Coalition originally included the El-Sarh El-Masry Party, the Ghad El-Thawra Party, the Virtue Party, the Authenticity Party, the Strong Egypt Party, the Reform and Renaissance Party, and the Egyptian Current Party.

The Wasat Party became part of the Anti-Coup Alliance, though it left the alliance on 28 August 2014.
