= Mostafa Bakry =

Egyptian politician

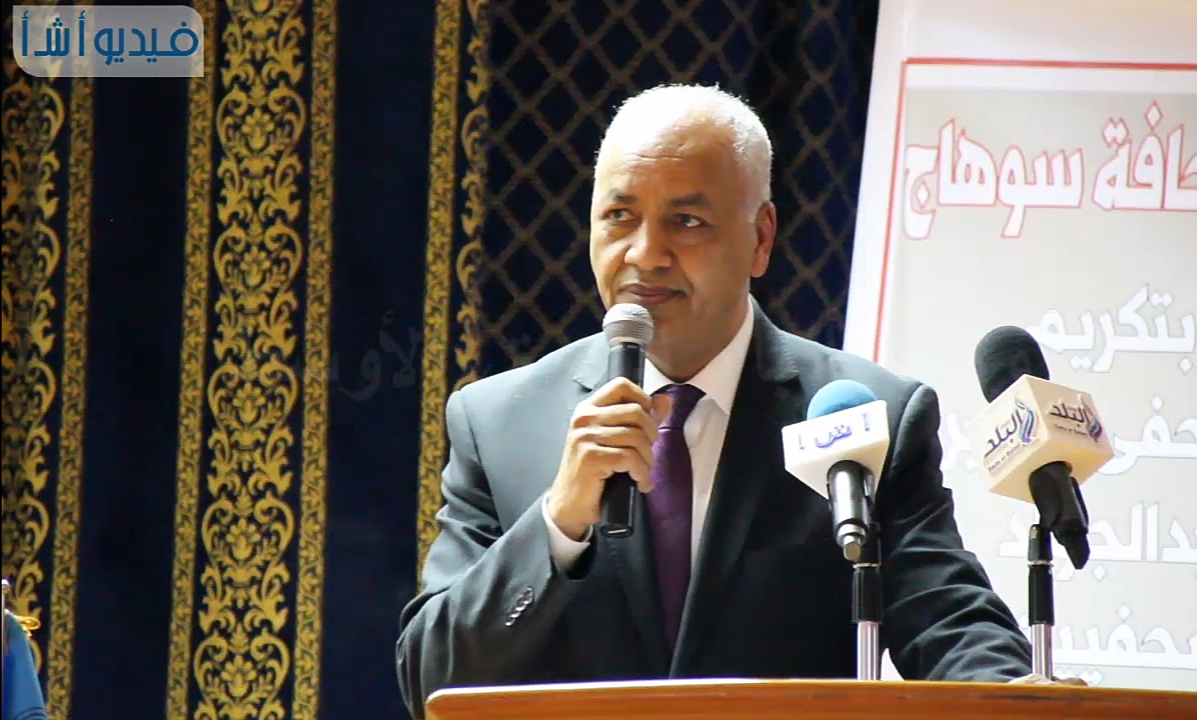
- Born: July 14, 1956 (age 69); Sohag Governorate, Egypt
- Occupations: Journalist, Politician
- Known for: Member of the Egyptian Parliament, Editor-in-chief of Al-Osboa

Mostafa Bakry (born 16 May 1956) is an Egyptian journalist, TV presenter, author, politician and member of the Egyptian House of Representatives.

== Career ==
In 1996 he was serving as the editor-in-chief of Al Ahrar, organ of the Liberal Party, but fired due to his extensive support for Nasserist views. He also served as the editor-in-chief of the El-Osboa newspaper.

He was elected as an independent to the Egyptian House of Representatives following the 2011–12 Egyptian parliamentary election.

Bakry is the vice president of My Homeland Egypt Party and served as a spokesperson for the Egyptian Front, a coalition of Egyptian political parties.

He was a candidate on the National Unified List for Egypt in the 2025 Egyptian parliamentary election.
