= Egypt's Support coalition =

Egypt’s Support coalition
- Founded: 2015

Egypt's Support Coalition, also known as the Alliance to Support Egypt, and originally called the Pro-Egyptian State Coalition, the State Supporting coalition or the Alliance to Support the State, was a parliamentary group within the Egyptian House of Representatives.

== History ==
The For the Love of Egypt alliance announced in October 2015 that it would form a coalition after run off elections were completed.

The bloc was formed in December 2015, following the 2015 Egyptian parliamentary election, by Sameh Seif El-Yazal, who was the figure behind the formation of the For the Love of Egypt list.

The Free Egyptians Party, Nation's Future Party and New Wafd Party separately announced in late December that they would not join it, with Mahmoud Badran, the leader of the Nation's Future Party, commenting that the bloc was "seeking to divide the parliament like a cake." Shehab Waguih, the Free Egyptians Party spokesman, differentiated between For the Love of Egypt, which the party had joined, and the planned parliamentary bloc. Despite the criticism, the Nation's Future Party did join it several days later. One member of the Free Egyptians Party was suspended the same month for joining the coalition.

El-Yazal was succeeded by Saad El-Gamal, who was a member of the National Democratic Party and is also a party secretary in Alexandria for the Union Party.

The coalition won many of the committee chairs that were contested in April 2016.

It was the first coalition in parliament to be recognized, gaining official recognition in May, with over 315 members, including 121 party members and 216 independents.

Mohamed Al Sewedy won the party presidency in September 2017, marking the second time he had won.

The coalition retained many of the same posts in October 2018, with numerous members winning "uncontested".
