= Diaa al-Din Dawoud =

Egyptian politician and activist

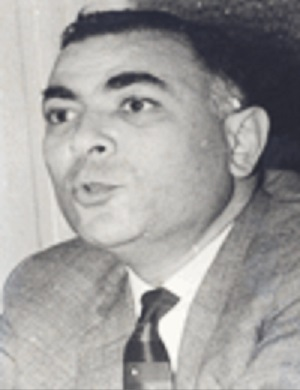
- Portrait of Dawoud, 1968

Social Affairs Minister
- In office 1968–1971
- Prime Minister: Gamal Abdel Nasser (1968-1970); Mahmoud Fawzi (1970-1971)

Secretary-General of Arab Democratic Nasserist Party
- In office 19 April 1992 – 2009
- Preceded by: Post Established
- Succeeded by: Ahmed Hassan

Personal details
- Born: 26 March 1926 al-Roda, Damietta Governorate, Kingdom of Egypt
- Died: 6 April 2011 (aged 85) Cairo, Egypt
- Party: Arab Socialist Union (1964-1971); Arab Democratic Nasserist Party (1987-death)

Diaa al-Din Dawoud (name also spelled Diya el-Din Dawud or Diaaeddin Dawoud; 26 March 1926 – 6 April 2011) was an Egyptian politician and activist. He is the founder of the Arab Democratic Nasserist Party, serving as its secretary-general between 1992 and November 2010.

== Early life and law career ==
Dawoud was born and raised in the rural Nile Delta village of al-Roda in the Damietta region. At the time, many of al-Roda's inhabitants were impoverished, although Dawoud's family lived in relatively better conditions, owning about 100 feddans of land. Most of the village's lands were owned by Mohammed Abdel Halim Halim, a Turkey-based relative of then-King Farouk. Dawoud grew up resenting what he saw as the exploitation of al-Roda's inhabitants by the royal aristocracy and the poor conditions of his village.

In an interview with Al Ahram Weekly, Dawoud claimed he was the only person from al-Roda who attended university in the 1940s. He spent his first year, 1946, studying at the Alexandria University's Faculty of Law, before being admitted to King Fuad University in Cairo in 1947. He graduated with a law degree in 1950. He briefly joined the Muslim Brotherhood during his time at King Fuad University, but left shortly after due to his disillusionment with what he called "absolutist religious thinking." During his university years, Dawoud took an interest in socialism and political activism, joining the National Party headed by Abd al-Rahman al-Rafai in 1946. That year, students from Alexandria University's law school staged a protest against the British military presence in Alexandria prompting the Egyptian security forces to quell the demonstration, killing two of Dawoud's classmates. The British military barracks was then attacked by students the following day, resulting in the closure the university until October.

Dawoud began his law practice working for a firm in Faraskur, a city near his hometown. He continued his law practice in the Damietta area after the Egyptian Revolution of 1952, when the Free Officers Movement overthrew the monarchy of King Farouk. Dawoud welcomed the revolution and left the National Party, viewing the party system itself as "politically bankrupt and lack[ing] solutions to help the country escape the continued political and socio-economic crisis." When the Free Officers, who governed through the Revolutionary Command Council, established a single-party system in 1953 with the Liberation Rally being the only legal political movement of the state, Dawoud joined it. The National Union replaced the Liberation Rally in 1956.

== Political career ==
=== Minister and party cadre ===
In 1962, the Arab Socialist Union (ASU) was inaugurated as the new ruling party. Two years later, Dawoud ended his law career, became a local party official in the Damietta Governorate's ASU chapter and a member of its local council. Also in 1964, he entered his candidacy in the parliamentary elections, winning the Faraskur seat. Afterward, President Gamal Abdel Nasser appointed him as the Executive Bureau Secretary of the ASU in Damietta.

Dawoud was elected to the eight-member Supreme Executive Committee of the ASU in party elections in 1968, receiving 104 votes, falling behind Anwar Sadat, Mahmoud Fawzi, Hussein el-Shafei and Ali Sabri. He was affiliated with Sabri's left-leaning faction, and his election to the ASU was seen by observers as strengthening the position of Sabri, who gained the highest votes within the party. Dawoud was consequently made Social Affairs Minister in Prime Minister Nasser's cabinet; Nasser had taken the additional role of Prime Minister in 1967.

=== Conflict with Sadat ===
In a private meeting with Vice President and Speaker of Parliament Sadat, Al-Ahram editor-in-chief, Mohamed Hassanein Heikal, and ASU Press Secretary Khaled Mohieddin during the 1968 ASU Congress, Dawoud entered into an argument with Sadat, accusing him of "corrupting Egypt's parliamentary life". Heikal informed Nasser of Dawoud's concerns, which Nasser shared. Nasser appointed Labib Shukair as speaker later that year.

Following Nasser's death in September 1970, Sadat succeeded him as president. Sadat faced opposition from Dawoud and the members of Sabri's camp, who favored a form of collective leadership to fill the political vacuum left by Nasser. Tensions between the two sides were initially eased when Sadat announced his preference for collective leadership during his inaugural speech. Conflict between the pro and anti-Sadat factions resumed in April 1971, when members of the Supreme Executive Committee voted 5 to 3 against Sadat's agreement to form a federation with Libya and Syria, with Dawoud being one of the opposing votes. During that meeting Dawoud also called on Sadat to resign from the presidency. In disapproval of Sadat's policies, which they viewed as running counter to the goals of the 1952 Egyptian Revolution and Nasser's legacy, members of the pro-Sabri faction, including Dawoud, announced their resignation on 13 May.

Later that month, Sadat announced that members of the pro-Sabri faction were orchestrating a coup to topple him and ordered the arrests of Sabri and his allies, including Dawoud. In September, Dawoud was brought to trial along with 91 other ASU officials. Dawud was sentenced to 10 years imprisonment, while Sabri was given a death sentence, which was commuted by Sadat to a life sentence. The arrest and imprisonment of prominent ASU members was seen as a purge by Sadat, not necessarily of Nasserists, but of powerful members of the party leadership opposed to his rule. The purge was part of a broader monopolization of power by Sadat known as the "Corrective Movement".

=== The Nasserist Party and the Mubarak era ===
In 1987, during a period of limited political détente offered by President Hosni Mubarak (r. 1981-2011), Nasserist opponents of Sadat from the ASU (it was dissolved in 1978), including Dawoud who had been released from prison by that time, founded the Arab Democratic Nasserist Party. Dawoud was chosen as the party's chief representative. The party modeled itself as the upholder of Nasser's legacy, calling for state-led economic growth, rejection of Zionism and American imperialism and closer inter-Arab ties.

When Dawoud's reentry into politics was opposed by Mubarak's administration due to his 1971 conviction, Dawoud launched an appeal to the Supreme Constitutional Court (SCC) challenging that particular provision law. Dawoud succeeded in arguing that the provision law ran counter to articles 66 and 187 of the constitution because it was a form of retroactive punishment and barred a person's political rights. The SCC nullified the provision. However, when the ADNP sought to be legalized as a party, their application was rejected by the Committee for Parties on account of the ADNP's rejection of the Camp David Peace Treaty with Israel. This prompted Dawoud to appeal to the Court of Parties. The case remained in deadlock until 1988 when the SCC ruled the ADNP to be legal, despite government objections. Dawud remained as secretary-general, but the party was not officially proclaimed until 1992. Dawoud's legal victories opened the door for numerous other opposition activists to press for further rights in the courts.

In the 1995 and 2000 People's Assembly elections, the ADNP was the only party that was legalized after 1990 (there were a total of ten) to win any seats. In 1995 the party won two seats and in 2000, three seats. However, the party failed to win any seats in the 2005 and 2010 elections amid internal divisions, low sources of funding and government financial pressure and harassment. Between 2007 and 2008, tensions developed between Dawoud and party cadre Sameh Ashour, when the latter tried to oust Dawoud from his role as secretary-general. Dawoud stepped down from the party leadership in November 2010, citing health reasons. Although he delegated Ashour to serve as the party's leader, Dawoud was succeeded by Ahmed Hassan, creating further rifts within the ADNP. Dawoud died in April, with Hassan being ejected from the party at the same time that Ashour was elected president of the party.

== Bibliography ==
- Ansari, Hamied (1986), Egypt: The Stalled Society, SUNY Press, ISBN 0-88706-183-4
- Bernard-Maugiron, Nathalie (2008), Judges and Political Reform in Egypt, American Univ in Cairo Press, ISBN 978-977-416-201-5
- Farid, Abdel Magid (1996), Nasser: The Final Years, Garnet & Ithaca Press, ISBN 0-86372-211-3
- Legum, Colin (1972), Africa Contemporary Record: Annual Survey and Documents, vol. 4, Africana Publishing Company
- Moustafa, Tamir (2007), The Struggle for Constitutional Power, Cambridge University Press, ISBN 978-0-521-87604-9
- Nyrop, Richard F. (1976), Area Handbook for Egypt, vol. 43, U.S. Government Printing Office
- Podeh, Elie (2004), Rethinking Nasserism: Revolution and Historical Memory in Modern Egypt, University Press of Florida, ISBN 0-8130-2704-7
