= Mostafa Alnagar =

Egyptian politician, dentist, and activist

Mostafa Al-Naggar
- مصطفى النجار
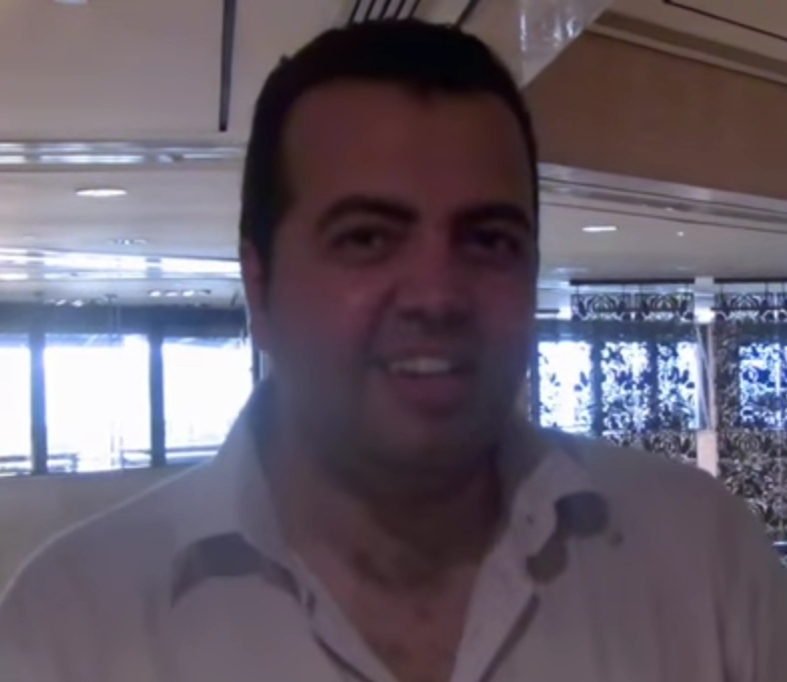
- Born: 5 May 1980 (age 46); Cairo, Egypt
- Disappeared: 28 September 2018 (aged 38); Aswan, Egypt
- Status: Missing person (alleged forced disappearance)
- Education: Cairo University; Al-Azhar University (Dentistry); American University in Cairo (Mass Communication)
- Occupations: activist, dentist, politician
- Known for: Co-founder of Al-Adl Party; Member of People's Assembly (2012); Role in 2011 Egyptian revolution
- Political party: Al-Adl Party (2011–2012)
- Spouse: Shymaa Afifi
- Children: 3

Mostafa Alnagar / Mostafa Alnajjarمصطفي النجار; (born 5 May 1980 in Cairo, Egypt) is an Egyptian politician, writer, and dentist who rose to prominence as a key figure in the 2011 Egyptian revolution. A co-founder of the Al-Adl Party, he served as a member of the People's Assembly of Egypt (parliament) in 2012, representing the Nasr City district.

Al-Naggar was a leading theoretician and operator of the "Third Way" current in Egyptian politics, advocating for a civil state that bridges the divide between military rule and Islamism. In December 2017, he was sentenced in absentia to three years in prison on charges of "insulting the judiciary," a verdict stemming from a 2012 parliamentary speech in which he criticized the acquittal of security forces accused of killing protesters. He has been missing since 28 September 2018. While human rights organizations, including Amnesty International, classify his case as an enforced disappearance, the Egyptian government maintains that he is a fugitive evading his sentence.

== Early life and education ==
Mostafa Al-Naggar was born on 5 May 1980 in Cairo to a religiously conservative middle-class family. His educational background reflects a synthesis of Egypt's dual educational systems: the religious and the secular. He first attended Al-Azhar University, the center of Sunni Islamic learning, where he graduated with a bachelor's degree in Dentistry.

Seeking to expand his intellectual framework beyond the medical and religious sciences, he subsequently obtained a degree in Mass Communication from the American University in Cairo (AUC), a liberal arts institution. During his time at AUC, he worked as a researcher on a project documenting social movements for the Political Science department. This academic engagement provided him with a theoretical grounding in civil resistance and mobilization strategies, which influenced his later political activism.

== Political career ==
=== Early activism (2005–2010) ===
Al-Naggar began his public life in the "Egyptian Blogosphere," a digital space that served as a primary hub for dissent under the Hosni Mubarak presidency. In 2005, he founded the blog Horreya (Freedom), using it to document human rights violations, with a specific focus on police brutality and torture. His early writings articulated a vision for a "Third Way" (Tayyar al-Wasat), rejecting the binary choice between the authoritarian stability of the regime and the theocratic vision of the].

=== 2011 Revolution ===
In 2010, Al-Naggar became the coordinator for Mohamed ElBaradei's presidential campaign and a founding member of the National Association for Change (NAC). His background allowed him to act as a bridge between the youth-led digital activists—such as the]—and traditional opposition figures.

During the 2011 Egyptian revolution, Al-Naggar was a central operational figure in]. He gained significant media attention on 5 February 2011, amid the violent crackdown known as the "Battle of the Camel." At a moment of high uncertainty regarding the fate of detained activists, Al-Naggar announced to the crowds and international media that], the administrator of the "We Are All Khaled Said" page, was alive and would be released. This intervention is credited with helping to sustain the morale of the protesters during a critical phase of the uprising. He was also associated with the "Committee of Wise Men," a group of intellectuals who attempted to negotiate a peaceful transition of power during the protests.

=== Al-Adl Party and Parliamentary Service ===
Following the ouster of Mubarak, Al-Naggar sought to institutionalize the revolutionary movement. In May 2011, he co-founded the Al-Adl Party (Justice Party), serving on its coordination committee. The party platform emphasized social justice, civil liberties, and a centrist political identity. In October 2012, he resigned from the party's leadership committee to establish a precedent for the rotation of power.

In the 2011–12 Egyptian parliamentary election, Al-Naggar ran for the People's Assembly of Egypt seat in the Nasr City district. The district was considered a political bellwether due to its large population of military families and strong Islamist presence. Al-Naggar won the individual seat, becoming the only member of the Al-Adl Party to secure representation in the parliament.

In parliament, Al-Naggar was an active member of the Human Rights Committee. His legislative tenure was marked by:

- Opposition to Military Trials: He was a vocal critic of the] (SCAF) and consistently moved to end the military trial of civilians.
- The Gizawy Case: He utilized his parliamentary immunity to raise the issue of Ahmed Al-Gizawy, an Egyptian lawyer detained in], demanding the Foreign Ministry intervene to protect the dignity of Egyptians abroad.
- Transitional Justice: He championed legislation aimed at holding security officials accountability for the killing of protesters during the revolution.

The Egyptian Supreme Court dissolved the parliament in June 2012, ending his term abruptly.

== Legal prosecution ==
Following the 2013 Egyptian coup d'état, the political space for centrist and secular opposition narrowed. Al-Naggar was subjected to media smear campaigns, including the airing of alleged private phone calls in what became known as the "Black Box" leaks.

=== "Insulting the Judiciary" Case ===
In 2014, Al-Naggar was charged in Case No. 478 of 2014, widely known as the "Insulting the Judiciary" case. The charges were based on a speech he delivered in parliament in 2012, in which he criticized the judiciary's failure to secure convictions for security officials accused of killing protesters. The case was notable for grouping 25 defendants from across the political spectrum, including deposed president Mohamed Morsi, and liberal activist Alaa Abdel Fattah, accusing them of a common offense against state institutions.

During the investigation, Al-Naggar was placed on a travel ban list in 2014. He was not formally notified of this measure and only learned of it through newspaper reports, a procedural violation highlighted by].

On 30 December 2017, the Cairo Criminal Court sentenced Al-Naggar in absentia to three years in prison and a fine of one million Egyptian pounds. He filed an appeal, which was scheduled for hearing on 15 October 2018.

== Disappearance ==
Al-Naggar has been missing since 28 September 2018. According to his wife, Shymaa Afifi, his last known communication was a phone call in which he stated he was in Aswan (southern Egypt) and intended to return to Cairo to attend his appeal hearing.

=== Theories and Developments ===
- Escape Theory: Friends and fellow activists, including Islam Lotfy, have speculated that Al-Naggar may have traveled to Aswan with the intention of crossing the border into] to flee the prison sentence. Unverified reports circulated among activists suggesting he may have been arrested by border patrols or killed during the attempt, though no material evidence of his death has been produced.
- Enforced Disappearance: His family and international rights groups maintain that he is a victim of enforced disappearance by state security services. In January 2020, an Egyptian administrative court ruled that the Ministry of Interior was obligated to disclose his whereabouts, a decision interpreted by legal experts as a judicial acknowledgement of the validity of the family's claims.

=== Official Reactions ===
On 18 October 2018, shortly after he missed his appeal hearing, Egypt's] (SIS) released a statement categorically denying that Al-Naggar was in police custody. The statement asserted that he was a "fugitive" evading a lawful prison sentence and that the authorities had no knowledge of his location.

International pressure regarding his case has continued. The United Nations Working Group on Enforced or Involuntary Disappearances (WGEID) has received communications regarding his case. In February 2020, US Senator Marco Rubio publicly called on the Egyptian government to reveal Al-Naggar's location.

== Writings ==
Al-Naggar is a published author and columnist, whose work focuses on the intersection of Islamic thought, science, and human rights.

- Books: The Quran: Living Revelation - A Contemporary Study (Al-Qur'an: Al-Wahy al-Hayy). Published by] in 2010, the book argues against the stagnation of religious interpretation and advocates for reading the Quran through a modern, scientific, and humanistic lens.
- Journalism: He was a regular columnist for the independent newspapers AlShorouk and AlMasry AlYoum, where his articles frequently critiqued political polarization and authoritarianism.

== See also ==
- Enforced disappearance
- Human rights in Egypt
- Al-Adl Party
