= Civilization Party =

Civilization Party حزب الحضارة
- Chairman: Mohamed El-Sawy
- Founded: 2011; 15 years ago
- Ideology: Liberalism; Secularism; Moderate Islam
- Political position: Center
- House of Representatives: 0 / 568

The Egypt Civilization Party, or El-Hadara, is a secular, liberal political party established in Egypt in 2011. It describes itself as "in the center: in the right-wing economically, and left-wing socially."

== History ==
The party was founded by Mohamed al-Sawy, one of the two Al-Hadara members to be elected to the People's Assembly in the 2011-2012 parliamentary elections. Another prominent party member is Hatem Khater, head of the Egyptian Food Bank.

The party was formerly part of the Moderate Current Coalition and the Centrist Coalition.

== Electoral history ==
=== People's Assembly elections ===
Election	Seats	+/–
2011–12 (as part of Democratic Alliance for Egypt)	2 / 596	▲2
