= Mohamed El-Sawy =

Egyptian engineer, cultural entrepreneur and politician

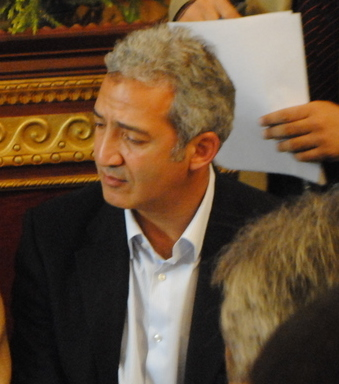
- El-Sawi At the Press Conference of the Political Parties regarding the events in Tahrir
- Born: November 2, 1956 (age 69)
- Occupations: Engineer; Politician; Writer

Mohammed El-Sawi is an Egyptian engineer, cultural entrepreneur and politician. He is the founder of the cultural centre El Sawy Culturewheel and the Civilization Party.

== Life ==
Mohamed El-Sawy is the son of Abdel Moneim El-Sawy, a novelist and former Minister of Culture as part of the Shafik Cabinet He founded the El Sawy Culturewheel as a cultural centre in 2003, naming it after his father.

In February 2011, shortly after disavowing interest in the position, Mohamed El-Sawy was appointed minister of culture.

Later in 2011 he founded the Civilization Party (El-Hadara). He was returned to the People's Assembly of Egypt as an MP for Giza in the 2011-12 elections. In March 2012 he became one of the 50 parliamentarians elected to the Constituent Assembly of Egypt, and kept his place in the Constituent Assembly when it was revamped in June 2012.
