= Reawakening of Egypt =

Defunct Egyptian electoral alliance

Reawakening of Egypt صحوة مصر Sahwet Misr
- Leader: Abdelgelil Mostafa
- Founded: 2014
- Dissolved: 11 September 2015
- Ideology: Big tent Factions: Democratic socialism Communism; Secularism; Nasserism; Islamism; Social liberalism
- Political position: Centre to far-left

The Reawakening of Egypt (Arabic: صحوة مصر, romanized: Sahwet Misr), also translated Egypt's Renaissance, was an electoral alliance in Egypt that was established by Abdelgelil Mostafa to contest the 2015 Egyptian parliamentary election. It withdrew from the election in September 2015.

== History ==
The alliance was created by Abdelgelil Mostafa, who aimed to create an electoral list which excluded the Muslim Brotherhood and former members of the National Democratic Party. 120 candidates would have been selected to run. The 25-30 Alliance had stated that it was not part of the alliance. The parties affiliated with the National Front Alliance joined the Reawakening of Egypt. The Dignity Party withdrew from the alliance after several Dignity Party candidates were not selected for the electoral lists.

The alliance was expected to be one of the "strongest.. left wing party lists" that was participating in the election.

The alliance initially submitted electoral lists for all of the four constituencies. The alliance however refused to repeat costly medical examinations even for candidates already examined in February 2015, and went to the Administrative Court requesting free medical examination and a reopening of the candidate application. The court, however, upheld the requirement. The medical exams cost LE 2,850. After an appeal was turned down by Egypt's Supreme Administrative Court, the alliance withdrew all of its lists in September 2015, preempting their inevitable rejection by the High Election Commission.

Several parties which were part of the alliance, including the Socialist Popular Alliance Party and the Egyptian Social Democratic Party, ran for individual seats, after it withdrew from the election. However, according to Ahmed Fawzy, the secretary general of the ESDP, his party was not part of the alliance, though the list did include ESDP members.

=== Affiliated parties and coalitions ===
- National Bloc
- Socialist Party of Egypt
- Egyptian Communist Party
- Civil Democratic Current
- Egyptian Democratic
- Nasserist Party
- Future of Egypt Party
- National Progressive Unionist Party (Tagammu)
- Conference Party
- Socialist Popular Alliance Party
- Justice Party
- Reform and Renaissance Party
