= Abdelgelil Mostafa =

Personal details
- Born: December 25, 1934 (age 91) Dakahlia; Egypt
- Party: Justice Party
- Occupation: Political activist Cardiologist

Abdelgelil Mostafa is an Egyptian cardiologist and a political activist.

Mostafa studied medicine at the Cairo University, and received his doctoral degree in 1966.

Before the 2011 Egyptian revolution, Mostafa was the general coordinator of the Egyptian Movement for Change. After the 2011 Egyptian Revolution, he joined the Justice Party as a founding member. Mostafa was involved in preparing the Reawakening of Egypt electoral list that planned to run in the 2015 Egyptian parliamentary election. The alliance withdrew from the election and several of the involved parties planned to run for individual seats.
