= Al Arabi (newspaper) =

Weekly newspaper in Egypt

- Type: Weekly newspaper
- Owner(s): Nasserist Party
- Political alignment: Nasserist
- Language: Arabic
- Headquarters: Cairo
- Country: Egypt

Al Arabi is a newspaper based in Cairo, Egypt. It is the organ of the Nasserist Party. In the 1990s the paper was one of the opposition publications. In 1998 one of the editors of the paper was arrested and given six-month prison sentence due to the alleged defamation of a pro-government writer, Tharwat Abaza. In 1999 the party declared that it could not finance the paper anymore, and the Egyptian government proposed to provide financial support to the paper. However, the party did not accept the proposal, but reduced the frequency of Al Arabi from daily to weekly.

Former editors-in-chief of the paper include Abdel Halim Qandil and Nasser Abu Tahoun. Of them Qandil held the post until 2007. Another editor-in-chief was Mahmoud Al Maraghi. Mohamed Fayek, a cabinet member during the presidency of Gamal Abdel Nasser, was among the former chairmen of its board.
