= El Sawy Culture Wheel =

Cultural center in Gezira Island, Cairo, Egypt

Coordinates: 30°03′44.2″N 31°12′59.1″E

El Sawy Cultural Centre
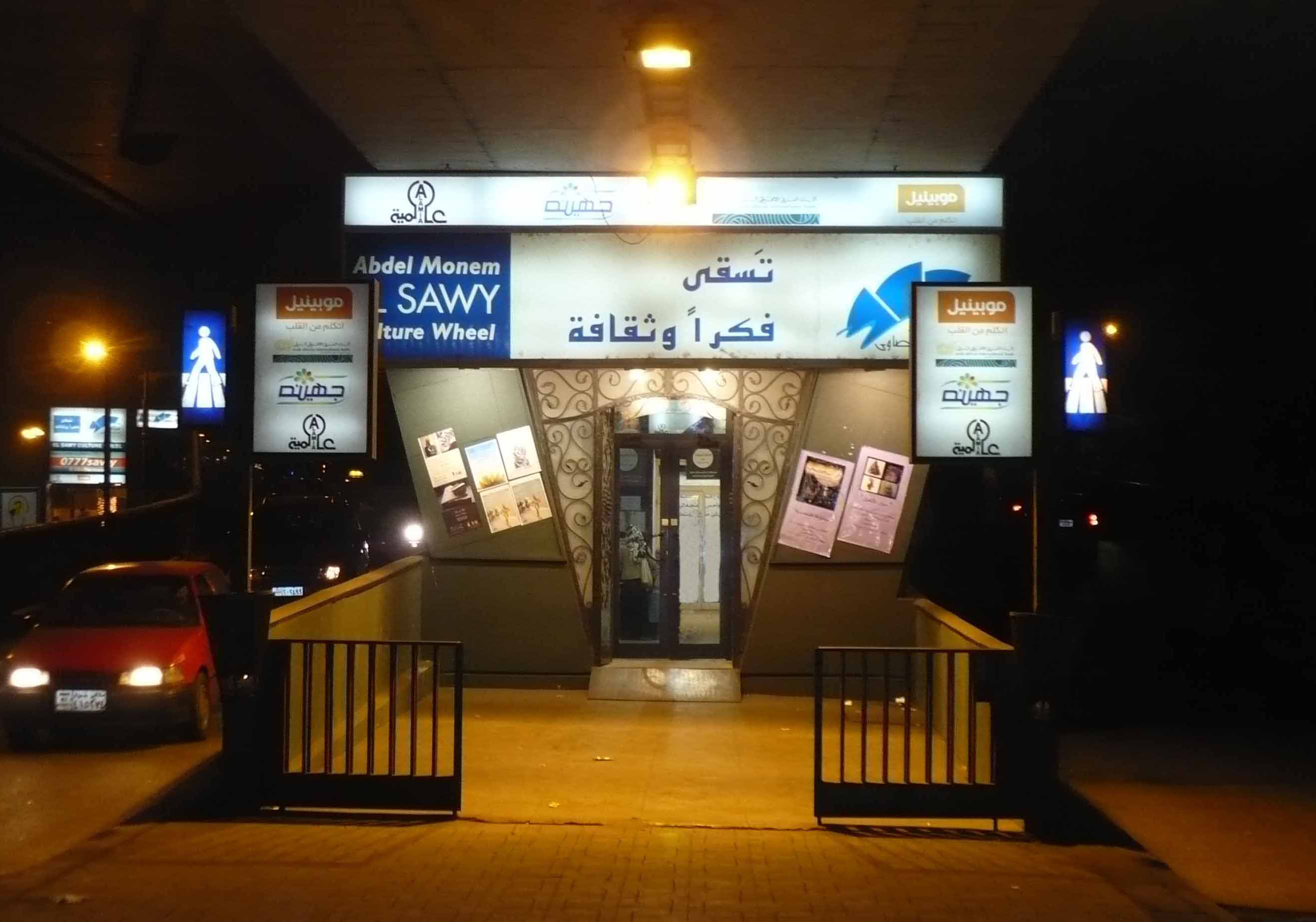
- El Sawy Culture Wheel, entrance
- Interactive map of the El Sawy Cultural Centre area

General information
- Location: Zamalek, Cairo, Egypt
- Completed: 2003
- Owner: Mohamed El-Sawy

Other information
- Parking: On site

El Sawy Culture Wheel (Egyptian Arabic: ساقية الصاوى, transliterated: Sakkiat Al-Sawy) is a cultural center on Gezira Island in the Zamalek district on central Cairo, Egypt. Named after its founder and owner, Abdelmoniem El-Sawy, it is considered one of the most important cultural venues in Egypt and receives more than 20,000 visitors each month.

== History ==
El Sawy Culture Wheel was established in 2003 by Mohamed El-Sawy. Prior to its construction, its location, beneath the 15th May Bridge in Zamalek, was a shelter for homeless people and those struggling with addiction. El-Sawy named his center in honor of the five-part novel series: "El-Sakkia" (lit. 'The Wheel') written by his father, Abdel Moneim El-Sawy, an Egyptian novelist and a former minister of culture.

== Locations and halls ==
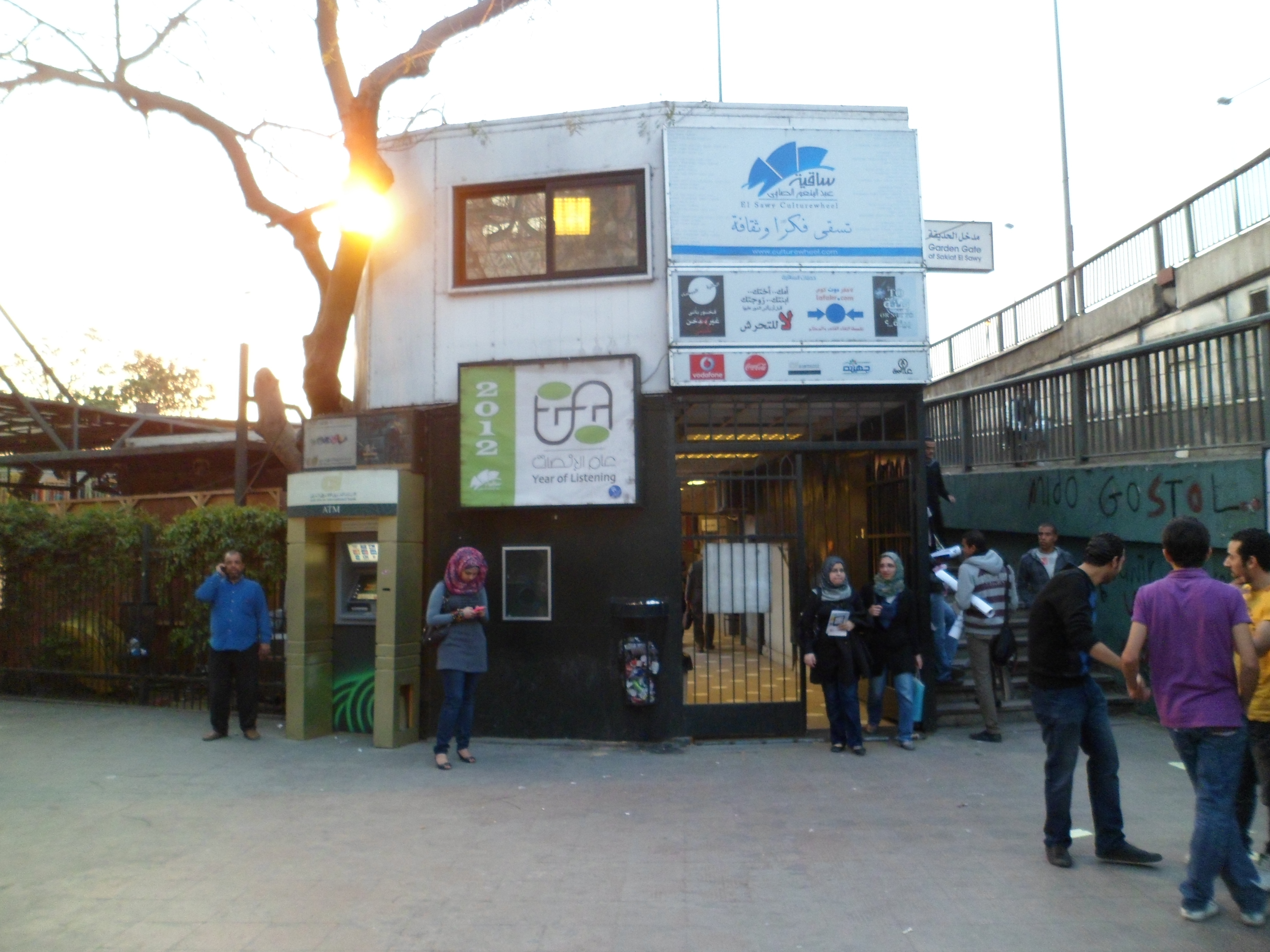
Entrance gate 2

As of April 2009, El Sawy Culture Wheel has 3 branches: the main branch in Zamalek, a branch in Algeel Algadeed school, and a temporary branch in Qena. The main branch has eight halls: Wisdom hall, River hall, Earth hall, Word halls 1 and 2, Garden Hall, El Naseeb and Bostan El Nil. The permanent premises in Qena is scheduled for opening in Ramadan, 2009.

== Activities ==
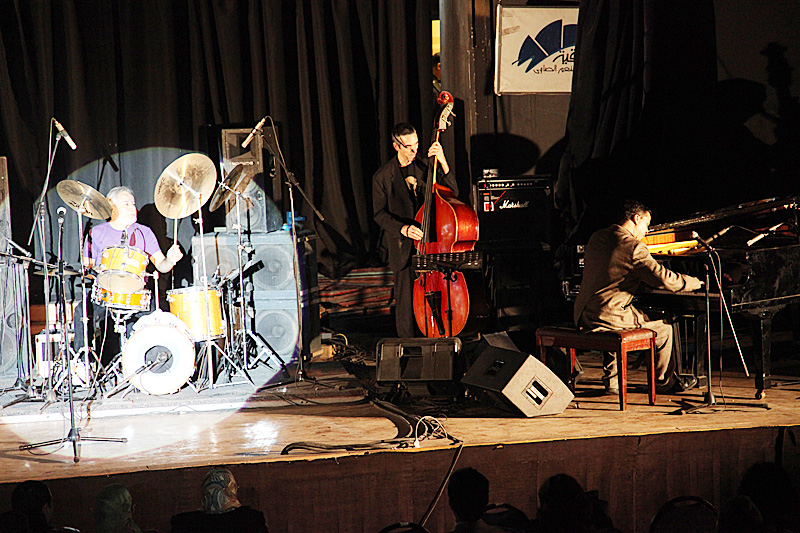
Cairo Jazz concert

The center is home for various activities and cultural events. Every year, it chooses a main theme for most of its events, the 2009 theme was "dignity", through which it aimed to address some social problems, such as begging. The center has organized hundreds of concerts and musical events, including those for oud, jazz, musical theatre, children chorus and performances for several Egyptian and Arab bands, singers and entertainers. It also hosts several seminars, workshops, art exhibitions, book fairs and movie shows.

It is allegedly a non-government controlled private cultural centert and its events are claimed to have more freedom and higher quality than those in government-controlled centers. It is, however, owned by members of parliament. In addition, it organizes a number of conferences and festivals, including an annual theatre festival, the "Sakkia animated film festival", El Sawy culture wheel festival for documentaries, and the El Sakkia conference for Arabic language and Poet Laureate Ahmed Shawqi.

The Sawy includes several sections for arts and music training and a number of libraries, including a music library and children's library. and it offers several art classes in painting, sculpture, piano and violin for children and youth.
