= Independent Current Coalition =

Independent Current Coalition تيار الاستقلال
- Founded: 15 June 2014
- Ideology: Big tent Factions: Islamic democracy Liberal democracy Islamic socialism Arab socialism Civic nationalism
- Political position: Centre-left to left-wing
- National affiliation: Egypt
- House of Representatives: 5 / 568

The Independent Current Coalition (Arabic: تيار الاستقلال, romanized: Tayyar al-Istiqlal) was an alliance of political parties contesting the 2014 Egyptian parliamentary election in a joint list with the Egyptian Front, called Egypt.

== History ==
The alliance was established on 15 June 2014 by the Independent Party Current, which has been active since December 2012. The alliance was also called the Supporting the President coalition. The general coordinator of the alliance was Hamdy al-Fakharany. The coalition was made up of 36 parties.

== Affiliated parties ==
- Democratic Peace Party
- Egyptian Arab Socialist Party
- Revolutionary Forces Bloc
