= Ahmed Tantawi =

Egyptian journalist (born 1979)

- أحمد طنطاوي
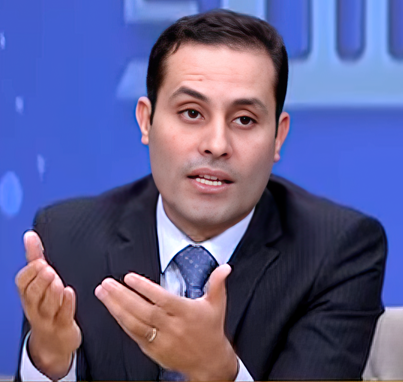

Member of the Egyptian House of Representatives
- In office 2015–2020

Personal details
- Born: 25 July 1979 (age 46) Qallin, Kafr el-Sheikh Governorate, Egypt
- Party: 25-30 Alliance

Ahmed Mohamed Ramadan Tantawi known as Ahmed Tantawi also: Al-Tantawy (Arabic: أحمد محمد رمضان الطنطاوي; born 25 July 1979) is an Egyptian politician and journalist. As of July 2022, he was the former head of the Dignity Party and a former member of the Egyptian House of Representatives. In 2023, Tantawi announced his potential candidacy for the 2023 Egyptian presidential election but repressive tactics, including retaliatory detentions of his family members, supporters and campaign members, prevented his campaign from collecting the 25,000 voters' endorsements required to officially file his candidacy.

== Political career ==
=== 2015-2020 parliament ===
Tantawi was a member of the 25-30 Alliance created for the 2015 Egyptian parliamentary election, whose name refers to the 2011 Egyptian revolution that started on 25 January 2011 and the 30 June 2013 protests that led to the overthrow of President Mohamed Morsi. He was elected to the Egyptian House of Representatives in the 2015 election in the individual component of the second phase of the election, along with 13 others in the alliance.

On 14 February 2019, Tantawi was one of the 16 members of parliament (MPs) who voted against the parliamentary motion for amending the Egyptian constitution, that led to the 2019 Egyptian constitutional referendum in April 2019. The motion was supported by 485 members.

On 3 November 2019, Tantawi posted a YouTube video in which he proposed that Egyptian President Abdel Fattah el-Sisi leave power in 2022, rather than in 2024 as defined in the 2019 constitutional amendment. Tantawi later discussed his video with Mada Masr, stating that his aim was to protect Egypt from the "imminent danger" of el-Sisi continuing in power too long, that it was consistent with el-Sisi's promises, and that this should satisfy el-Sisi's supporters.

Tantawi also submitted a formal request under parliamentary procedure to Ali Abdel Aal, Speaker of the House of Representatives, proposing that 12 parliamentary committees be created to "generate a national dialogue about the political, economic and social problems facing the country". He described his aim as a serious attempt to solve "the real crisis Egypt is living through, which authorities should pay attention to before it is too late" and that the proposal would help to "absorb public outrage". Tantawi expressed his worry that a violent reaction by authorities to his initiative would discourage the people from choosing political methods of change.

On 5 November in a parliamentary sitting, MP Mahmoud Badr called Tantawi's proposal an "outright violation of the constitution". Speaker Abdel Aal stated that he "[does] not have any initiatives" and "[does] not pay attention to this sort of talk. ... There are red lines, including the nation, political leadership and Egypt's military and police. Insulting them is not permitted." Ninety-five MPs submitted a request to Abdel Aal to refer Tantawi to the parliament's Ethics Committee, on the grounds that Tantawi's initiative "undermines the Egyptian state and its institutions".

The Civil Democratic Movement stated that it supported the initiative, which was consistent with its own 10-point proposal announced in late October 2019.

Tantawi lost his seat in a runoff in the 2020 Egyptian parliamentary election.

=== Dignity Party ===
Tantawi was elected head of the Dignity Party in 25 December 2020, replacing Muhammad Sami. He left the position in July 2022.

=== Hope Current ===
He formed the Hope Current in October 2024 and announced in July 2025 that it would run in the 2025 Egyptian parliamentary election.

=== Candidacy for the 2023 Egyptian elections ===
In March 2023, Tantawi announced his intention to run for the 2023 presidential elections before his return from a trip to Lebanon. He posted a video on his social media pages presenting himself as a "civilian democratic alternative".

==== Obstructions and harassment ====
In late September 2023 and early October, Tantawi began touring for his campaign in "Giza, downtown Cairo, Alexandria, Qalyubiya, Beheira, Gharbeia, Daqahliya and Kafr El Sheikh." Throughout his campaign, Tantawi faced a lot of politically motivated restrictions and repressions including security forces banning hotels across Egypt from hosting Tantawi's campaign, registration offices refusing to accept citizens' endorsement forms and even in some cases the ruling party gathered protestors to harass and prevent Tantawi and his supporters from entering registration offices.

It was also revealed that security forces hacked into Tantawi's iPhone by a network injected Predator spyware through Vodafone Egypt mobile connection. Both Citizen Lab and Google's Threat Analysis Group indicated that the attempts began as early as May and continued through August, using various methods, leading Apple to issue security updates on 21 September to patch the vulnerabilities exploited by the spyware.

On 13 October, Tantawi announced that he failed to meet the minimum quota of 25,000 endorsements managing only to secure around 14,000, hence his bid for the presidential elections was unsuccessful.

== Arrest and release ==
In retaliation to challenging the sitting president, and then main candidate, Abdel Fattah el-Sisi, El-Sisi's government issued an arrest warrant against Tantawi in an alleged case of forgery. Tantawi and his electoral campaign manager, Mohamed Abu El-Diyar, were sentenced initially to two years in prison but the court ordered them to pay a bail of 20,000 Egyptian pounds (almost US$645) each for the sentence to be suspended and appealed later before a higher court. On 27 May 2024, in a final ruling the court sentenced Tantawi to one year in prison and a five year ban from contesting presidential elections. On 31 May 2024, the United Nations called for Tantawi's immediate release, expressing deep concern over his arrest.

Tantawi was released from prison in May 2025.
