= 25-30 Alliance =

25-30 Alliance تحالف 25-30
- Leader: Haitham El-Hariri (2018)
- Founded: 20 July 2014
- Ideology: Feminism; Youth politics Electoral reform Secularism; Factions: Egyptian nationalism Liberalism
- Political position: Centre-left
- House of Representatives: 2 / 568

The 25-30 Alliance (Arabic: تحالف 25-30) is an alliance of independents created to run in the 2015 Egyptian parliamentary election of 17 October to 2 December 2015.

== History ==
=== Creation ===
The alliance was created on 20 July 2014 and refers to the revolution that overthrew Hosni Mubarak on 25 January 2011 and the overthrow of Mohamed Morsi on 30 June 2013. In July 2014, members of the April 6 Youth Movement and Tamarod stated that they would join the alliance. The Free Egyptians Party stated that it might join the alliance.

Abdel-Hakim Abdel Nasser, son of former Egyptian president Gamal Abdel Nasser, was one of the founders of the alliance.

=== Structure ===
As of January 2018, the 25-30 Alliance was led by Haitham El-Hariri.

=== Policies and strategy ===
The alliance included 25% quotas for women and youth in its electoral lists.

The electoral strategy of the members of the alliance was to run for individual seats rather than as a formal group.

The alliance stated in March 2015 that it was not part of the Reawakening of Egypt list.

=== 2015 Parliament ===
The 25-30 Alliance obtained roughly 30 seats in the 2015 Egyptian parliamentary election, though the number of seats held by the alliance decreased to 14 by 2018.

On 14 February 2019, 25-30 Alliance member of parliament Ahmed Tantawi was one of the 16 members who voted against the parliamentary motion for amending the Egyptian constitution that led to the 2019 Egyptian constitutional referendum in April 2019. The motion was supported by 485 members.

=== 2020 Parliament ===
The size of the alliance decreased further by 2020, with only two members (Diaa El-Din Dawood and Ahmed el-Sharkawy) regaining their seats.
