= Dalia Ziada =

Egyptian writer

- داليا زيادة
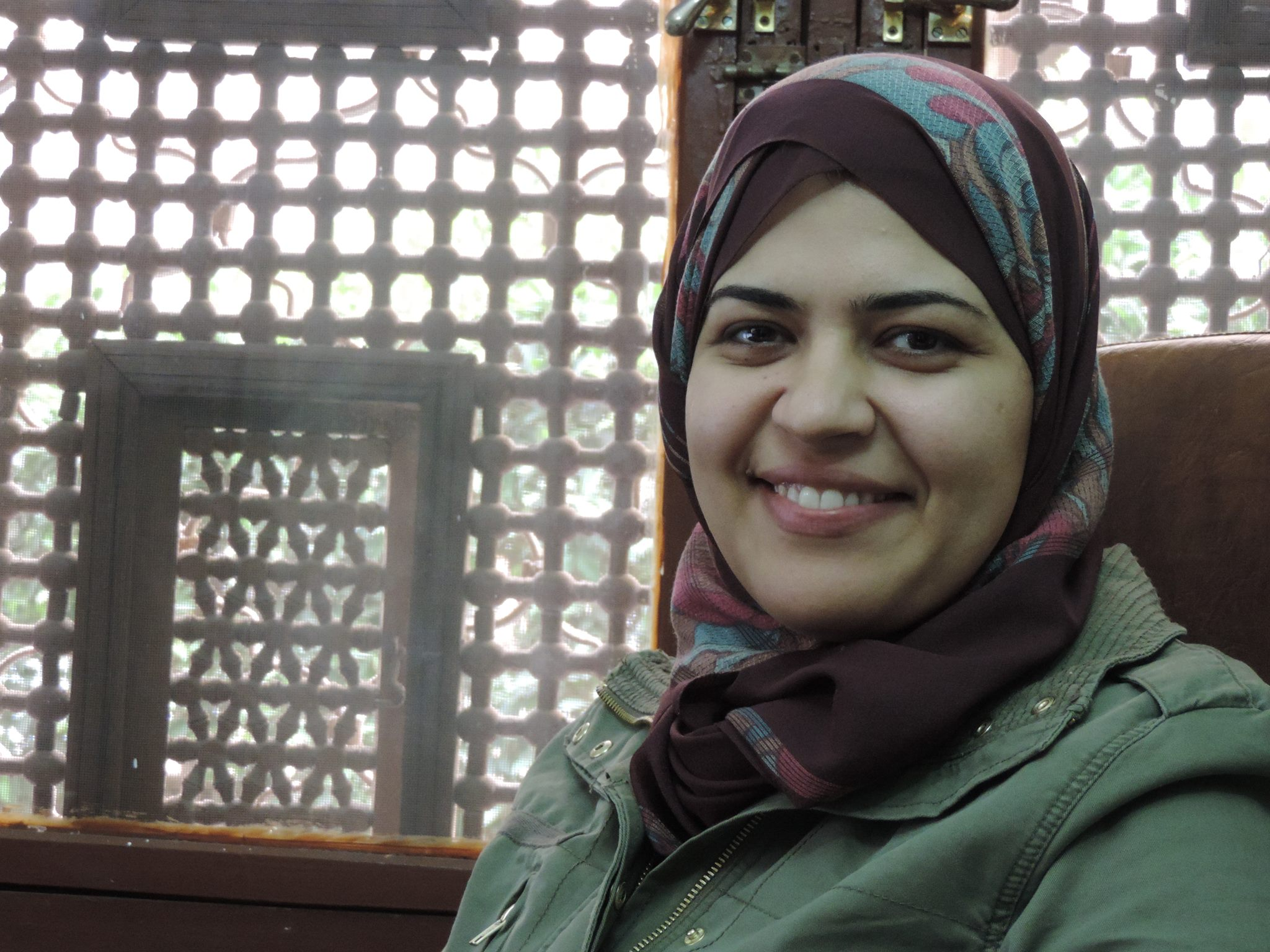
- Born: January 2, 1982 (age 44); Cairo, Egypt
- Education: International Security (at Fletcher School of Law and Diplomacy, Tufts University)
- Occupations: Writer, Activist
- Known for: Author of "The Curious Case of the Three-Legged Wolf - Egypt: Military, Islamism, and Liberal Democracy"; Civil society movement in Egypt's 2011 revolution; Advocacy for liberal democratization in Egypt
- Awards: Distinguished Alumni Award, Fletcher School of Law and Diplomacy (2014); Presidential Award for Citizenship and Public Service, Tufts University (2011); Anna Lindh Euro-Mediterranean Journalist Award (2010)

Dalia Ziada (in Arabic: داليا زيادة; born 2 January 1982) is an Egyptian writer and human rights activist. She is the author of The Curious Case of the Three-Legged Wolf - Egypt: Military, Islamism, and Liberal Democracy and other books on Middle East politics as well as an active blogger. She is the Chairperson of the Liberal Democracy Institute, and executive director of MEEM Center for Middle East and Eastern Mediterranean Studies.

Ziada was very involved in the civil society movement that initiated Egypt's 2011 revolution against the Mubarak regime and demonstrated in the streets. She was also one of the founders of the Eladl Party(Justice). For these activities she was named by CNN as one of eight agents of change in the Middle East, and by The Daily Beast as one of the most fearless women in the world.

Robin Wright, who wrote about her, called Ziada a leading member of the "pink hijab generation, young women committed to their faith, firm in their femininity, and resolute about their rights".

== Early life and education ==
Dalia Ziada was born in Cairo, Egypt. Her mother is an Arabic school teacher and her late father was a Lt.Cl. engineer in the Egyptian Armed Forces. Ziada studied international security at the Fletcher School of Law and Diplomacy at Tufts University in the United States.

== Career ==
Ziada worked as the executive director of Ibn Khaldun Center for Democratic Studies, and as regional director for The American Islamic Congress. Currently, she leads two think tanks: Liberal Democracy Institute, and MEEM Center for Middle East and Eastern Mediterranean Studies. In addition, she is a board member of the Foreign Affairs Committee at the National Council for Women in Egypt.

Ziada is a regular contributor to regional and international publications (in Arabic, English, and Turkish) on issues related to geopolitics and defense policy in the Middle East, the Mediterranean, and Africa. Since 2006, she has run a bilingual blog commenting on issues related to human rights, civil freedom, civil-military affairs, and international relations. In 2010, the Anna Lindh Euro-Mediterranean Foundation for the Dialogue Between Cultures awarded her its Euro-Mediterranean Journalist Award for her blog.

Dalia’s next book project, “The Coalition of Odds” explores the new Middle East emerging from the changing geopolitical coalitions.

=== 2023 war ===
During the Gaza war, Ziada expressed strong support for Israel's military actions against Hamas. Her public stance led to significant backlash in Egypt, resulting in threats to her safety and accusations of espionage and incitement of war crimes. Ziada condemned Hamas for its attack on Israel on October 7, which resulted in significant civilian casualties and abductions. She argued that the Israeli military's response, aimed at dislodging Hamas from power in Gaza and securing the release of hostages, was justified.

These remarks sparked a significant controversy, leading to her going into hiding due to safety concerns. Her stance was seen as particularly controversial in Egypt, where public opinion tends to be critical of Israel and sympathetic towards the Palestinian cause. Despite the threats and legal challenges she faced, Ziada maintained her position, advocating for peace and condemning the actions of Islamist organizations, including Hamas.

== Bibliography ==
=== Published books ===
- Author, The Curious Case of the Three-Legged Wolf - Egypt: Military, Islamism, and Liberal Democracy; Liberal Democracy Institute 2019
- Co-author, Paradox of Repression and Nonviolent Movements; Syracuse University Press 2018
- Editor, The Status-quo of Civil Society and Liberal Democratization in the Arab World; Ibn Khaldun Center 2012
- Co-author, A Modern Narrative for Muslim Women in the Middle East; American Islamic Congress 2010
- Author, Lam Alef, a collection of poetry in Arabic; Maktoub Publishing 2009
- Translator, Civil Rights and the Montgomery Story, comic book in Arabic; American Islamic Congress 2008
- Editor, Egypt, Whereto? The Future of Democratic Reform; Tharwa Foundation 2008
- Translator, Implacable Adversaries: Arab Governments and The Internet; Arab Network for Human Rights 2006

== Awards and honors ==
- Received the Distinguished Alumni Award from The Fletcher School of Law and Diplomacy, Tufts University (2014)
- Selected by The Diplomatic Courier as one of the “99 Foreign Policy Leaders under 33 years old” (2013)
- Named by Newsweek for two years in a row (2011-2012) as one of the world's “most influential” and most “fearless women,” consecutively
- Named by CNN as one of Arab world's “eight agents of change” (2012)
- Selected by The Daily Beast as one of the world's 17 bravest bloggers (2011)
- Received Tufts University's Presidential Award for Citizenship and Public Service (2011)
- Received Anna Lindh Euro-Mediterranean Journalist Award for her blog (2010)

== Books about Ziada ==
- Robin Wright, Rock the Casbah: Rage and Rebellion across the Islamic World. 2012, Simon and Schuster, ISBN 978-1-4391-0317-3
- Lily Eskelsen Garcia, Rabble Rousers: Fearless Fighters for Social Justice. 2014 National Education Association, ISBN 978-0-8106-2042-1
