= Mohamed Fayek =

Egyptian politician (born 1929)

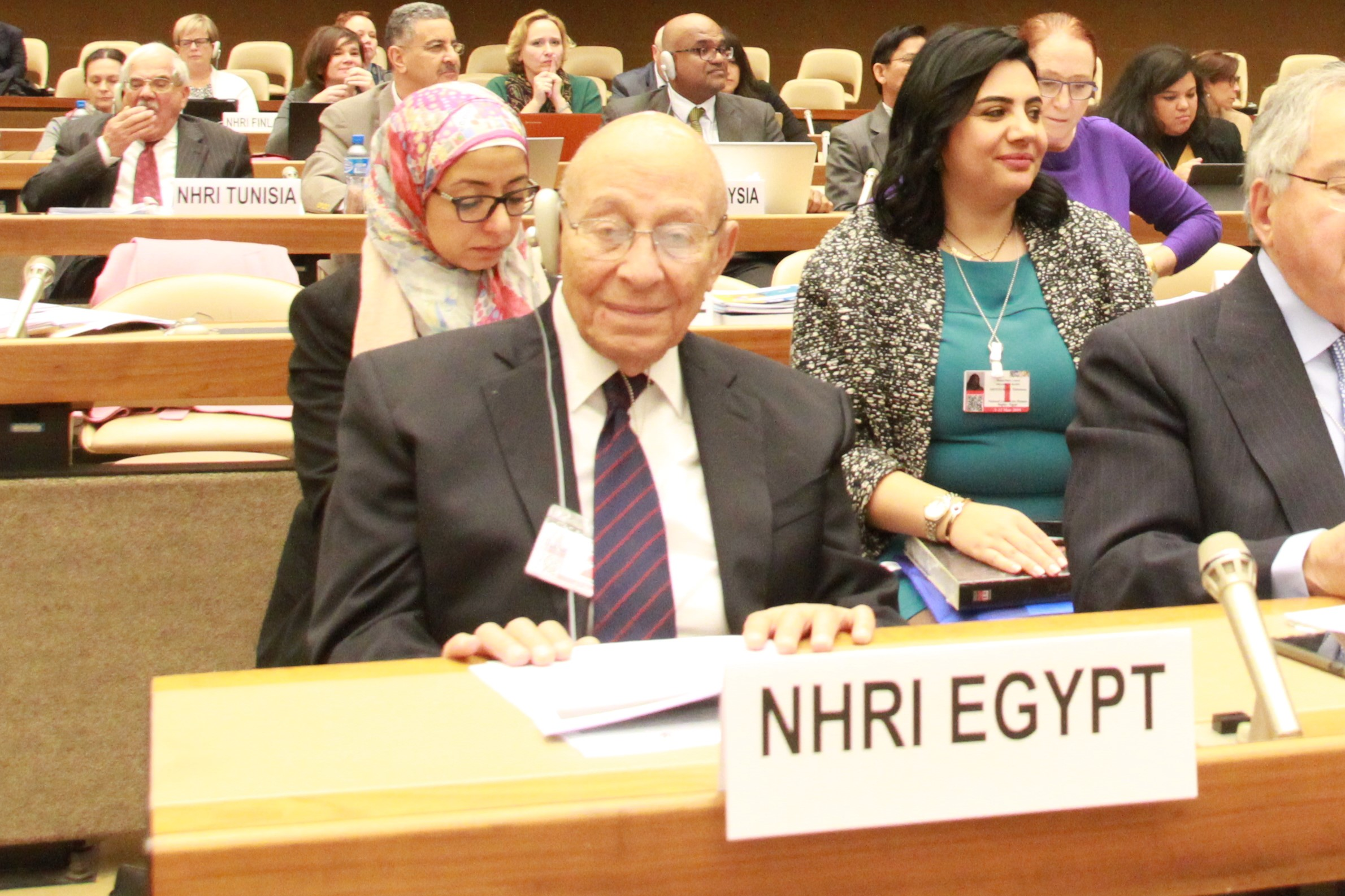

Minister of State for Foreign Affairs
- In office April 1970 – May 1971
- President: Gamal Abdel Nasser; Anwar Sadat

Minister of Information
- In office 1968 – April 1970
- President: Gamal Abdel Nasser
- Succeeded by: Mohamed Hassanein Heikal

Minister of National Guidance
- In office 1967–1967
- President: Gamal Abdel Nasser

Personal details
- Born: 1929 (age 96–97) Cairo, Kingdom of Egypt
- Children: 2
- Education: Military Academy

Mohamed Fayek (born 1929) is an Egyptian politician who held various cabinet posts from 1967 to 1971 during the presidency of Gamal Abdel Nasser. He was the minister of national guidance in 1967, the minister of information between 1968 and 1970 and the state minister for foreign affairs between 1970 and 1971. He was also elected as a deputy to the People's Assembly in 1968.

== Early life and education ==
Fayek was born in Cairo in 1929. He received a university degree and was a graduate of the Military Academy.

== Career and arrest ==
Fayek worked as an intelligence officer and was part of the Free Officers Movement which ended the reign of King Farouk in 1952. Fayek headed the Bureau of Gamal Abdel Nasser after Nasser became the President of Egypt and was his legal adviser for African and Asian affairs. Between 1955 and 1966 Fayek was the head of the African Affairs Bureau attached to the Presidency. He also served as the vice-president of the Egyptian Committee for Afro-Asian Solidarity.

In June 1967 Fayek was appointed minister of national guidance and headed the Egyptian delegation to the African Summit in September 1967. He was elected to the People's Assembly in 1968 and served there for two terms representing the Kasr El Nil constituency of Cairo. He became minister of information in 1968 which he held until April 1970. When Fayek was in office the Six-Day War between the United Arab Republic (UAR) composed of Egypt, Jordan and Syria and Israel occurred, and the UAR was defeated which led to the resignation of Gamal Abdel Nasser. Just before his resignation Nasser told Fayek that he would be tried and hanged in the middle of Cairo. During the same period a Bureau of African Affairs was formed to support the African liberation movements against former colonial countries and headed by Fayek. Mohamed Hassanein Heikal replaced Fayek as minister of information.

Next Fayek served as the minister of state for foreign affairs between April 1970 and May 1971. On 13 May 1971 Fayek resigned from the post with three other cabinet members. President Anwar Sadat, successor of Nasser, was informed about their resignations by Ashraf Marwan, son-in-law of Gamal Abdel Nasser, at his home. These officials are called the May group which was consisted of the Nasser supporters. Fayek had been the head of Bureau of African Affairs during his tenure as the minister of state for foreign affairs. He was removed from office by the President Sadat and was also arrested because of his alleged involvement in the planning of a coup against Sadat. He was jailed for ten years.

Following his release from the prison Fayek assumed various positions in the organizations such as Arab Organization for Human Rights. One of his posts in the organization was the special rapporteur on refugees, asylum seekers, internally displaced persons and migrants in Africa. He also headed a publishing company entitled Dar Al Mustaqbal Al Arabi (Arabic: Arab Future Publishing House) which publishes work by liberal scholars and writers such as Galal Amin, Ismail Sabri Abdullah and Edwar al-Kharrat.

As of 2011 Fayek was serving as the chairman of the Egyptian Ombudsman Office. He was also the chairman of the board of directors of Al Arabi, a Nasserist newspaper. He is the president of the Egyptian National Council for Human Rights, the chairman of the Nile Valley Family Association and a board member of the Boutros Ghali Foundation.

== Personal life and work ==
Fayek is married and has two children. The Egyptian musician Nadya Shanab is his granddaughter.

In 1984 Fayek's mémoire entitled Abdel Nasser wal Thawra Al-Afriqiyya (Arabic: Abdel Nasser and the African Revolution) was published by Dar Alwehda in Beirut, Lebanon.
