= Social Justice Coalition (2014) =

- Founder: Gamal Zahran
- Founded: July 2014
- Ideology: Liberalism; Factions: Arab nationalism Secularism; Liberal democracy Liberal socialism Constitutional democracy Parliamentary republic Government intervention
- Political position: Centre
- House of Representatives: 0 / 568

The Social Justice Coalition, also translated as the Social Justice Alliance, was a leftist electoral alliance in Egypt called for by the National Association for Change; it would have competed in the 2015 Egyptian parliamentary election.

== History ==
The alliance was formed in July 2014 and later expanded to 27 different parties and movements. The Egyptian Communist Party, the Equality and Development Party and the Quiver Party left the alliance.

== Formerly affiliated parties ==
- National Association for Change
- Nasserist People's Congress Party
- National Conciliation Party
- Knights of Egypt Party
- Revolution Egypt Party
- Liberal Socialist Party
- People Party
- Democratic Union Party
- Free Social Constitutional Party
- Egypt's Future Party
- Socialist Labour Party
- Revolutionary Rescue Party
- Egyptian National Council
- Greenpeace Movement
- Coalition of Egyptians Abroad
- National Youth Council
- Senior Nasserist Conference
