= Egyptian Revolution Party =

Political party in Egypt

- Leader: Tarek Zeidan
- National affiliation: Call of Egypt
- House of Representatives: 0 / 568

The Egyptian Revolution Party is an Egyptian political party. The party ran in the Egyptian 2011-2012 parliamentary election.
