= Hazem Omar =

Egyptian politician

Hazem Omar حازم عمر

President of the Republican People's Party
- Incumbent
- Assumed office 12 September 2012
- Preceded by: Position established

Personal details
- Born: Cairo, Egypt
- Party: Republican People's Party (since 2012)
- Education: Cairo University

Hazem Omar is an Egyptian politician. He is the head of the Republican People's Party and a senator among 100 members appointed by President Abdel Fattah el-Sisi in December 2020.

== Career ==
Omar was appointed to the Egyptian Senate in 2020.

=== 2023 Egyptian presidential election ===
On 7 July 2023, the Republican People's Party nominated Omar to run for in the 2023 presidential election, as the official candidate for the Republican People's Party. He finished in second place with 4.5% of the vote.
