= National Partnership Current =

National Partnership Current Tayyar Al-Sharaka Al-Wataneya
- Leader: Shady Gazaly Harb
- Spokesperson: Mahmoud Afifi
- Founded: 23 October 2013

The National Partnership Current is a political movement in Egypt that aims to unite "advocates" of 25 January revolution and 30 June. The movement backed Hamdeen Sabahi in the 2014 Egyptian presidential election.
