= Modern Egypt Party =

Modern Egypt Party حزب مصر الحديثة
- Leader: Nabil Dibis
- Spokesperson: Kamal El-Eslamboly
- Founded: 3 July 2011
- Political position: Centre-right
- National affiliation: National Unified List for Egypt (2020)
- House of Representatives: 0 / 596

The Modern Egypt Party (Arabic: حزب مصر الحديثة Hizb Masr al-Haditha) is an Egyptian political party made up of former members of the National Democratic Party, the former ruling party in Egypt.

== History ==
The Modern Egypt Party joined the Egyptian Front alliance in August 2014 and withdrew from it in May 2015. Several months later, in August 2015, it joined the For the Love of Egypt alliance and won four seats in that year's parliamentary election.

The party joined the National Unified List for Egypt ahead of the 2020 Egyptian parliamentary election, winning eleven seats.

Various candidates affiliated with the party ran in the 2025 Egyptian parliamentary election.

== Electoral history ==
=== House of Representatives elections ===
Election	Seats	+/–
2015 (as part of For the Love of Egypt)	4 / 596	▲4
2020 (as part of National Unified List for Egypt)	11 / 596	▲7
