= Free Nation Coalition =

Defunct Egyptian electoral alliance

Free Nation Coalition Al-Watan Al-Hur
- Founded: February 2013
- Ideology: Islamism; Factions: Salafism; Economic liberalism Conservatism
- Political position: Centre-right

The Free Nation Coalition was an Islamist electoral alliance in Egypt.

== History ==
The alliance included the following parties at its February 2013 launch: Building and Development Party, the Authenticity Party, the Homeland Party (which had separated from the Al-Nour Party) and the Flag Party. The Authenticity Party and Flag Party joined the Nation Alliance in March.
