= Knights of Egypt Party =

Knights of Egypt Party فرسان حزب مصر
- Founded: August 2013
- Ideology: Liberalism
- House of Representatives: 0 / 568

The Knights of Egypt Party (Arabic: فرسان حزب مصر) is a political party in Egypt founded by former members of the Egyptian military. The party is running in the 2015 Egyptian parliamentary election.
