= Nabil Dibis =

Egyptian businessman and politician

Nabil Dibis is an Egyptian businessman and politician currently serving a senator in the Egyptian Senate. He is the founder and chairman of the Modern Egypt Party (Hizb Masr al-Haditha).

== Career ==
Dibis, a businessman, is the founder of Modern Egypt University and his son Walid is the owner of Modern Egypt Television – a pro Hosni Mubarak regime media. Dibis is a well-known ally of the deposed President Hosni Mubarak. Dibis was a member of the defunct National Democratic Party. After the Egyptian revolution in 2011, he founded Modern Egypt Party in a build-up to the 2011/2012 Egyptian parliament elections.

He was elected to the Egyptian Senate in 2021. In the senate, he was elected chairman of the committee on Education, Scientific Research, Telecommunication, and Information Technology.
