= Democratic Generation Party =

Democratic Generation Party Hizb El-Geel al-Democrati حزب الجيل الديمقراطي
- Chairman: Nagy Abdel-Fattah Al-Shehabi
- Founded: 9 February 2002
- Headquarters: Cairo
- Ideology: Liberal democracy
- National affiliation: Egyptian Front
- House of Representatives: 0 / 568

Website
- hzpelgeel.com

The Democratic Generation Party or Hizb El-Geel al-Democrati (Arabic: حزب الجيل الديمقراطي) is a political party in Egypt. The Democratic Generation Party can be considered a mainstream political party.

== Overview ==
The party was founded in 2002. It was part of the Democratic Alliance for Egypt led by the Muslim Brotherhood during the 2011-2012 Egyptian parliamentary election.

The party was one of the founding members of the Egyptian Front, which was founded in August 2014 ahead of the 2015 Egyptian parliamentary election. It planned to run on Kamal Ganzouri's National Alliance list, though Ganzouri withdrew from the race in February 2015.

== See also ==
- Liberalism in Egypt
- Contributions to liberal theory
- Liberalism worldwide
- List of liberal parties
- Liberal democracy
