= Moderate Current Coalition =

Defunct Egyptian electoral alliance

- Founded: 2012
- Ideology: Moderate Islamism; Factions: Liberal Islam; Liberalism; Secularism; Youth politics
- Political position: Centre
- Religion: Islam

The Moderate Current Coalition was an electoral alliance of Egyptian political parties, formed after the Egyptian parliamentary elections that occurred in 2011 and 2012.

== Formerly affiliated parties ==
- Wasat Party
- Egyptian Current Party
- Strong Egypt
- Civilization Party
- Justice Party
- April 6 Youth Movement
- Masrina movement
