= Democratic Union Party (Egypt) =

Democratic Unionist Party حزب الاتحاد الديمقراطي
- Chairman: Ibrahim Mohamed Tork
- Founded: April 1990
- Headquarters: Cairo
- Ideology: Secularism; Liberalism
- National affiliation: Social Justice coalition
- House of Representatives: 0 / 568

The Democratic Unionist Party (Arabic: حزب الاتحاد الديمقراطي, romanized: Hizb al-Itahadi al-democrati) is an Egyptian political party, with a membership of around 215 members. The party presses for achieving unity between Egypt and Sudan and separation between church and state.

The party nominated its head, Ibrahim Tork, to run for Egypt's first contested presidential elections.

== Platform ==
The party platform calls for:

- Guaranteeing citizens' basic freedoms and political rights.
- Achieving comprehensive economic development.
- Upgrading public utilities and services.
- Protecting Egypt's status on regional and international arenas.
