= Umma Party (Egypt) =

Political party in Egypt

Umma Party Hizb Al-Umma حزب الأمة
- Chairman: Ahmed Al-Sabahi Khalil
- Founded: 25 June 1983
- Headquarters: Cairo
- Ideology: Islamic socialism
- House of Representatives: 0 / 568

The Umma Party (Arabic: حزب الأمة, Hizb al-Umma) is a small Egyptian political party.

== History and profile ==
The party was established in 1983. It was the first party accepted by the Political Party Affairs Committee since the 1950s.

== Party principles ==
The party:

- Considers Egypt part of the Arab and Islamic world
- Calls for establishing a socialist and democratic system in Egypt
- Calls of the adoption of Islamic law as the main source of legislation
- Supports all efforts to establish peace with Israel
- Calls for building a society on the principles of labor and production

== See also ==
- List of Islamic political parties
