= Egyptian Front =

Egyptian electoral alliance

Egyptian Front الجبهة المصرية
- Founded: 17 August 2014
- Ideology: Big tent Factions: Social democracy Liberal democracy Egyptian nationalism Sufism; Secularism; Militarism; Reformism; Liberalism
- Political position: Centre
- National affiliation: Egypt
- House of Representatives: 50 / 568

The Egyptian Front (Arabic: الجبهة المصرية, romanized: al-Gabha al-Masreya) was an alliance of political parties which contested the 2015 Egyptian parliamentary election in a joint list with the Independent Current Coalition, called Egypt.

== History ==
The alliance was established on 17 August 2014 by the following parties: Congress Party, El-Ghad Party, Tagammu Party, Modern Egypt Party, My Homeland Egypt Party, Democratic Generation Party, Republican People’s Party, and the Egyptian National Movement. Former presidential candidate Hamdeen Sabahi criticized the alliance by stating that it represents "Mubarak-era politics". The alliance was described after its formation as being made up of "diehards of the former regime of Hosni Mubarak's .... National Democratic Party."

The Egyptian Front planned to coordinate with the National Alliance list that was led by Kamal Ganzouri, though the National Alliance withdrew from the race in February 2015.

The Tagammu Party, Congress Party and El-Ghad Party all withdrew from the alliance in December 2014.

A rival list, For the Love of Egypt, was established in February 2015, while the Modern Egypt Party withdrew from the coalition in May 2015.

The Egyptian Patriotic Movement and the My Homeland Egypt Party left the alliance and joined the For the Love of Egypt coalition following a failed attempt to merge the For the Love of Egypt coalition and the Egyptian Front. They left For the Love of Egypt in September and joined the Egypt alliance, which was formed between the Egyptian Front and the Independent Current Coalition.

== Electoral history ==
=== House of Representatives elections ===
Election	Seats	+/–	Result
2015			

== Affiliated parties ==
- Republican People's Party
- National Party of Egypt
- Egyptian Liberation Party
- Egyptian Patriotic Movement
- My Homeland Egypt Party
- Democratic Generation Party
- Tomorrow Party
