= National Conciliation Party (Egypt) =

National Conciliation Party حزب الوفاق Hizb Al-Wifak
- Chairman: Refaat Al-Agroudy
- Founded: 2000; 25 years ago
- Headquarters: Cairo
- Ideology: Arab nationalism
- National affiliation: Social Justice Coalition
- House of Representatives: 0 / 568

The National Conciliation Party (Arabic: حزب الوفاق الوطني; Hizb Al-Wifak) is a small Egyptian political party.

== History and profile ==
The National Conciliation Party was established in 2000. It was the second party accepted by the Political Party Affairs Committee since the 1950s.

The party presses for reaching a solution to the Palestinian issue. It also calls for achieving an Arab economic integration, establishing the common Arab market and maintaining the Arab national security. The party nominated its head, Refaat Al-Agroudy, to run for Egypt's first multi-candidate presidential elections in 2005.
