= For the Love of Egypt =

Defunct Egyptian electoral alliance

For the Love of Egypt في حب مصر Fe Hubb Masr
- Leader: Sameh Seif El-Yazal
- Founder: Ehab Saad (Mukhabarat)
- Founded: 3 and 4 February 2015
- Dissolved: 2018
- Merged into: Nation's Future Party
- Succeeded by: National List for the Sake of Egypt

For the Love of Egypt (FLE, Arabic: في حب مصر, romanized: Fe Hubb Masr), also called Out of Love of Egypt, In Egypt's Love, and For Egypt, was an electoral alliance, created by the General Intelligence Service, which contested the 2015 Egyptian parliamentary election.

== Background ==
Egyptian president Abdel Fattah el-Sisi met on 12 January 2015 with various political parties, including the Egyptian National Movement, the Conference Party and the Egyptian Social Democratic Party, and called on a unified list to be formed, though Omar Semeida, the head of the Conference Party, was skeptical of the proposed arrangement.

Many of the public figures who formed the National Alliance, which was supported by Kamal Ganzouri, chose to become part of the For the Love of Egypt list, following Ganzouri's withdrawal from the race in February 2015.

== Creation ==
The For the Love of Egypt (FLE) alliance was created with a founding meeting on 3 February 2015, chaired by General Ehab Saad of the General Intelligence Service (Mukhabarat) at the Mukhabarat headquarters. Participants were invited to the meeting by Major Ahmed Shaaban, a Military Intelligence officer close to president Abdel Fattah el-Sisi, who played a major role in organising pro-Sisi political coalitions. The main coordinator for choosing who should be a member of the list was Yaser Selim, a former Mukhabarat officer still working for the Mukhabarat as a civilian, with Sameh Seif El-Yazal having a nominal responsibility in coordinating the list. The creation of the alliance was announced in a press conference on 4 February 2015.

== 2015 election ==
In the 2015 Egyptian parliamentary election, the party submitted an electoral list contesting the 45 closed-list seats of the Upper Egypt constituency. Initially, the list however was rejected by Egypt's High Election Committee (HEC). In the final announcement, the list however was eventually admitted. In the other three constituencies, the party did not submit an electoral list.

A member of the Tagammu Party was expected to be placed on the list established by For the Love of Egypt, though his name was ultimately left off.

The Tomorrow Party left the alliance and rejoined the Egyptian Front. The Egyptian Patriotic Movement and My Homeland Egypt Party are not part of the alliance. The coalition is seen as being supportive of current president Abdel Fattah el-Sisi, although the Reform and Development Party has been skeptical about the support. 24 former members of the National Democratic Party won seats in the first phase of the 2015 election. The Reform and Development Party later became part of the Civil Democratic Movement.

== Composition ==
Party	Main ideology	Leader/s
Conservative Party	Conservatism	Akmal Kortam
Free Egyptians Party	Liberalism	Essam Khalil
New Wafd Party	National liberalism	El-Sayyid el-Badawi
Sadat Democratic Party		Effat Al Sadat
Tamarod	Secularism, Anti-corruption	
Modern Egypt Party		Nabil Dibis
Nation's Future Party		Mohamed Badran
Congress Party	Catch-all	
Reform and Renaissance Party	Islamism	

== Election results ==
Election year	# of overall votes	% of overall vote	# of overall seats won	+/–	Government
2015		(#1)	165 / 596	▲165	Majority
