= Revolutionary Guards Party =

Political party in Egypt

Revolutionary Guards Party حزب حراس الثورة
- Leader: Magdy el-Sharif
- House of Representatives: 0 / 568

Website
- http://www.horaselthawra.com/

The Revolutionary Guards Party (Arabic: حزب حراس الثورة) is a political party in Egypt.

== History ==
The party ran in the 2015 Egyptian parliamentary election and held one seat in the Egyptian People's Assembly.

== Electoral history ==
=== People's Assembly elections ===
Election	Seats	+/–
2015	1 / 596	▲1
