= Sameh Seif El-Yazal =

Egyptian military officer and politician

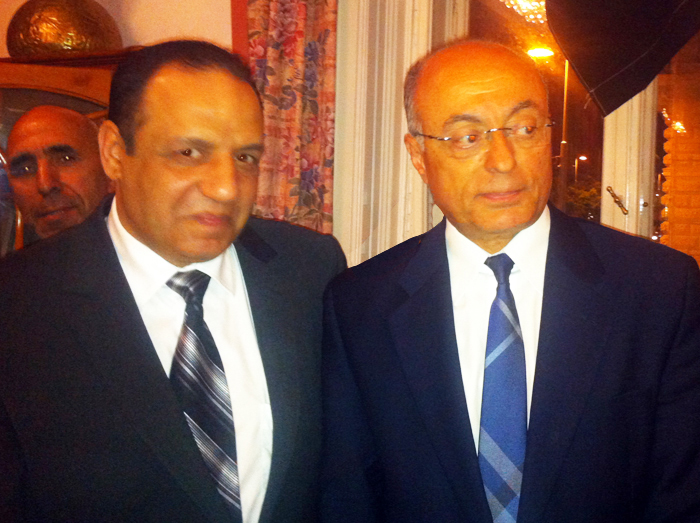
Major General Sameh Seif El-Yazal with Ayman Wahdan, 2012.

Sameh Seif El-Yazal (1946 – 4 April 2016) was an Egyptian military officer and politician. He was elected to the Egyptian House of Representatives in 2015.

== Career ==
El-Yazal fought in several wars including "the Six-Day War, the War of Attrition and the 6 October War". He was an officer in Egypt's Republican Guard, Military Intelligence and the General Intelligence Service.

El-Yazal was a frequent guest on media talk shows as a national security expert where he analysed issues, including during the rule of the Supreme Council of the Armed Forces following the overthrow of Hosni Mubarak in 2011, as well as following the "ouster" of former president Mohamed Morsi in 2013. He became the coordinator of an electoral alliance, called For the Love of Egypt, which was reportedly backed by the state. El-Yazal denied this allegation but after the coalition's victory in the parliamentary election in which it won 120 seats, El-Yazal publicly declared that the For the Love of Egypt coalition would be an arm of president Abdel Fattah el-Sisi in the parliament. He won his own election to the House of Representatives and became the leader of the majority bloc in parliament, which was known as Egypt's Support coalition, until his death on 4 April 2016 from cancer.
