= 2015 Egyptian parliamentary election =

- 17 October – 2 December 2015

568 of the 596 seats in the House of Representatives 299 seats needed for a majority
- Turnout: 28.27%

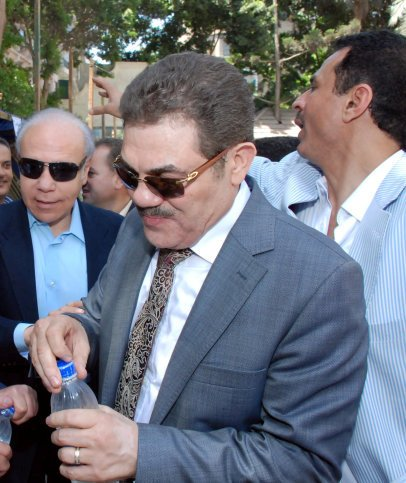

	First party	Second party	Third party
Leader	Essam Khalil	Mohamed Badran	El-Sayyid el-Badawi
Party	Free Egyptians	Nation's Future	New Wafd
Alliance	FLE	FLE	FLE
Last election	15	–	38
Seats won	65	53	36
Seat change	▲50	New	▼2
	Fourth party	Fifth party	Sixth party
Leader	Galal Haridy	Hazem Omar	Omar El-Mokhtar Semeida
Party	Homeland Defenders	Republican People's	Congress
Alliance		Egyptian Front	FLE
Last election	–	–	–
Seats won	18	13	12
Seat change	New	New	New
Speaker of the House before election
Vacant
Elected Speaker of the House
Ali Abdel Aal
Egypt's Support coalition

Parliamentary elections were held in Egypt in two phases from 17 October to 2 December 2015 to elect members of the House of Representatives. The elected parliament reviewed laws that were passed while a parliament was not in session.

In preparation for the election, security was tightened across the country with at least 185,000 troops supporting police, President Abdel Fattah el-Sisi made a televised appeal for Egyptians to vote, and in mid-October, public sector employees were given half a day's holiday to encourage them to take part. The strikingly low turnout, in some areas close to only 10%, with "many angry at the government and its policies", was widely regarded as a set-back for the administration and a success for calls to boycotts from oppositional movements.

Despite the low turnout, the election resulted in a majority for pro-Sisi forces: independents won 325 of the 596 seats, many of whom were aligned with the president. The For the Love of Egypt alliance, a pro-Sisi coalition, secured all 120 party-list seats, while the Free Egyptians Party became the largest party with 65 seats.

== Background ==
The Moderate Current Coalition, which was formed in 2012, and included the Al-Wasat Party, Egyptian Current Party, Strong Egypt Party, Civilization Party, Justice Party, the April 6 Youth Movement and Masrina planned to participate in the upcoming election at the time. The following year, the Centrist Coalition was formed in January 2013 and included the Al-Wasat Party, Ghad El-Thawra Party, the Civilization Party, the Virtue Party, the Reform and Renaissance Party, Authenticity Party, the Egyptian Current Party, and the Al-Sarh Al-Masry Party.

Other electoral alliances included the Islamist Free Nation Coalition, which included the Building and Development Party, affiliated with Al-Jama'a al-Islamiyya, the Authenticity Party, the Homeland Party, which had separated from the Al-Nour Party, and the Flag Party, established by Salafist preacher Hazem Salah Abu Ismail.

Other Islamist alliances that were established included the Islamist Coalition, which was formed in February 2013 and included the Islamic Party, the Building and Development Party, the Egyptian Nation Party, People Party and the Hazemon movement and the Nation Alliance, which formed the following month, included the Flag Party, the Egyptian Reform Party, Authenticity Party, the People Party, the Islamic Party, Virtue Party and New Labour Party.

They were expected to participate in parliamentary elections that would have been held by the Mohamed Morsi government in April 2013, but they were delayed in March 2013 after a ruling by the Supreme Administrative Court, though Morsi was overthrown in a July 2013 coup d'etat.

== Electoral system ==
Interim president Adly Mansour passed an electoral law in June 2014, shortly before the end of his term. The law, which was created by committee, set aside 80% of the seats for individual candidates and 20% of the seats for party lists; the composition was criticized by the New Wafd Party, the Al-Nour Party and the Egyptian Social Democratic Party. Abdel Ghafar Shokr, the head of the Socialist Popular Alliance Party, called the electoral law a "setback" for democracy in Egypt. Unlike the previous election, the party lists were not elected by proportional representation, but by an absolute majority, with a run off if no candidates wins 50% of the vote.

The election was expected to begin on 21 March. However, the Supreme Constitutional Court ruled on 1 March that the "Elections Constituency Division Law" was invalidated. The new president, Abdel Fattah el-Sisi, ratified an electoral law in July. The Civil Democratic Current called for an increase in the number of party list seats, from 120 to 180. The Civil Democratic Current, the Egyptian Wafd Alliance and the Al-Nour Party called for an increase in party seats when they met Sisi in November, while the Egyptian Front was opposed to the changes.

The parliament is made up of 596 seats, with 448 seats elected through the single member districts, 120 elected through party bloc vote in which party list should win 50%+ votes to win all seats however if no list achieved the threshold, a second round held between top two parties and the list with the most votes wins. Party list contain quotas for youth, women, Christians, and workers. Single member districts consists of 1-member district, 2-member districts, 3-member district and 4-member districts (candidates number should be the double of contested seat number). In addition, 28 are selected by the president. The government commission that set the rules for the 2015 parliamentary elections "drastically reduced the number of list seats".

== Procedure ==
=== First phase: Upper Egypt & West Delta ===
In the first phase, elections were held from 17 to 28 October 2015 in the fourteen governorates of the Upper Egypt and West Delta regions, namely the governorates of Giza, Fayoum, Beni Suef, Minya, Asyut, New Valley, Sohag, Qena, Luxor, Aswan, Red Sea, Alexandria, Beheira, and Matruh.

For these governorates, the first round of elections took place on 18 to 19 October for Egyptian residents, while it took place on 17 to 18 October for Egyptian expatriates. Runoffs were held on 27 to 28 October for Egyptians residents, and on 26 to 27 October for Egyptian expatriates.

Nominations started on 1 September, and lasted until 12 September (with the exception of the Qena and Qoss districts, which were extended until 15 September), though candidates had until 15 September to submit the necessary medical tests. Campaigning for the first phase started on 29 September and ended on 15 October.

=== Second phase: Central and East Delta ===
In the second phase, elections took place from 21 November to 2 December 2015 in the remaining nine governorates of the Central Delta and East Delta regions, namely the governorates of Cairo, Qalyubia, Dakahlia, Monufia, Gharbia, Kafr el-Sheikh, Sharqia, Damietta, Port Said, Ismailia, Suez, North Sinai, and South Sinai.

For these governorates, the first round of elections took place on 22 to 23 November for Egyptian residents and 21 to 22 November for Egyptian expatriates. Runoffs were held on 1 to 2 December for Egyptian residents, and on 30 November to 1 December for Egyptian expatriates.

Campaigning started on 2 November and ended on 20 November 2015.

== Parties ==
=== Withdrawn ===
Amr Moussa announced in June 2014 that he was preparing a new alliance. Several days later, the Egyptian Social Democratic Party and Reform and Development Party announced that they would align with the New Wafd Party and that all three parties had left discussions with Moussa regarding the proposed alliance. Murad Muwafi also withdrew from Moussa's alliance. The Free Egyptians Party announced that it planned to run independently. The Congress Party, New Wafd Party, the Tagammu Party, the Egyptian Social Democratic Party, the Reform and Development Party, the Democratic Generation Party and the Conservative Party had joined the alliance, by then known as the Alliance of the Egyptian Nation, by the following month. Moussa withdrew from the alliance in August, with the July withdrawal of the Wafd Party from the alliance marking a turning point.

The exit of Moussa's alliance led to the formation in August of two alliances; the Egyptian Front was composed of those that were close to the Mubarak regime, including the Congress Party, My Homeland Egypt Party, Egyptian National Movement, Modern Egypt Party, and the El-Ghad Party. The Wafd Party, the Egyptian Social Democratic Party, the Reform and Development Party, the Conservative Party and the Awareness Party created the Egyptian Wafd Alliance.

The Conference Party, El-Ghad Party, Tagammu Party and the Wafd Party formed an alliance in February 2015, ahead of anticipated elections the following month. Amr Al Shobaki formed a new alliance, called Construction, that same month.

The National Alliance had formed with the support of former prime minister Kamal Ganzouri, but the alliance withdrew from the election in February 2015. Another list, called the Reawakening of Egypt, withdrew from the race in September.

=== Contesting ===
On 16 September, the High Elections Committee announced the initial list of accepted candidates. While nine electoral lists were accepted, five more lists were rejected, including two of the three lists of the Egypt coalition (Egyptian Front & Independent Current Coalition) as well as the lists of Upper Egypt's Voice, Call of Egypt and Knights of Egypt. After appealing to court, all rejected lists but the one by Upper Egypt's Voice were admitted. The final list of candidates for the first phase was announced on 28 September.

A total of seven electoral lists contested the 120 fixed-list seats available in the four regional constituencies:

Accepted electoral lists
Name of the list	1st phase constituency		2nd phase constituency	
Name of the list	North, Center & South Upper Egypt Division Constituency (45 seats)	West Delta Division Constituency (15 seats)	Cairo, South & Center Delta Division Constituency (45 seats)	East Delta Division Constituency (15 seats)
For the Love of Egypt (Fi Hob Misr)	Yes	Yes	Yes	Yes
Egypt coalition	Yes	Yes	Yes	No
Al-Nour Party	No	Yes	Yes	No
Call of Egypt (Nidaa Misr)	Yes	No	No	No
Independent National Reawakening Bloc (al-Sahwa al-Wataneya)	Yes	No	No	No
Knights of Egypt (Forsan Misr)	No	Yes	No	No
Republican Alliance for Social Forces	No	No	Yes	No
Source: Mada Masr

In the first phase, 2,573 individual candidates contested in 226 individual seats. Many parties are fielding individual candidates both on joint electoral lists and contesting the list-based seats.

=== Boycotts ===
A number of parties boycotted the election, claiming that the process was unfair. These included the following:

- Bread and Freedom Party
- Building and Development Party
- Civil Democratic Current (withdrew from the election for lack of funds)
- Constitution Party
- Freedom Egypt Party
- Homeland Party
- National Conciliation Party (withdrew from the election)
- Reawakening of Egypt (will not participate in the election)
- Revolutionary Socialists
- Social Justice Coalition (chose not to participate in the election)
- Strong Egypt Party
- Al-Wasat Party

The Supreme Electoral Commission established guidelines for media to follow, which emphasized objectivity.

== Results ==
According to unofficial results following the first round, former members of the National Democratic Party and the Al-Nour Party performed the weakest.

The only parties that won more than 10 seats in the election, other than the For the Love of Egypt alliance, were the Republican People's Party, the Al-Nour Party, and Homeland Defenders Party.

The three parties, in addition to the Free Egyptians Party, had the highest number of candidates reaching the runoffs.

Party	Seats		
Party	FPTP	List	Total
Free Egyptians Party	57	8	65
Nation's Future Party	43	10	53
New Wafd Party	27	8	35
Homeland Defenders Party	10	8	18
Republican People's Party	13	0	13
Congress Party	8	4	12
Al-Nour Party	11	0	11
Conservative Party	1	5	6
Democratic Peace Party	5	0	5
Egyptian Social Democratic Party	4	0	4
Egyptian Patriotic Movement	4	0	4
Modern Egypt Party	4	0	4
Freedom Party	3	0	3
Reform and Development Party	3	0	3
My Homeland Egypt Party	3	0	3
Revolutionary Guards Party	1	0	1
National Progressive Unionist Rally Party	1	0	1
Free Egyptian Building Party	1	0	1
Arab Democratic Nasserist Party	1	0	1
Independents	251	74	325
Appointed members	–	–	28
Total	451	117	596
Source: Mada Masr

=== First phase ===
Party	Ideology	Candidates	Run-off candidates	% Reaching runoff	Votes	Seats
Free Egyptians Party	Liberalism	111	64	56.63	1,009,083	41
Nation's Future Party	Populism	89	64	51.68	702,965	26
Al-Nour Party	Salafi Islamist	91	23	25.27	494,042	8
New Wafd Party	National liberalism	77	21	27.27	392,138	16
Republican People's Party	Populism	42	14	33.33	198,822	11
Democratic Peace Party	Nationalism	57	8	14.03	155,847	1
Congress Party	National liberalism	53	7	13.20	105,975	5
Homeland Defenders Party	Populism	51	5	9.80	89,875	7
Freedom Party	Liberalism	6	3	50.00	68,926	1
Egyptian Social Democratic Party	Social liberalism	41	5	12.19	56,922	3
Egyptian Patriotic Movement	Secularism	60	4	6.66	45,014	1
My Homeland Egypt Party	Populism	20	3	15.00	29,971	1
Modern Egypt Party	Liberalism	25	2	8.00	25,993	2
Conservative	Conservatism	14	1	4.28	23,042	1
Free Egyptian Building Party		11	1	9.09		1
Leader Party		9	1	11.11		0
Other/Independents	----					
Total						

=== Expatriates ===
The results for expatriate voting during the first phase were announced on 20 October 2015.

Results for expatriate voting during the first round
Coalitions	Votes
For the Love of Egypt	15,529
Call of Egypt	3,076
Egypt	2,969
Independent National Reawakening Bloc	1,403
