= Arab Democratic Nasserist Party =

Arab Democratic Nasserist Party الحزب العربى الديمقراطى الناصرى
- Chairman: Sameh Ashour
- Founded: 1984; 42 years ago 19 April 1992
- Newspaper: Al Arabi
- Ideology: Arab nationalism Arab socialism Pan-Arabism; Nasserism
- National affiliation: National Front Alliance
- House of Representatives: 0 / 568

The Arab Democratic Nasserist Party (Arabic: الحزب العربي الديمقراطي الناصري, romanized: al-Hizb al-'Arabi al-Dimuqrati al-Nasseri) is a Nasserist political party in Egypt, styling itself as the ideological successor of the old Arab Socialist Union party of Egypt's second president, Gamal Abdel Nasser.

Al Arabi, a weekly newspaper, is the organ of the party.

== History ==
The economic liberalizations, and foreign policy changes implemented by Nasser's successor as president, Anwar El Sadat, alienated many ideological Nasserists in the late 1970s and early 1980s. One illegal group, the Thawrat Misri, or Egyptian Revolution was formed in 1980. After it was broken up by the government, several of Nasser's relatives were shown to be involved.

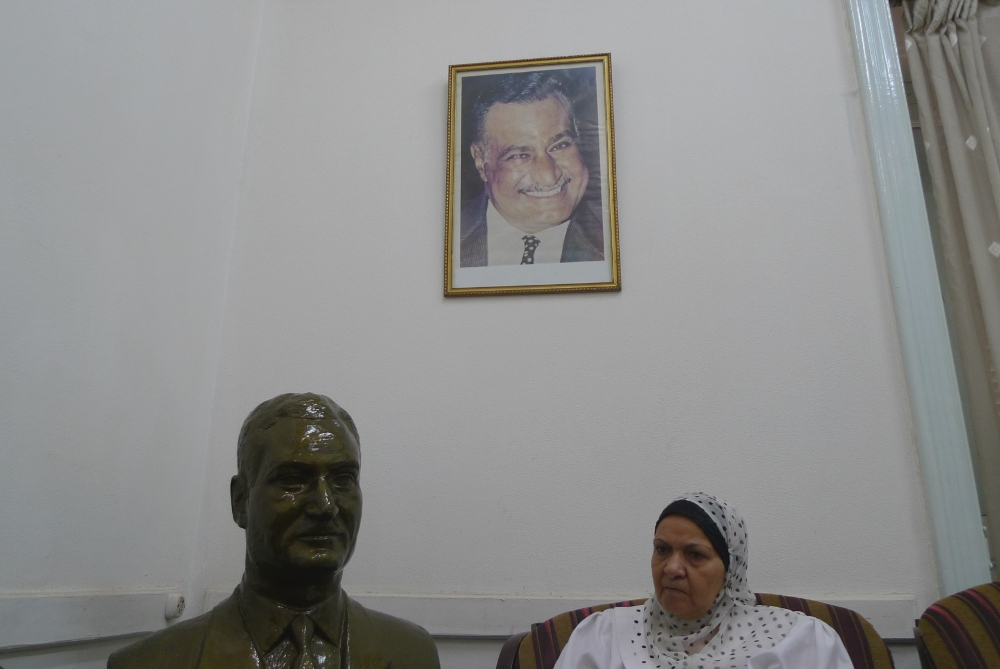
MP Sowad Abdelhamid sits near icons of former Egyptian president and famous Arab nationalist Gamel Abdel Nasser in the headquarters of the Nasserist Party.

Ideological Nasserists gravitated to either the Socialist Labor Party or the National Progressive Unionist Party (NPUF) throughout the rest of the decade. They were finally allowed to have an open legal party, the Arab Democratic Nasserist Party, led by Diaa al-Din Dawoud, on 19 April 1992.

At the 2000 parliamentary elections, the party won three out of 454 seats. However, at the 2005 and 2010 elections, the party failed to win any seats. At the 2015 election, the party won one seat.

Dawoud died in April 2011, with Sameh Ashour elected the same month to succeed him.

The party planned to compete in the 2011–12 Egyptian parliamentary election as part of the Democratic Alliance for Egypt, but broke away.

== Platform ==
The party platform calls for:

- Social change towards progress and development.
- Defence and freedom of national will.
- Renouncing violence and combating terrorism.
- Protecting public freedoms.
- Enhancing the role of the public sector.
- Modernizing the Egyptian industries.
- Developing the agriculture sector.
- Encouraging inter-Arab economic integration.
- Providing free-of-charge medical treatment for citizens.
- Promoting peace in the world arena.

== Electoral history ==
=== People's Assembly elections ===
Election	Seats	+/–
2011–12	1 / 596	▲1
