= My Homeland Egypt Party =

My Homeland Egypt Party مصر بلدي Misr Baladi
- Leader: Qadry Abu Hussein; Ahmed Gamal El Din (formerly)
- Founded: December 2013
- National affiliation: Egyptian Front
- House of Representatives: 0 / 568

The My Homeland Egypt Party is an Egyptian political party composed of "diehards" from the Hosni Mubarak-era National Democratic Party.

== Overview ==
The party, an independent popular movement, was formed in December 2013. Although Murad Muwafi was considered for the presidency of the party, Ahmed Gamal El Din was ultimately selected. The organization behind the party, called the Misr Baladi Front, supported Abdel Fattah el-Sisi in the 2014 presidential race. Mostafa Bakry, a party member, stated in July 2014 that the organization was preparing its lists for the 2015 Egyptian parliamentary election. The party was one of the founding members of the Egyptian Front, which was launched in August 2014. The party won three seats in the election.

== Electoral history ==
=== House of Representatives elections ===
Election	Votes	%	Seats	+/–
2015			3 / 596	▲3
