= Egyptian National Movement =

Political party in Egypt

Egyptian National Movement الحركة الوطنية المصرية
- President: Raouf El-Sayed Ali
- Secretary-General: Abdel Rehim Ali
- Founder: Ahmed Shafik; Mohamed Abu Hamed
- Founded: 2 December 2012
- Headquarters: Cairo
- Ideology: Secularism; Reformism
- Political position: Centre
- National affiliation: Egyptian Front; National Unified List for Egypt (2020)
- Colors: Blue (customary)
- Slogan: Actions... Not words. أفعال... لا أقوال
- Senate: 0 / 568

Website
- http://enmparty.org/

The Egyptian National Movement, or Egyptian Patriotic Movement (Arabic: الحركة الوطنية المصرية) is a political party initiated by former presidential candidate Ahmed Shafik and Mohamed Abu Hamed, former vice chairman of the Free Egyptians Party and founder of the Life of the Egyptians Party.

== Overview ==
Abdel Rehim Aly, the secretary general of the party, has stated that the group would unite with any party that isn't aligned with the Muslim Brotherhood. Shafik stated on 8 April 2013 that he was open to an alliance with the National Salvation Front (NSF); George Ishaq, a co-founder of the NSF, has stated that Shafik was "not welcome" in the coalition. The supreme committee of the Egyptian National Movement accused the NSF of "enormous political naiveté" and pointed out that many current members of the NSF were also part of the Mubarak regime. The political program is set out on their website.

The spokesperson for the party, Mahmoud Nafady, previously served as the spokesperson for the People's Representatives Coalition, an alliance of former NDP members who sought to run in the 2011–12 Egyptian parliamentary election.

The party was one of the founding members of the Egyptian Front, which was established in August 2014.

The party's deputy chair, Yahia Qadri, resigned from the party after negotiations failed in September 2015 for a unified list between it and For the Love of Egypt ahead of the 2015 Egyptian parliamentary election.

The Egyptian National Movement has recently been supportive of president Abdel Fattah el-Sisi. On 13 December 2017, three of its members were arrested for allegedly harming national security by spreading false information.

It allied with the National Unified List for Egypt ahead of the 2020 Egyptian Senate election.

== Platform ==
The party platform calls for:

- Political and economic reform.
- Preserving the civilian nature of the society and state.
- The right to establish groups and unions.
- Achieving social justice.
- Advocating democracy within state affairs.

== Electoral history ==
=== House of Representatives elections ===
Election	Party leader	Seats	+/–
2015	Raouf El-Sayed Ali	4 / 596	▲4
2020	Raouf El-Sayed Ali	0 / 596	▼4

=== Senate elections ===
Election	Party leader	Seats	+/–
2020	Raouf El-Sayed Ali	2 / 300	▲2
