= Justice Party (Egypt) =

Political party in Egypt

Justice Party حزب العدل Ḥizb el-Adl
- President: Abdel-Moneim Imam
- Chairperson: Youssef Hamada Youssef
- First Secretary: Omar Azziz
- Founded: 2011
- Headquarters: Garden City, Cairo
- Ideology: Big tent
- Political position: Centre
- National affiliation: Civil Democratic Movement (2017-2026); Democratic Path Alliance; National Unified List for Egypt (since 2020)
- International affiliation: Liberal International
- Colours: Red, White and Black
- House of Representatives: 11 / 596
- Senate: 4 / 300

Website
- eladlparty.com

The Justice Party (Arabic: حزب العدل, romanized: Ḥizb el-Adl) is a political party in Egypt. It was founded after the Egyptian Revolution of 2011 by a group of people from different movements that led to the revolution including the April 6 Youth Movement, the National Association for Change and Kefaya.

== History ==
After the 2011 Egyptian revolution, a group of youth taking part in the revolution announced they would be founding their own party. In May 2011, the party was officially founded after gathering 5,000 signatures from all across Egypt. Its foundation was celebrated with the first party conference being held in Al-Azhar Park. It supports centrism and secularism.

The founding committee for the Justice Party included democracy activists such as Mostafa el-Naggar, Ahmed Shoukry, Abdel-Moneim Imam, Dalia Ziada, in addition to Hisham Akram and Mohamed Gabr. The party had a group of consultants which included Egyptian economist Mona ElBaradei, sister of presidential candidate Mohamed ElBaradei, Egyptian political scientist Amr el-Shobaky, as well as Abdelgelil Mostafa, the general coordinator of Egyptian Movement for Change, also known as Kefaya, and Egyptian poet and activist Abdul Rahman Yusuf, son of Islamic theologian Yusuf al-Qaradawi.

The party fielded candidates for about a third of Egyptian parliamentary seats during the 2011-2012 parliamentary elections that started in November 2011.

The party joined the Civil Democratic Movement in 2017.

The Justice Party joined the National Unified List for Egypt ahead of the 2020 Egyptian parliamentary election.

The Justice Party became part of the Democratic Path Alliance (DPA), which it established in May 2025 alongside the Egyptian Social Democratic Party and the Reform and Development Party. The DPA began negotiating joining the National Unified List for Egypt ahead of the 2025 Egyptian Senate election, which was completed by October, ahead of the 2025 Egyptian parliamentary election. The party gained 11 seats in the election.

The party announced in early June 2026 that it had left the Civil Democratic Movement, after it had previously suspended its involvement.

== Political ideology ==
The Justice Party welcomes people from different political ideologies on the political right and left, and described itself as a party of political programs rather than a certain political ideology.

== Electoral history ==
=== People's Assembly elections ===
Election	Seats	+/–
2011/2012	1 / 596	▲1

=== House of Representatives elections ===
Election	Seats	+/–
2015	0 / 596	n/a
2020	2 / 596	▲2
2025	11 / 596	▲9

=== Senate elections ===
Election	Seats	+/–
2020	0 / 300	n/a
2025	4 / 300	▲4
