= Democratic Peace Party =

Democratic Peace Party حزب السلام الديمقراطي
- Chairman: Ahmed Fadaly
- Founded: 4 July 2005
- Headquarters: Cairo
- Ideology: Islamic democracy Liberal democracy Civic nationalism
- National affiliation: Independent Current Coalition
- House of Representatives: 0 / 596

The Democratic Peace Party (Arabic: حزب السلام الديمقراطي) is a small Egyptian political party that was formed in 2005. According to its chairman on Al-Faraeen TV (Parliament and parties program) he stated that there are about one million members in the party. The party has been described as a party that is "secular leaning but embraces an Islamic identity." The party presses for establishing peace in the region and worldwide. The party has been considered a remnant of the formerly ruling National Democratic Party.

== Platform ==
The party platform calls for:

- Establishing democracy.
- Solving problems of the citizens.
- Boosting Egypt's status on the regional and international arenas.
- Uprooting illiteracy.
- Ensuring women's rights.

== Electoral history ==
=== House of Representatives elections ===
Election	Votes	%	Seats	+/–
2011–12			1 / 596	▲1
2015			5 / 596	▲4

=== Shura Council elections ===
Election	Seats	+/–
2012	1 / 270	▲1
