= Post-coup unrest in Egypt (2013–2014) =

- Part of the Egyptian crisis
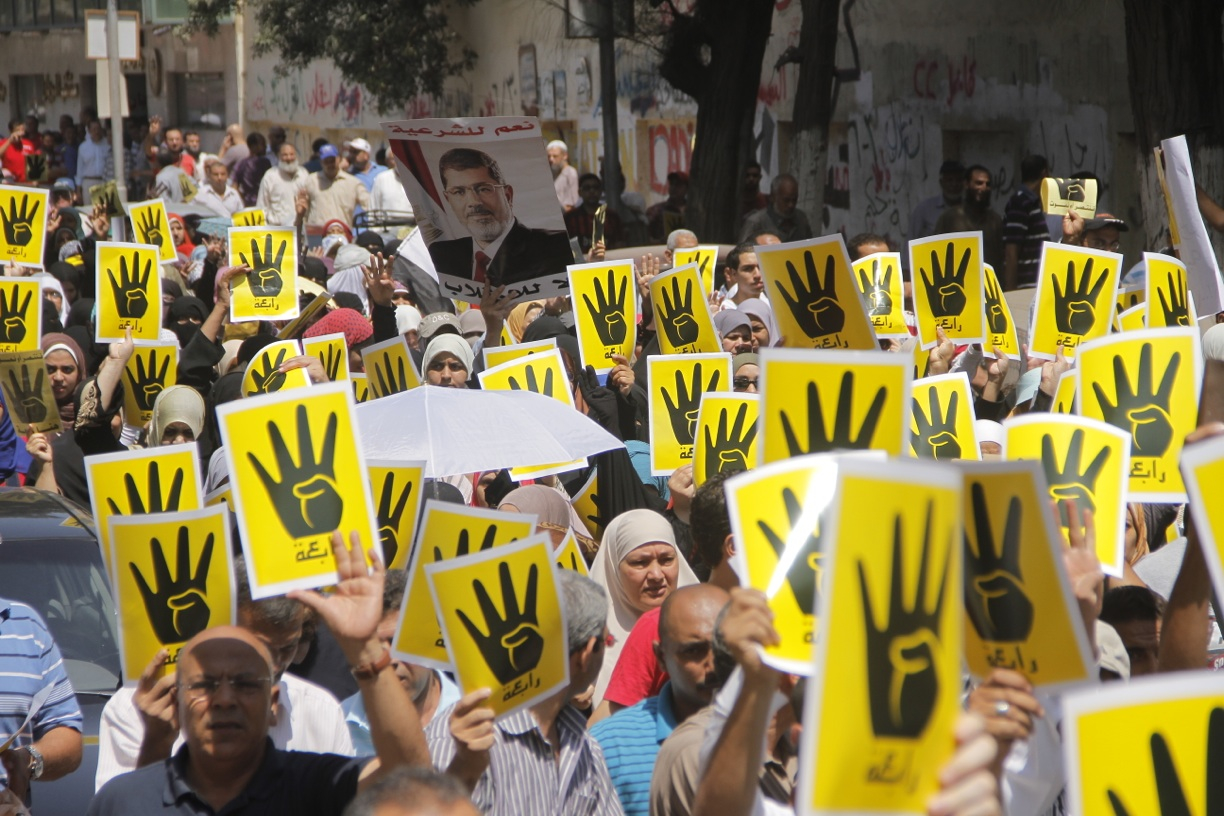
- Demonstrators holding the Rabia sign in solidarity with the victims of the 14 August massacre of pro-Morsi sit-ins in Cairo.
- Date: 3 July 2013 – 8 June 2014 (11 months and 5 days)
- Location: Egypt
- Caused by: Coup d'état; police and army actions against supporters of Mohamed Morsi
- Status: Quelled
- Result: Constitution suspended.; Interim President Adly Mansour sworn in.; Muslim Brotherhood and Salafist figures arrested.; Closure of perceived pro-Muslim Brotherhood media outlets.; Clashes continue between military and supporters of deposed President Mohamed Morsi; hundreds are killed on 14 August 2013.; Upsurge in militant violence across Egypt; Sinai insurgency intensifies.; Muslim Brotherhood is labelled as a terrorist organization.; Abdel Fattah el-Sisi is elected President of Egypt in June 2014.; Continued minor protests.

Parties
Government: Military; Police; CSF	Muslim Brotherhood: FJP; Anti-Coup Alliance; Al-Gama'a al-Islamiyya; Other Islamists

Lead figures
(Egypt) Abdel Fatah al-Sisi (Minister of Defense, Commander-in-Chief) (Egypt) Adly Mansour (Interim President, Chief Justice) (Egypt) Mohamed ElBaradei (Interim Vice President) (resigned)	Mohammed Badie (Supreme Guide of the Muslim Brotherhood); Saad El-Katatni (Chairman of the FJP): Mohamed Morsi (Former President)

Casualties and losses
500+ killed (as of March 2014)	2,600+ civilians killed(as of April 2014)
- Total: Killed ≈3,143 in various acts of political violence.

Protests against the 2013 Egyptian coup d'état erupted in July 2013. Immediately following the removal of President Mohamed Morsi by the Egyptian Armed Forces on 3 July 2013 amid demonstrations against Morsi's rule, many protesters amassed near the Rabia Al-Adawiya Mosque to call for Morsi's return to power and condemn the military, while others demonstrated in support of the military and interim government. Deadly clashes such as Rabaa massacre continued for several days, with three particularly bloody incidents being described by Muslim Brotherhood officials as "massacres" perpetrated by security forces. During the month of Ramadan (10 July – 7 August), prime minister Hazem al-Beblawy threatened to disperse the ongoing Pro-Morsi sit-ins in Rabaa al-Adaweya square and al-Nahda square. The government crackdown of these protests occurred in a violent dispersal on 14 August 2013. In mid-August, the violence directed by the army towards the protesters escalated, with hundreds killed, and the government declaring a month-long nighttime curfew.

== Background ==
=== Egypt in transition ===
Protests against President Hosni Mubarak in early 2011 led to his resignation and trial after the Egyptian military switched its allegiance to the demonstrators. Mubarak's downfall was only the second revolution in the Arab world of the revolutionary wave known as the Arab Spring.

Vice President Omar Suleiman, who announced Mubarak's resignation in February 2011, handed power to the Supreme Council of the Armed Forces. Egypt came under martial law as top generals led by Mohamed Hussein Tantawi began directing Egypt toward democratic elections. This period was marked by further conflict and continuing protests, as demonstrators who had cheered the support of the military in removing Mubarak turned against the generals when they began imposing harsh security measures and tamping down on revolutionary activity. The Muslim Brotherhood emerged as a leading voice in criticizing military rule.

An Islamist-dominated parliament was elected in late 2011 and early 2012. The Supreme Council of the Armed Forces dissolved the body in June 2012, saying many of the elections were illegitimate.

=== Morsi administration ===
Presidential elections were held in mid-2012. No candidate garnered as much as a quarter of the vote in the first round of elections. The top two candidates advanced to the runoff: Mohamed Morsi of the Freedom and Justice Party, the candidate of the Muslim Brotherhood, and Ahmed Shafik, an independent candidate who served as prime minister of Egypt under Mubarak. Morsi strongly criticized the Mubarak regime and offered a vision for Egypt as an Islamic democracy, while Shafik, a secularist, promised to restore order. Morsi ultimately prevailed in the runoff, defeating Shafik by a margin of 3.5 percentage points. While Islamists hailed Morsi's election with enthusiasm, many Copts and liberals viewed the runoff as a choice between two unappealing candidates.

Morsi reinstated parliament days after his election, and lawmakers set to work drafting a constitution. The constitution was passed over the objections of opposition members who argued the process was faulty. When put to a referendum in December 2012, the constitution was approved by a nearly 28-point margin, as supporters successfully argued that approval of the constitution was needed to ensure stability.

However, Morsi's government faced popular protests after the president decreed in November 2012 that he had vast powers that could not be checked by the courts. Protesters called for Morsi to withdraw his constitutional declaration or resign from office. Within weeks, Morsi annulled the declaration, days before the constitution itself was approved by voters.

=== Coup d'état ===
Protests against Morsi continued throughout the first half of 2013, whipping up in June 2013 briefly after the president appointed an Islamist accused of involvement in the Luxor massacre to head the Luxor Governorate and culminating in mass demonstrations that began on 30 June. Protesters criticized Morsi for alleged mismanagement of the country and for the growing influence of the Muslim Brotherhood. The Tamarod movement, which translates into English as "Rebel", claimed it had gathered 22 million signatures from Egyptians opposed to Morsi. According to some sources, the protests were the largest in Egypt's history.

The Egyptian Armed Forces again sided with demonstrators against the regime, warning Morsi to respond to protesters' demands or face a "political road map" widely expected to involve the president's removal from office. Despite this, Morsi remained defiant, giving a speech on 2 July insisting he was the legitimate president and would sooner die than relinquish power. The next day, Defence Minister Abdul Fatah al-Sisi informed Morsi that he was no longer president and addressed the country on television to announce the change in leadership.

== Formation of new government ==
Indications on 6 July 2013 that Mohamed ElBaradei would be sworn in as prime minister proved to be incorrect. The next day, a founding member of the Egyptian Social Democratic Party named Ziad Bahaa El-Din was reportedly offered the post of Prime Minister, while ElBaradei was nominated as vice president. Yunis Makhyun, chairman of the Nour Party, objected to both appointments because both of them belong to the same political coalition (the National Salvation Front); he called for nominees who were "politically neutral" instead. The Nour Party rejected El-Din on 7 July 2013 and pulled out of the transitional process altogether on 8 July 2013 because of the 2013 Republican Guard Headquarters clashes. However, the party has advised the interim government on ministerial candidates, including Ahmed Darwish. Hazem Al Beblawi was sworn in as prime minister on 9 July 2013 with the backing of the Nour Party.

== Chronology ==
=== Prelude ===
==== 3 July military coup ====
On 3 July, General Abdel Fattah el-Sisi, head of the Egyptian Armed Forces, announced that he there would be calling new presidential and Shura Council elections. The coalition appointed Chief Justice Adly Mansour as the interim president and charged him with forming a transitional technocratic government. Military vehicles drove throughout Cairo. Morsi was put under house arrest, and was believed to be at the Republican Guard barracks. According to other sources he was taken to a military base and his travel was restricted. Army troops and tanks were reported to have surrounded key facilities and installations. At noon, the Republican Guard, who had Morsi in their care, left his side to allow Army commandos to take him to an undisclosed Ministry of Defence building. He offered no resistance.

General al-Sisi said: "The president's speech last night failed to meet and conform with the demands [of the people, prompting the armed forces to consult] with some of the symbols of the national forces and the youths without excluding anyone. [They agreed on a road map] that includes initial steps that realize the building of a strong and coherent Egyptian society that does not exclude any of its sons and currents and that end the state of conflict and division." He added the army was standing apart from the political process but was using its vision as the Egyptian people were calling for help and discharged its responsibility. Al-Sisi named former Chief Justice Adli Mansour as the interim president and added that he would be sworn in on 4 July. The Shura Council was also dissolved. Morsi condemned his removal as a "full coup" by the general. He also urged everyone to "adhere to peacefulness and avoid shedding blood of fellow countrymen." The Office of Assistant to President of Egypt on Foreign Relations called Morsi's removal a "military coup", and said "there is no democracy without the ballot box".

The announcement of the removal of Morsi was met with cheers in Tahrir Square. Anti-Morsi protesters shouted "Allahu akbar" and "Long live Egypt" and launched fireworks as green laser lights held by those in the crowd lit the sky. Mohamed el-Baradei says the coup was to rectify the issues of the revolution. The Coptic Pope Tawadros II, Grand Imam of al-Azhar Ahmed el-Tayeb, Mohamed ElBaradei and some of the youth leaders of Tamarod, Mahmoud Badr and Mohamed Abdelaziz, spoke in support of the military intervention. The al-Nour party also commented in saying that the events occurred as they were not heard in their call for dialogue. Party Secretary-General Galal Murra commented that: "we took this position (on agreeing to the army political road map) and we took these decisions only so we stop the bloodshed of our people." Pro-Morsi protesters heard a statement from Morsi, which was published on his Facebook page. He called the move a "coup" and rejected the Armed Forces' statement.

The Freedom and Justice Party's Gamal Heshmat said: "There is absolutely no direction towards violence. The Brotherhood are not raised on violence. Their cause is a peaceful one, defending their rights, which is stronger than a "military coup". The army has perpetrated a "shameful coup". We are still in the street, we still don't know if all of the armed forces will accept what Sisi has done." A party spokesman said that what started as a military coup was "turning into something much more." The National Salvation Front, an alliance of multiple political parties, stated on 4 July that "what Egypt is witnessing now is not a military coup by any standards. It was a necessary decision that the Armed Forces' leadership took to protect democracy, maintain the country's unity and integrity, restore stability and get back on track towards achieving the goals of the January 25 Revolution."

==== 4 July ====
Adly Mansour, Chief Justice of the Supreme Constitutional Court of Egypt, was sworn in as interim president. Mansour gave a speech in which he praised demonstrators for toppling the government, saying, "I offer my greetings to the revolutionary people of Egypt."

Violence continued with over 100 people wounded and at least two deaths, believed to be that of children. The Muslim Brotherhood's spokesman called for "strictly peaceful" protests to defy (according to his description) the military coup.

==== 5 July: "Friday of Rejection" ====
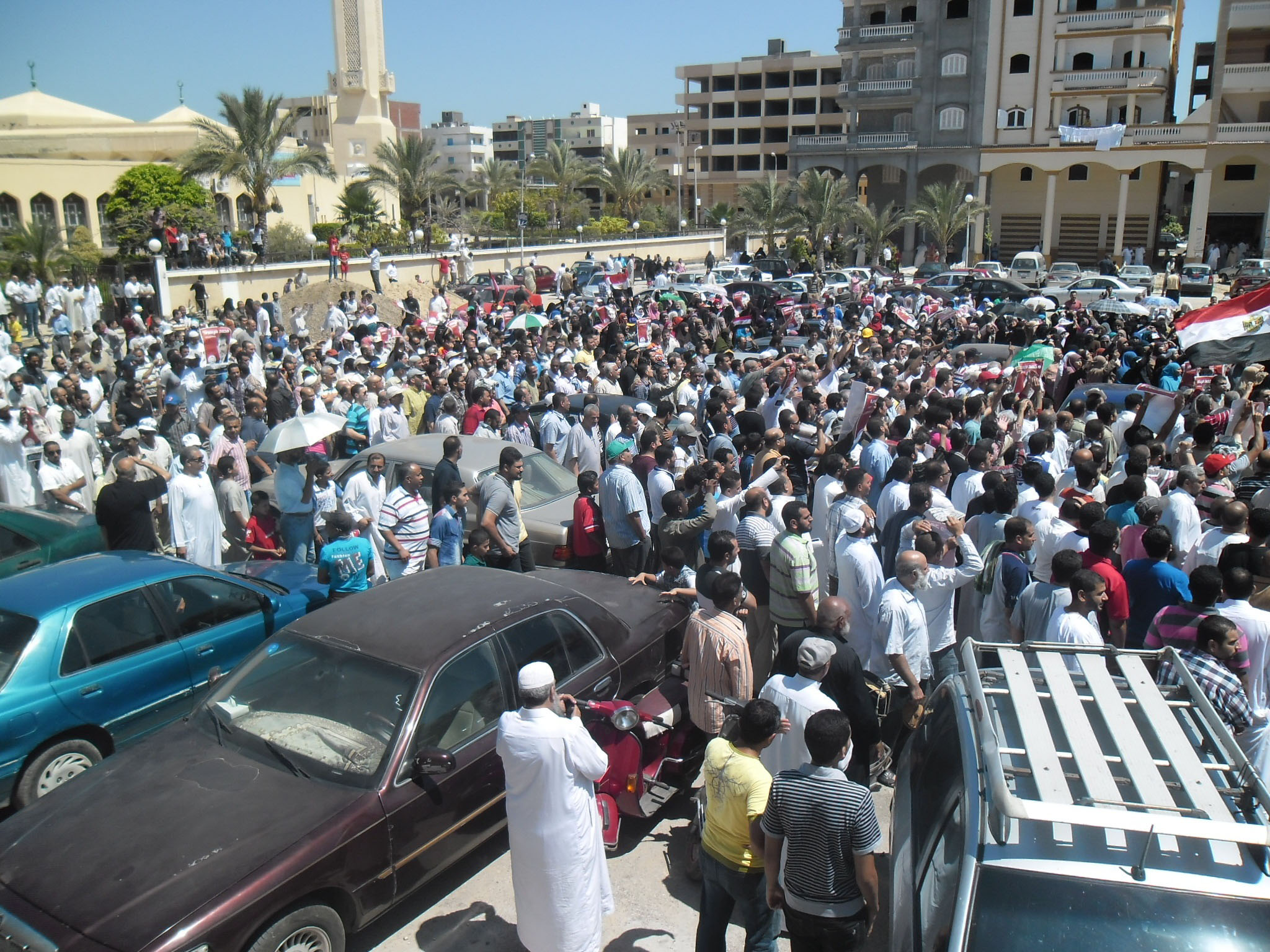
Supporters of the ousted President Morsi demonstrate in Damietta on 5 July

Muslim Brotherhood members and sympathizers rallied across Egypt for what they dubbed a "Friday of Rejection" on 5 July, demanding the reinstatement of Morsi as president. Clashes with police and soldiers turned deadly in some areas, with reported instances of troops firing live ammunition into crowds of protesters. At least 36 were killed and more than 1,000 were injured. Protesters reportedly attacked a police station and military airbase in the North Sinai Governorate, as well as the governorate headquarters, resulting in casualties on both sides.

Palestinian officials in Gaza also said that the Egyptian Armed Forces had shut the Rafah border crossing and that only certain people, such as patients and students, would be allowed through. Egyptian Intelligence Service official Nader al-Asar telephoned Palestinian Prime Minister in Gaza Ismail Haniyeh on the afternoon of 5 July and Haniyeh briefed him about the humanitarian crisis in Gaza as a result of the restrictions on tunnels and the Rafah crossing.

Leaders from the protest movement Tamarod and the National Salvation Front urged demonstrators to "protect their revolutionary legitimacy" and resist unnamed "foreign forces" and supporters of Morsi who might stage a "counter-revolution" in Egypt. Police also announced the arrest of Khairat El-Shater, a figure in the Muslim Brotherhood.

==== 6 July ====
Mohamed ElBaradei was reportedly appointed prime minister by acting President Mansour, over the objections of Islamists. The announcement of ElBaradei's appointment was later retracted, with a spokesman for the president saying no decision had been made on whether ElBaradei or somebody else would be named prime minister. Ahmed Douma, a dissident jailed for "insulting" President Morsi and inciting violence against the Muslim Brotherhood during protests earlier in the year, was released from custody pending a court verdict. Meanwhile, clashes continued on the Sinai Peninsula, with a Coptic Christian priest shot to death by masked gunmen. Pro-Morsi supporters continued their sit-in in front of the Rabia Al-Adawiya Mosque in Nasr City, a suburb of Cairo, demanding the reinstatement of the former president.

==== 7 July ====
Negotiations continued over the prime ministerial appointment, with reports suggesting the Al-Nour Party had objected to ElBaradei's appointment and representatives of the Tamarod movement continuing to push for it. Meanwhile, a message from Mohammed Badie appeared on the Muslim Brotherhood's Facebook page accusing coup leaders of "flagrant violations against the Egyptian people", those opposed to the rule of Morsi mobilized for another day of rallying in Tahrir Square. Huge demonstrations against the military coup, also occurred in manned makeshift roadblocks in Cairo and the Nasr City suburb in Cairo.

=== July 2013 ===
==== 8 July ====
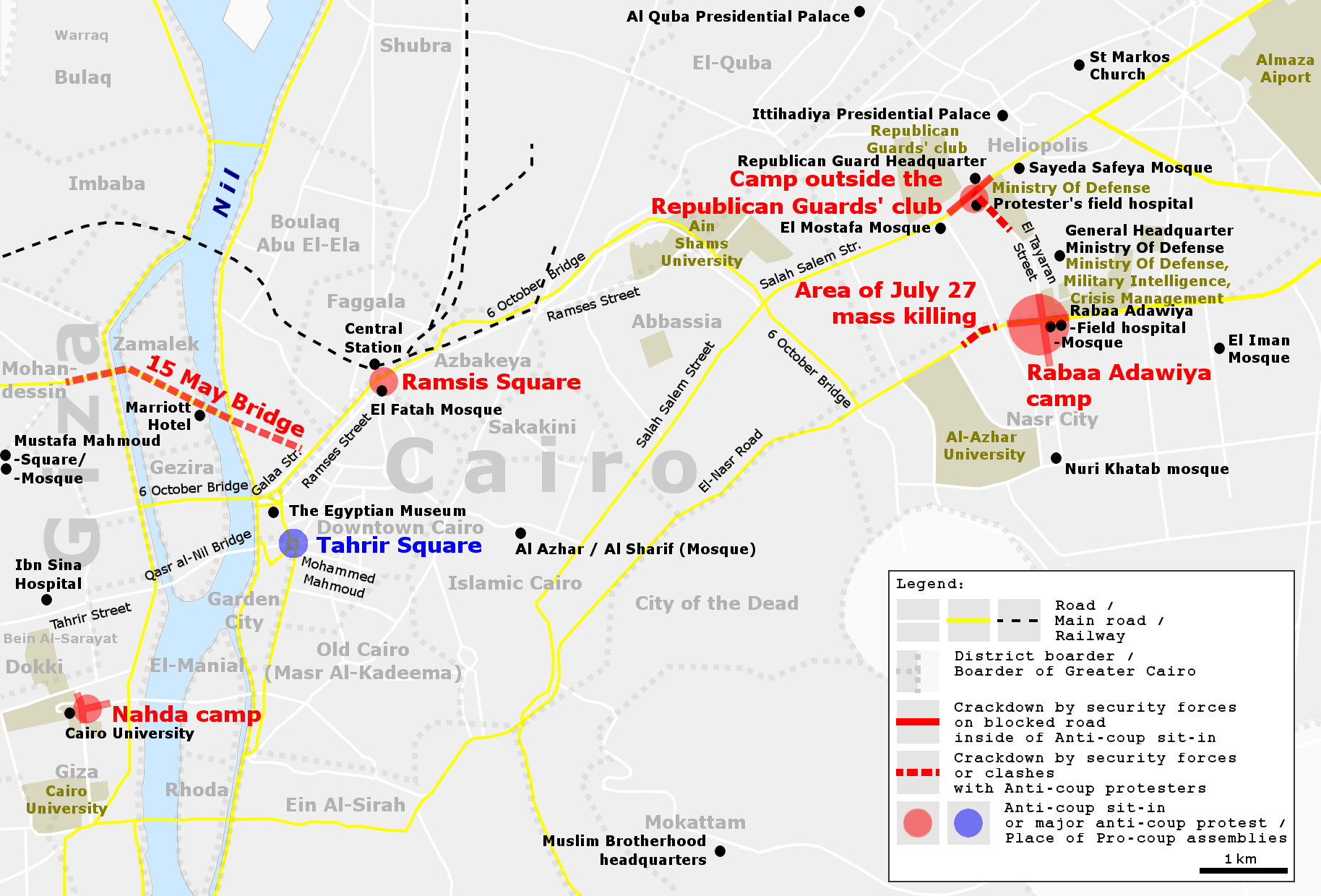
Major mass protester killings in Cairo during pro-Morsi-protests, raided or dispersed by security forces after the military coup of July 2013: 8 July: outside the Republican Guard Club headquarters 27 July: Nasr Street and sit-in at Rabaa Al-Adawiya Mosque 14 August: sit-ins at Rabaa Al-Adawiya Mosque and Nahda Square 16 August: Ramsis Square and marches en route (including 15 May Bridge) 6 October: marches headed from Dokki and Ramsis towards Tahrir Square

According to the Forensic Medical Authority, at least 61 protesters were killed and more than 435 injured, in what was deemed a massacre by the Muslim Brotherhood and those opposed to the coup when police fired on their sit-in during dawn prayers. According to the army, "terrorists" tried to storm the compound, leading to the death of an officer. MP Mohamed Beltagy described the incident as a "massacre" during dawn prayers. After the incident, the Freedom and Justice Party, called for "the international community and international groups and all the free people of the world [to] intervene to stop further massacres [...] and prevent a new Syria in the Arab world." At the same time, Morsi supporters were said by the military of having forced two soldiers, Samir Abdallah Ali and Azzam Hazem Ali, to make pro-Morsi statements on a loudspeaker and that one of them was "severely beaten up" and filmed while making the statements. However, an army official later said that they had "managed to escape their captors."

The Nour Party announced it would not participate in the political transition due to the "massacre", and former Muslim Brotherhood member, moderate Islamist, and 2012 presidential candidate Abdel Moneim Aboul Fotouh called for Mansour to resign. Meanwhile, Mansour issued a proposed timetable for elections to occur within six months.

Following reports that many fighters in Syria were returning in support of the Muslim Brotherhood, Egypt placed restrictions on Syrians entering the country and required them to obtain visas before entering the country.

==== 9 July ====
Amnesty International urged the Egyptian government to probe the "massacre" of the previous day. The army continued to deny it used excessive force, claiming police and troops responded to aggression by armed protesters. Tamarod posted on Twitter that "Mansour's maneuvers will create a new dictatorship", rejecting the proposed election timetable. Mohamed ElBaradei and Hazem Al Beblawi were named vice president and prime minister for the interim government respectively by Mansour.

==== 10 July ====
Ramadan began in Egypt. The Muslim Brotherhood again rejected overtures to participate in the transitional government. Arrest warrants were issued for Mohammed Badie and other top Muslim Brotherhood officials. The Investigative Reporting Program at the University of California at Berkeley reported that a State Department programme ostensibly to support democracy provided funds to activists and politicians for fomenting unrest in Egypt after the ouster of President Hosni Mubarak in February 2011.

==== 11 July ====
The United States formally placed financial aid to Egypt under review.

The Muslim Brotherhood vowed to continue its resistance to the military's ouster of Morsi. In a statement it disavowed itself from an assassination attempt against a senior army commander in the Sinai Peninsula on 10 July and said it adheres to peaceful measures. The statement also read: "We will continue our peaceful resistance to the bloody military coup against constitutional legitimacy. We trust that the peaceful and popular will of the people shall triumph over force and oppression."

Public prosecutor Hisham Barakat issued a temporary freeze on the assets of senior leaders of the Muslim Brotherhood, as well as senior members of the National Coalition for Supporting Legitimacy, pending investigations in ongoing cases related to events in al-Mokatam, al-Nahda square and the Republican Guards Club. The freeze affects the senior Muslim Brotherhood leaders Mohammed Badie, Khairat el-Shater, Mohamed Ezat, Mahi Ekef, Saad El-Katatni, Essam el-Erian and Mohamed Beltagy, as well as the politicians Essam Sultan, Assem Abdul Majed, Safwat Hegazy and Hazem Abu Ismail.

==== 12–23 July ====
On 13 July, Egyptian prosecutors announced a criminal investigation of Morsi for "spying, inciting violence and ruining the economy". Two days later, General Abdul Fattah al-Sisi spoke on state television for the first time since the coup to defend the army's actions. Mohamed ElBaradei was also sworn in as interim vice president the same day, while the assets of 14 prominent Islamists, including Mohammed Badie, were frozen. At least three were also killed and 17 others were wounded in North Sinai when suspected militants fired rocket-propelled grenades at a worker bus.

The Muslim Brotherhood continued its call for more protests after Friday prayers. The protests were held in Cairo and Alexandria with two formations of fighter jets flying over both cities after noon prayers ended as well as military helicopters that flew low over roof tops in the city. Amongst the tens of thousands of protesters present, they chanted "Islamic, Islamic" in calling for an Islamic state.

On 22 July, protests in Cairo led to two deaths at a pro-Morsi rally as unknown gunmen opened fire on demonstrators. A bomb also killed a conscript and injured 15 at a police station in Mansoura. Morsi's family also accused the military of kidnapping him.

The United States called on Egypt's army to free deposed President Mohamed Morsi, amid ongoing protests on the first Friday of Ramadan. U.S. Deputy Secretary of State William J. Burns, the highest-ranking U.S. official to visit Egypt since Morsi's ouster, visited Cairo to meet with representatives of the interim government. Representatives from both Tamarod and the Nour Party refused to meet with Burns, with Tamarod accusing the U.S. of interfering with Egyptian internal affairs. The U.S. also delayed the delivery of F-16 Fighting Falcons from Fort Worth, Texas, to Egypt due to "political reasons."

==== 24 July ====
A bomb exploded at a police station in the Egyptian city of Mansoura, the capital of the Dakahlia Governorate, killing at least one person and injuring 17.

During a speech at a military parade, General Al-Sisi called for mass demonstrations on 26 July to grant his forces a "mandate" to crack down on "terrorism", an apparent reference to the bombing at Mansoura and to restive Islamists continuing to oppose the overthrow of Mohamed Morsi. This was seen as contradicting the military's pledges to hand over power to civilians after removing Dr. Morsi and as an indication for an imminent crackdown against Islamists.

The reactions to Al-Sisi's announcement ranged from open support by the Egyptian presidency and the Tamarod movement to rejection, not only by the Muslim Brotherhood, who called the announcement "an invitation to civil war", but also by the Salafi Al-Nour Party, the Strong Egypt Party, the revolutionary April 6 Youth Movement and the Egyptian Human Rights groups.

==== 26 July ====
In response to General Al-Sisi's call, millions of protesters took part in demonstrations across the country in support of the army including tens of thousands in Cairo's Tahrir Square and at the Presidential Palace. At the same time, smaller demonstrations (thousands of protestors) rallied in Nasr City and at Cairo University in protest at the military coup. While the demonstrations in Cairo were largely peaceful, five people including a 14-year-old boy were killed and at least 146 injured in Alexandria, when a pro-army march passed near a demonstration of Morsi supporters at Al-Qaed Ibrahim Mosque. The Health Ministry confirmed a total of nine people killed during protests in Alexandria.

In Sphinx Square in Mohandessin, a group of activists called The Third Square, who mistrust both the military and the Islamists, held their own protest. In a leaflet, they declared their opposition to "the defense minister calling for an authorization to kill Egyptians on the pretext of fighting terrorism".

In a separate development, Egyptian state media announced that deposed President Morsi was being investigated for conspiring with the Palestinian group Hamas in relation to a prison breakout in 2011.

==== 27 July ====
At least 82 were killed early in the morning after security forces opened fire on pro-Morsi demonstrators on a road near the Rabaa Al-Adawiya Mosque, a centre of resistance to the military coup. The health ministry said 82 were confirmed dead and 299 injured, while doctors at the field hospital said at least 200 protesters had been killed and 4,500 injured. A Brotherhood spokesman said police used live ammunition and shot to kill.

Interior Minister Mohamed Ibrahim said police had been forced to intervene after demonstrators clashed with locals while trying to block a major bridge. He claimed that police did not use live ammunition and attempted to disperse protesters with tear gas. However, multiple photos on the internet show clearly the police and army forces using live ammunition and automatic guns. Meanwhile, Al-Nour Party leader Younis Makhyoun called for a full investigation into the incident, which the Brotherhood described as a "massacre", and angry activists chanted violent slogans calling for Sisi to be executed during pro-Morsi protests during the day.

Two days later, the United States White House released a statement that read it "strongly condemns the bloodshed and violence" in Cairo and Alexandria, while calling on the military-backed interim government to respect the rights of demonstrators.

==== 30–31 July ====
On 30 July, a member of the Palestinian movement Hamas named Salah al-Bardaweel said that it had documentary proof that the interim government was colluding with its Palestinian rivals, Fatah and the Palestinian National Authority, in pushing forward a malicious agenda to tarnish the group, while it also denied involvement in the Egypt protests following the coup. Fatah termed the documents as "fabrications" in rejecting the allegations.

The next day, the interim cabinet warned that it would use any measures to deal with the pro-Morsi protesters' sit-in in dispersing them.

=== August 2013 ===
On 11 August, efforts by the international community to end the standoff and find a peaceful resolution to the crisis failed. Egypt's prime minister warned just ahead of the Muslim Eid al-Fitr holiday that ends Sunday that the government's decision to clear the sit-ins was "irreversible."

On 12 August, supporters of toppled president Mohamed Morsi increased the pressure on Egypt's interim leadership by defiantly flooding into two protest camps Monday, prompting police to postpone moving against the 6-week-old sit-ins to "avoid bloodshed" and delayed taking any action. The Interior Ministry has depicted the encampments as a public danger, saying 11 bodies bearing signs of torture were found near both sites. Amnesty International has also reported that anti-Morsi protesters have been captured, beaten, subjected to electric shocks or stabbed. At least eight bodies have arrived at a morgue in Cairo bearing signs of torture, the human rights group said.

==== 13–14 August ====
On 13 August, Egyptian interim President Adly Mansour appointed 18 new provincial governors, many of them former military officers, removing all Muslim Brotherhood members who had been in office, triggering a wave of criticism from groups and activists who decried the appointments of mainly former security officials to the posts. According to The Economist a number of those newly appointed governors "had glaring records of hostility to the 2011 revolution."

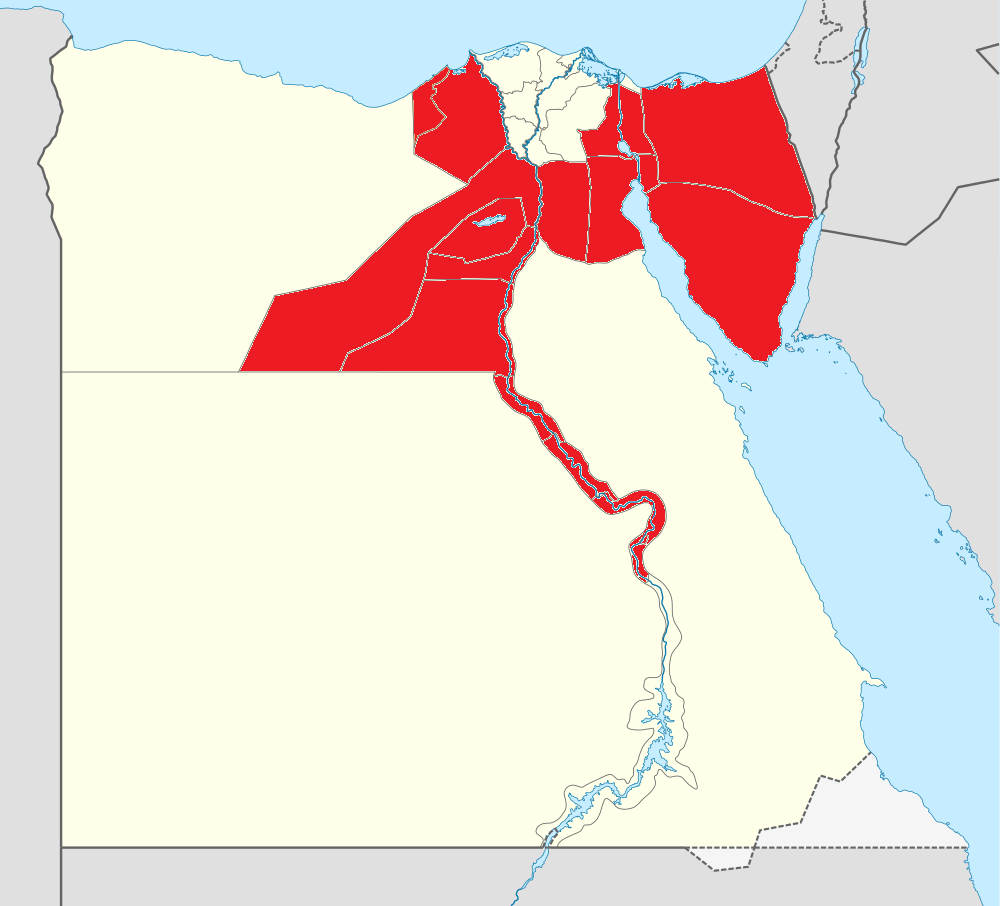
Map showing areas in Egypt affected by curfew after 14 August

Shortly after dawn on 14 August, Egyptian police raided two large encampments by supporters of ousted president Mohamed Morsi in Cairo to forcibly disperse them, after six weeks of unauthorized sit-in, sparking deadly clashes that drew global condemnation from world states. The Egyptian government announced a one-month state of emergency as a result of the deadly clashes. A spokesman for Egypt's health ministry said the death toll has reached 638 of which 595 are civilians and 43 police officers with at least 3,994 injured. Additionally according to workers at the Al Iman mosque, over 200 bodies, which had been moved from a protest camp nearby, are not included in the official Health Ministry tally. The Muslim Brotherhood has said the true death toll was far higher, with a spokesman saying 2,000 people had been killed in the "massacre". Among the dead was the daughter of Mohamed el-Beltagy, a prominent lawmaker. Four journalists were killed and several others were injured or arrested. Egyptian Vice President Mohamed ElBaradei resigned on the same day following the violent actions by security forces against the protesters.

==== 15–16 August ====
On 15 August, following the security forces raids on Cairo protest camps held by supporters of deposed president Mohamed Morsi, churches across Egypt came under frenzied attack Thursday as Morsi loyalists allegedly orchestrated nationwide assaults on Christian targets throughout the country. It's estimated that as many as 36 churches were "completely" devastated by fire across nine Egyptian governorates and many other churches were looted or stormed. Egypt's army chief Gen. Abdel-Fattah el-Sissi pledged the military would cover the costs of restoration for all damaged churches. Morsi's Islamist backers also set dozens of police stations ablaze across Egypt and attempted to storm provincial governor offices following Wednesday's bloody crackdown. A group of Morsi supporters also set fire to the finance ministry building in Cairo's Nasr City district.

The unrest led the interim government to declare a month-long state of emergency, with a daily curfew between 7:00pm and 6:00am in Cairo and 12 other governorates.

Several episodes of clashes are reported in Cairo, Alexandria and other major cities. The interim Interior Minister authorized the police agents and the military to shoot on sight anyone who is involved in unrests. All touristic attractions and antiquities museums are closed all over the country, many suffering looting episodes.

The army blocked all major streets and squares, among which, Tahrir Square. The early clashes caused many deaths, at least 80 in Cairo, 5 in Fayoum, 10 in Ismailia, 8 in Damietta and at least 1 in Al Arish.

On 16 August Ammar Badie, the son of Mohammed Badie, was among the 173 killed in clashes that were part of a Muslim Brotherhood orchestrated "Day of Rage".

==== 17–18 August ====
On 17 August, security forces cleared a Cairo mosque after a standoff with anti-government protesters barricaded inside. The confrontation at the al-Fath mosque continued for most of Saturday—with exchanges of gunfire between security forces and protesters.

On 18 August, a convoy carrying about 600 detainees to Abu Zaabal Prison near Cairo resulted in at least 35 deaths. The interior ministry said that the detainees tried to escape from the convoy and took an officer hostage. They then said that police fired tear gas back at them and the detainees died as a result of suffocation. However, the Muslim Brotherhood disputed the claim and said that its supporters were killed in cold blood and called for an international inquiry into the incident.

25 Egyptian policemen died on 19 August in an attack in Egypt's Sinai Peninsula by militant Islamists.

In all, nearly 1,000 people have been killed in clashes between security forces and supporters of ousted President Mohamed Morsi during 14–18 August.

On 19 August, the government banned vigilante groups known as "people's committees" that are armed with clubs, sticks and guns and have appeared on Egyptian streets as of mid-August 2013.

=== September 2013 ===
==== 5 September ====
On 5 September 2013, interior minister Mohamed Ibrahim Moustafa was the target of an assassination attempt; the attempt failed, though 21 people were injured and one person died.

==== 19 September ====
One police officer was killed in Giza in an Islamist dominated town, more than 50 Islamists were arrested on the crackdown.

=== October 2013 ===
On 6 October 2013, at least 57 were killed and 393 injured across the country when anti-coup protesters and security forces clashed amid celebrations of the 40th anniversary of the start of the 1973 Mideast war with Israel. Pitched battles were fought for hours in some Cairo neighborhoods, where 48 of the 57 fatalities occurred. Residents reported areas of the city looked like combat zones, with tires burning and thick black smoke rising over the streets.

Violence continued on 7 October, as unidentified gunmen attacked an Army convoy west of Ismailiya, near the Suez Canal, killing all six passengers, including an officer and a lieutenant. Shortly before that a suicide bomber attacked the security headquarters in the Southern Sinai capital of El-Tor, killing three and injuring at least 55. In addition, two rocket-propelled grenades hit a major satellite station in the affluent Cairo suburb of Maadi, causing some damage, but no casualties.

=== November 2013 ===
On 15 November, two teenagers were killed in Friday clashes as the curfew was removed.

On 19 November, revolutionaries clashed with military supporters in the second anniversary of the Mohamed Mahmoud massacre that killed 61 in three days. The clashes left two people dead, both men aged 20 and 25, the deaths were caused by birdshot wounds.

On 21 November, Islamist students from Azhar University clashed with police forces, Islamist students have been protesting since the beginning of the studying year in universities, one Islamist student was killed by a birdshot wound in the head, students after that protested against the violence.

On 22 November, Friday Clashes left three people killed, one child was killed as well, 15 others were injured nationwide. Friday is usually a day of clashes and protests. In Minya in Upper Egypt one was killed, 21-year-old Salah Adel died because of a gunshot wound in the chest. The Friday marked 100 days passed since the 14 August raids.

On 28 November, clashes between Islamist students and police left one student killed by a gunshot wound to the neck, the protest was organized without following the protest law, another student was injured and in critical condition.

=== December 2013 ===
On 13 December, two people were killed on Friday clashes, 14 others were injured and 54 were arrested, the numbers were lower due to low temperature.

On 16 December, a taxi driver was lynched to death by an Islamist mob, the taxi driver went through the crowd and accidentally ran over a female protester, the 24-year-old Mohamed Othman had his taxi torched after his death, and Islamists spraypainted 'killer' on his cab.

On 24 December, a car bomb went off in Mansoura and left 16 people dead, the bomb was at a security headquarters and killed 14 officers and 2 civilians, the Muslim Brotherhood was declared a terror group and accused of carrying out the attacks, but Ansar Bait Al-Maqdis claims it did it, The group carries out regular attacks in the Sinai Insurgency.

On 27 December, Friday clashes left 5 people dead, and 265 arrested, the protest were sparked when the Muslim Brotherhood was officially banned, police apparently fired bullets.

=== January 2014 ===
On 3 January 2014, six months after Morsi's ouster, 13 people were killed in clashes between Islamists, their opponents, and the police.

On 10 January 4 people were killed in Friday clashes, as soldiers opened fire in Suez and killed 3 people from Youth Against Coup group, 1 other was killed in Alexandria.

On 14 January 11 people were killed in clashes on the 2014 Egyptian constitutional referendum, the clashes were between supporters and opponents of the constitution.

On 16 January 1 student named Omar was killed in clashes between students and police officers, more than 10 others were injured and 23 were arrested, the university president's son was injured.

On 24 January, four bomb blasts hit Cairo; the blasts killed 6 and also blew up the Cairo police headquarters and a nearby Islamic museum; Ansar Bait al-Maqdis took responsibility for all four of the blasts; though a group called Egypt's Soldiers took responsibility for the blast near the metro station. 15 others were killed in clashes; a total of 21 were killed that day.

On 25 January 64 people were killed on the third anniversary of the Egyptian Revolution of 2011, mostly by gunshot wounds; tens of thousands protested against the military and the ministry of interior, while protestors in favor of the Egyptian military celebrated in Tahrir Square. Clashes took place between anti-military and police forces; some clashes occurred between pro- and anti-military forces, the anti-military crowd was made up of the Muslim Brotherhood and the Way of the Revolution Front; there were also other movements and unaffiliated protesters, there were reports of police using live ammunition in 2 areas.

On 31 January 1 person was killed and 35 were injured in Friday clashes.

=== February 2014 ===
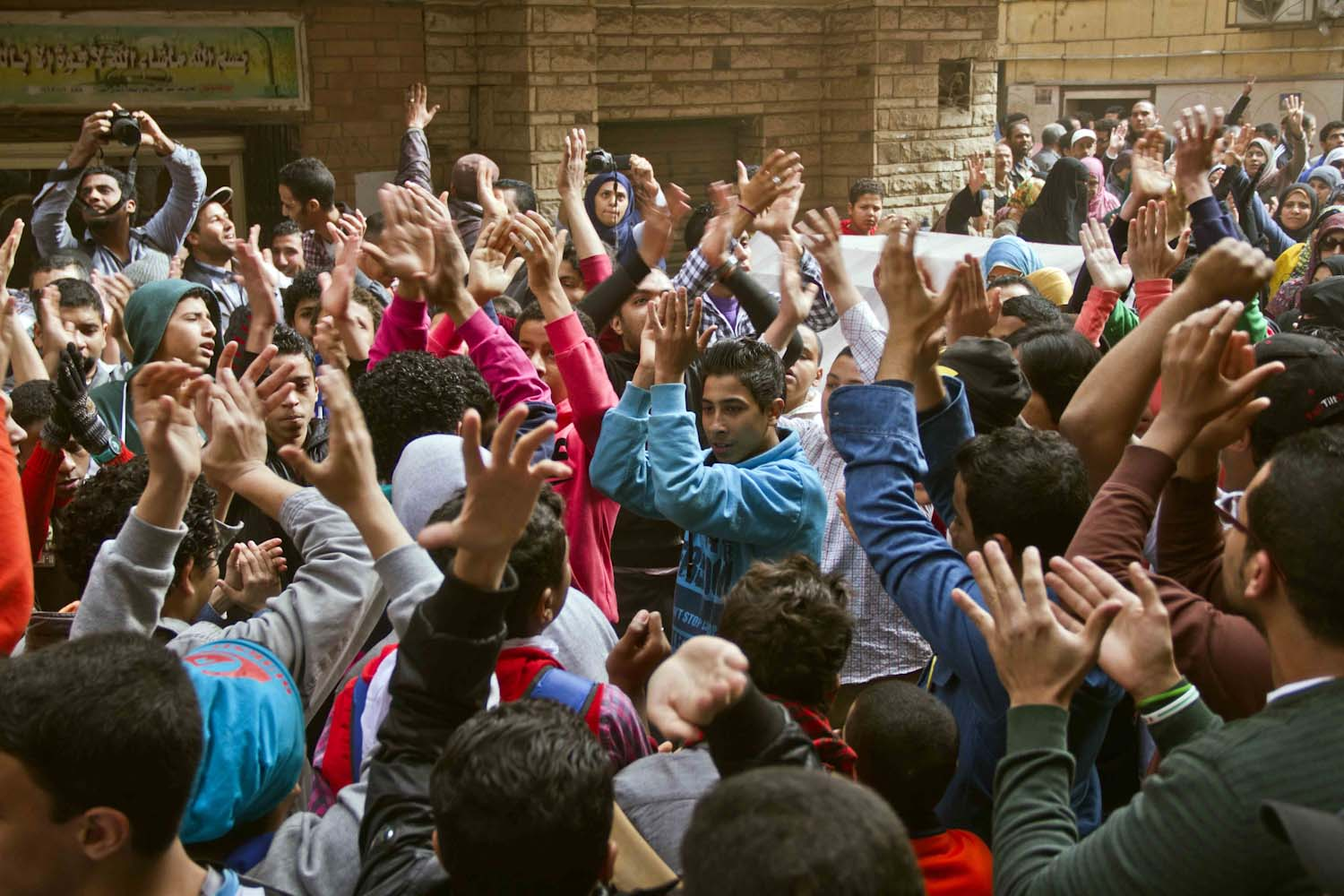
Anti-coup protesters march in Cairo, 14 February 2014

On 7 February 3 people were killed in Friday clashes including a teenager, 4 security personnel were injured in Friday clashes.

On 14 February 2 people were killed in Friday clashes with Morsi-loyalists, including a 12-year-old boy.

On 16 February 4 people, 3 South Koreans and a bus driver, were killed after a terrorist bomb exploded on a tourist bus on the border crossing with Israel at Taba. The perpetrators are believed to be Ansar Bait al-Maqdis which are allied with Morsi-loyalists.

=== March 2014 ===
On 19 March, five people were killed in a day where the Anti-Coup Alliance called for protests, protests were held beside universities; a 14 year old was also killed in the clashes.

On 21 March, Friday clashes left two killed by birdshot wounds.

On 24 March, a court in Minya, south of the capital, Cairo, convicted 529 (some sources say 528) persons accused with many charges including murdering a policeman and attacks on people and property and sentenced all convicted to death. They are convicted for killing of a police officer and attacking on people and property. A spokesman of Muslim Brotherhood questioned the unprecedented speedy trial and said the verdict came from a Kangaroo court. The spokesman also pointed that the sentences showed a comeback of dictatorship to Egypt. The interim government launched a severe crackdown on Muslim Brotherhood following the 2013 coup. All the sentenced persons are supporters of Muslim Brotherhood and ousted Egyptian President Mohamed Morsi. After a compulsory review by the Grand Mufti, on 28 April the court changed the sentences to life imprisonment for all but 37 of them, but sentenced to death another 683 people.

=== April 2014 ===
On 9 April, Egyptian security forces attacked a large number of student protesters across the country.

On 25 April, Friday protests erupted throughout the country, resulting in at least 2 deaths during clashes with security forces.

=== May 2014 ===
On 23 May, protests broke out in several provinces of Egypt, resulting 2 deaths in al-Fayyoum and 1 death in Cairo during clashes with security forces. Twenty-three people were injured.

=== Subsequent clashes ===
==== June 2014 ====
On 20 June, Friday protests against the new president set off in most provinces of Egypt, resulting in 2 deaths in Cairo and dozens of injured protesters.

==== July 2014 ====
On the occasion of the anniversary of Morsi's overthrow, protests broke out. During clashes with security forces at least 3 protesters died and more than hundred Morsi supporters had been arrested.

==== November 2014 ====
On 17 November, minor protests against the president broke out in several provinces of Egypt. During clashes with security forces at least two protesters were killed in the province of Al-Fayyoum and in Ain Shams in the vicinity of Cairo. Thirteen protesters had been arrested.

On 28 November, more small protests against the Sisi government broke out in response to opposition groups' call for an "Islamic revolution" in Egypt. At least four protesters and two policemen were killed during clashes.

==== January 2015 ====
On Friday 23 January 2015, a 17-year-old girl, Sondos Abu Bakr, was killed during protests in Alexandria against the coup which deposed Mohamed Morsi.

On Saturday 24 January 2015, police fired at a handful of activists of the Socialist Popular Alliance Party marching to Tahrir Square in Cairo with flowers to commemorate the demonstrators killed there during the 2011 Egyptian revolution. A 32-year-old woman, Shaimaa al-Sabbagh, was shot at close range and died shortly afterwards. Videos of her death were posted on YouTube, drawing widespread condemnation and comparisons to the death of Neda Agha Soltan in Iran in 2009. Authorities initially denied that police officers were responsible for her death, and prosecutors opened an investigation. Human Rights Watch claimed that video and photographic evidence as well as witnesses pointed to a member of Egypt's security forces being responsible for al-Sabbagh's death, and demanded accountability.

On Sunday 25 January 2015, on the fourth anniversary of the 2011 Egyptian revolution, at least 18 people were killed in protests in Cairo and across Egypt. According to authorities, two or three of those killed were militants trying to plant a bomb, and three others were policemen. At least 12 others were civilians killed by security forces. Dozens of protesters were injured and hundreds were arrested.

== Casualties ==
Date	Killed
8 July 2013	61
27 July 2013	at least 120
14 August 2013	at least 904
16 August 2013	173
6 September 2013	2
19 September 2013	1
4 October 2013	4
6 October 2013	57
7 October 2013	9
15 November 2013	2
19 November 2013	2
21 November 2013	1
22 November 2013	3
28 November 2013	1
13 December 2013	2
16 December 2013	1
24 December 2013	16
27 December 2013	5
3 January 2014	13
10 January 2014	4
14 January 2014	11
16 January 2014	1
24 January 2014	21
25 January 2014	64

=== Minor protests ===
Date	Killed
31 January 2014	1
7 February 2014	3
14 February 2014	2
19 March 2014	5
21 March 2014	1
28 March 2014	5
25 April 2014	2
23 May 2014	3
20 June 2014	2
3 July 2014	5
11 July 2014	2
28 July 2014	5
14 August 2014	4
15 August 2014	10
7 November 2014	2
28 November 2014	6
13 December 2014	1
23 January 2015	1
24 January 2015	1
25 January 2015	18
