= Islamic Party (Egypt) =

Political party in Egypt

- Leader: Muhammad Hegazy
- Secretary-General: Mohamed Abu Samra
- Deputy Head: Magdy Salem
- Founded: April 2011
- Ideology: Islamism; Religious conservatism Mixed economy
- National affiliation: Egyptian Islamic Jihad
- House of Representatives: 0 / 568

Logo of the party under its former name

The Islamic Party (formerly known as the Peace and Development Party (Arabic: حزب السلامة والتنمية, romanized: Ḥizb as-salāma wa-t-tanmiya) or Safety and Development Party) is an Islamist political party in Egypt. The name of the party was changed in approximately December 2012. The main leaders of the group are Mohamed Abu Samra and Kamal Habib. The party is backed by the Egyptian Islamic Jihad group. Most of the founders of the party are former members of the organization. Many members of the party have court rulings that bar them from running for elected office.

The party and Egyptian Islamic Jihad withdrew from the Anti-Coup Alliance in January 2014. One of the reasons for the withdrawal was the rejection by the pro-Morsi coalition of the initiative put forth by the Islamic Party that sought to end the crisis by appointing a presidential council composed of a civilian, an Islamist and a member of the army. The party called for a "negotiated" solution on 8 February 2014. The party rejoined the alliance around March 2014, though there are indications that it has withdrawn again.

== Basic tenets ==
The party is in favour of putting the Camp David Accords to a public referendum, expanding Islamic banking, abolishing mixed-sex education in secondary schools, forming a cultural media council to monitor the Egyptian media, respecting private property, progressive taxation, and is in favour of setting a minimum and maximum wage in line with inflation.

== Ideology ==
The secretary general of the party, Mohamed Abu Samra, stated that it would vigorously oppose returning Egyptian Jews of Israeli descent to Egypt in response to a comment made by Essam el-Erian, a member of the Freedom and Justice Party and an adviser to President Morsi; he also stated that according to Sharia law, Jews deserve to be killed.

== See also ==
- List of Islamic political parties
- Building and Development Party
