= Mohamed Abu Samra =

Egyptian Islamist

Mohamed Abu Samra is the secretary-general of the Islamic Party, the political arm of Egyptian Islamic Jihad. Abu Samra stated in an interview in April 2013 that the Muslim Brotherhood was not successful in applying Sharia (Islamic law) and that he supported a change of government. In an interview with Cairo Al-Akhbar, he called for a revolt if President Mohamed Morsi was deposed. As of September 2013 he called for peaceful protests and disavowed the actions of jihadist groups in the Sinai. He called on Egyptian judges to adhere to the law by stopping their strike that occurred in 2012. Abu Samra said that he would be opposed towards returning Israeli Jews of Egyptian descent to Egypt in response to a comment made by Essam el-Erian, a member of the Freedom and Justice Party and an adviser to then president Mohamed Morsi; he also stated that according to Sharia law, Jews deserve to be fought and killed by Muslims.
