= 2014 Egyptian presidential election =

- 26–28 May 2014
- Registered: 53,848,890
- Turnout: 47.50%
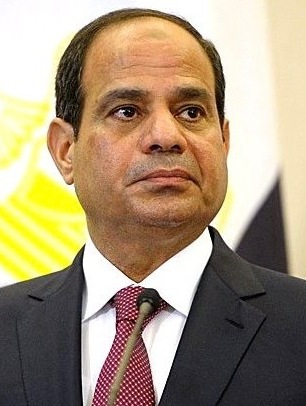

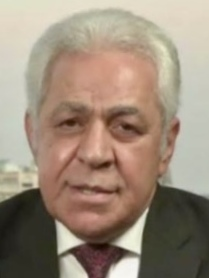
Candidate	Abdel Fattah el-Sisi	Hamdeen Sabahi
Party	Independent	Popular Current
Popular vote	23,780,104	757,511
Percentage	96.91%	3.09%
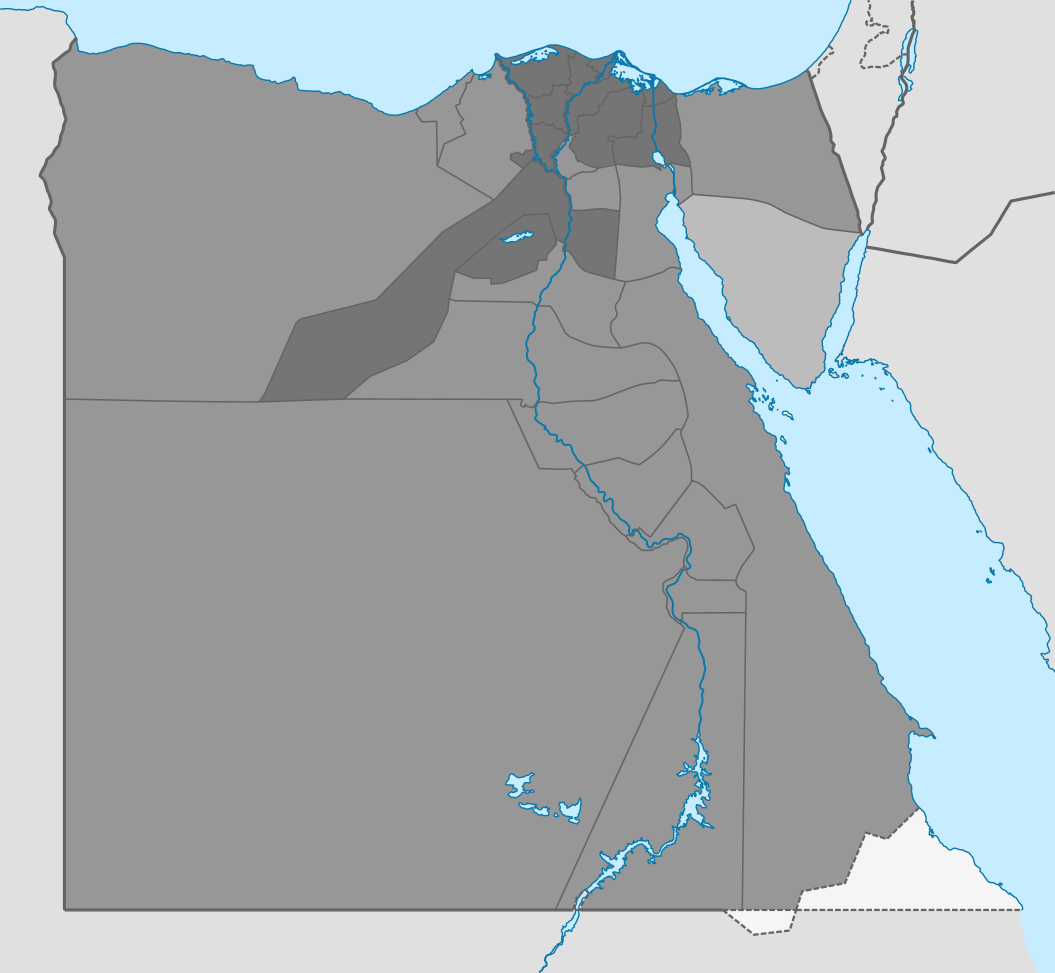
- Results by governorate El-Sisi: 90–94% 95–97% >98%
President before election
Adly Mansour (acting)
Independent
Elected President
Abdel Fattah el-Sisi
Independent

Presidential elections were held in Egypt between 26 and 28 May 2014. There were only two candidates, former Egyptian defence minister Abdel Fattah el-Sisi and Egyptian Popular Current candidate Hamdeen Sabahi. El-Sisi won the election, which was neither free nor fair, in a landslide victory, having received 97% of votes. The elections were marred by irregularities, repression of el-Sisi's political opponents, and suppression of free speech.

Before announcing his candidacy in the election, el-Sisi, who as Defence Minister also served as Commander-in-Chief of the Egyptian Armed Forces, was responsible for officially announcing the removal of president Mohamed Morsi from office in the aftermath of the June 2013 Egyptian protests. After Morsi's removal, Sisi installed a temporary interim government, but remained Egypt's Minister of Defence and assumed the role of the country's First Deputy Prime Minister. On 26 March 2014, he officially retired from the military, and announced that he would run as a candidate in the 2014 presidential election. The election, held between 26 and 28 May and which included only one opponent, was boycotted by some political parties, as well as many Islamists, including the Muslim Brotherhood's Freedom & Justice Party, the Brotherhood itself having been previously declared a terrorist organization in December 2013.

The elections, which were planned to take place for two days, were extended to a third day. Official figures showed that 25,578,233 people voted in the elections, and the election had a turnout of 47.5% (lower than the 2012 election's 52%), with el-Sisi winning with 23.78 million votes, 96.91%, ten million more votes than former president Mohamed Morsi (who garnered 13 million votes against his opponent in the close runoff of the 2012 election).

== Background ==
After the fall of longtime leader Hosni Mubarak, the Muslim Brotherhood went on to win in elections for the Shura Council and then the 2012 presidential election. Following economic hardship and instability, a large uprising against the Muslim Brotherhood regime of Morsi was followed by the overthrow of Morsi, the suspension of the 2012 constitution, the dissolution of the Shura Council, as well as a roadmap which outlined future elections which would follow the drafting and approval of a new constitution.

As part of the roadmap which ensued followed the overthrow of Morsi, then-minister of defense Abdel Fattah el-Sisi declared that elections would be preceded by a constitutional referendum. Interim president Adly Mansour announced on 26 January 2014 that the presidential election would be held before the parliamentary election. A five-member commission was formed to monitor the election. The deadline for proposals regarding the elections law was 9 February. The presidential elections law was issued by the president on 8 March.

On 24 March, an Egyptian court sentenced 529 Muslim Brotherhood members to death following an attack on a police station, and two days later, on 26 March Egypt's public prosecutor declared that another 919 Brotherhood members would be tried for murder and terrorism. On the same day, Sisi announced that he would stand as a candidate in the presidential election.

Between the removal of Morsi and the 2014 presidential elections, it is reported that an estimated 20,000 activists and dissidents were arrested by the police under the interim government.

== Regulations ==
Candidates were able to apply for nomination to the presidency between 31 March and 20 April 2014. The final list of candidates approved by the Supreme Election Committee was announced on 2 May. Candidates were allowed to spend a maximum of LE20 million for campaigning. The final results of the election were officially scheduled to be announced on 5 June; however, the official announcement of the results took place earlier, on 3 June.

== Timetable ==
Date	Legal action	Duration
31 March 2014 – 20 April 2014	Candidates can be nominated	21 days
Approximately 21 April 2014	Announcing the initial list and number of supporters per candidate	1 day
22 April 2014 – 23 April 2014	Receiving objections to candidates	2 days
24 April 2014 – 26 April 2014	Reviewing objections	3 days
27 April 2014	Notifying the rejected candidates	1 day
28 April 2014 – 29 April 2014	Receiving grievances from the rejected candidates	2 days
30 April 2014 – 1 May 2014	The disposition of grievances cases	2 days
2 May 2014	Announcing the final list	1 day
3 May 2014 – 23 May 2014	Presidential campaigns are run	20 days
Approximately 2 May 2014	Choosing the campaigns' symbols	
9 May 2014	Last date for withdrawal	1 day
15 May 2014 – 18 May 2014	First round for Egyptians outside Egypt	4 days
24 May 2014 – 25 May 2014	Candidates not allowed to campaign during this period	2 days
26 May 2014 – 27 May 2014	First round for Egyptians within Egypt	2 days
28 May 2014	Original end of vote counting (Later on extended 3rd day of voting)	
29 May 2014	Receiving the grievances cases of the committee decisions	
30 May 2014 – 31 May 2014	The disposition of grievances cases	2 days
5 June 2014	Announcing the final result of the first round (or final result if winner receives more than 50% of the vote)	1 day
6 June 2014 – 9 June 2014	Voting for Egyptians outside Egypt in the second round	4 days
6 June 2014 – 17 June 2014	The second round's presidential campaigns	12 days
15 June 2014	Candidates not allowed to campaign during this period	1 day
16 June 2014 – 17 June 2014	Voting for Egyptians within Egypt in the second round (if needed)	2 days
18 June 2014	Counting votes	1 day
19 June 2014	Receiving the grievances cases of the committee decisions	1 day
20 June 2014 – 21 June 2014	The disposition of grievances cases	2 days
26 June 2014	Announcing the final result of the presidential election (if no candidate wins more than 50% in the first round)	1 day

Source: "Time Schedule for the Dates and Proceduresof the 2014 Presidential Elections" (PDF). Presidential Election Committee.

== Candidates ==
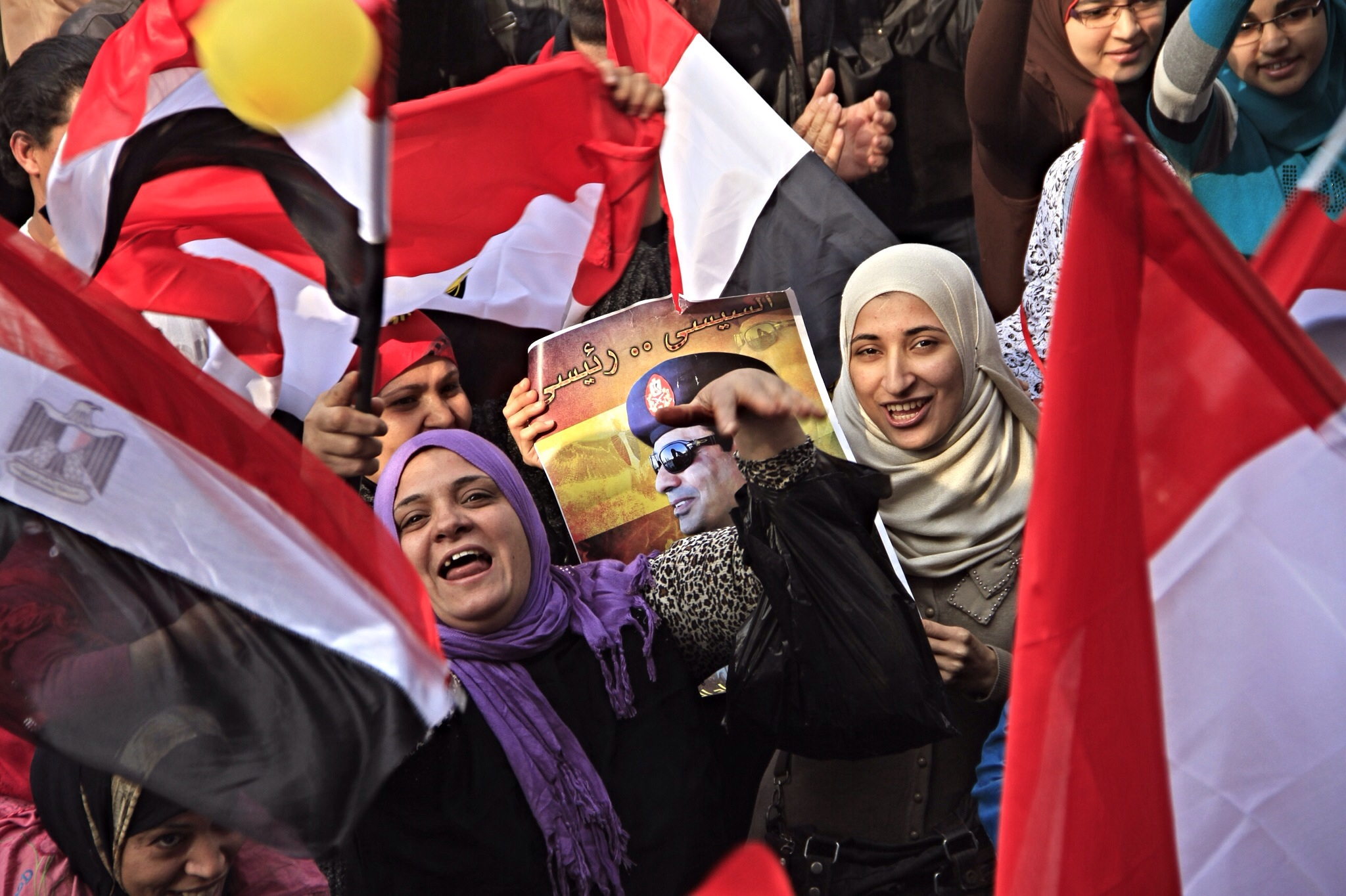
Participants holding flags and pictures of Abdel Fattah el-Sisi

Hamdeen Sabahi, a former presidential candidate in the 2012 presidential election, officially announced his presidential bid on 8 February 2014. However, the Sabahi campaign had criticized the presidential elections law promulgated by the interim government, deeming its characteristics troubling for the transparency and fairness of the election. The pro-Sabahi Revolution's Candidate campaign had also expressed reservations about the nature of the presidential elections law, suggesting that the provision establishing inviolability for the decisions of the Supreme Electoral Committee raises doubts about the integrity of the election process and could potentially force a reassessment of the Sabahi candidacy. On 14 March, Hamdeen Sabahi's presidential campaign announced that Sabahi had decided to continue his candidacy in the presidential election, despite the perceived unconstitutionality of the presidential elections law. Sabahi has taken the medical tests needed to run for presidential office. Sabahi acquired 31,555 endorsements.

Abdel Fattah el-Sisi confirmed on 26 March that he will run for president, which also led to his simultaneous permanent retirement from the Armed Forces. Sisi submitted 188,930 endorsements (though 500,000 were collected) and was the first candidate to submit all required documentation.

Sisi and Sabahi were announced as the official candidates by the Presidential Election Commission on 2 May 2014.

== Other candidates and nominations ==
The New Wafd Party stated on 27 January 2014 that it would not nominate anyone for presidency. The Free Egyptians Party announced on 27 April 2014 that it would not nominate any members to presidential elections. Adly Mansour, stated in November 2013 that he would not run. Amr Moussa, who finished fifth in the 2012 presidential election, has stated that he would not run for the presidency. The Nour Party did not nominate anyone for the presidency. Abdel Moneim Aboul Fotouh, who finished fourth in the 2012 election, announced on 9 February 2014 that he would not run. On 13 March, Lieutenant General Sami Anan announced he will not run for president.

Khaled Ali, a labor lawyer and former presidential candidate, withdrew his candidacy on 16 March after the passage of the presidential elections law, describing the election as a "farce" while also urging el-Sisi not to run and the army to stay out of politics. Ahmed Shafiq, who finished second in the 2012 presidential election, losing to Mohamed Morsi, announced on 20 March that he would not run for president.

Murad Muwafi, who is the former director of Egyptian General Intelligence, announced on 30 March that he would not run for president. Lawyer Mortada Mansour announced on 6 April that he would run for president, though on 19 April, he announced his withdrawal from the election and endorsed el-Sisi. News presenter Bothaina Kamel announced on 12 April that she would run, but she could not collect the required endorsements.

A movement called Taharor had launched, in coordination with the Constitution Party and with 6 April movement, a nationwide campaign to collect 50,000 signatures in favor of Mohammed ElBaradei running for the presidency. Another campaign, called Authorize El Baradei, also started in order to gain endorsements to convince ElBaradei to run for the presidency. However, ElBaradei was ultimately not a presidential candidate.

== Endorsements and opposition ==
=== Sisi endorsements ===
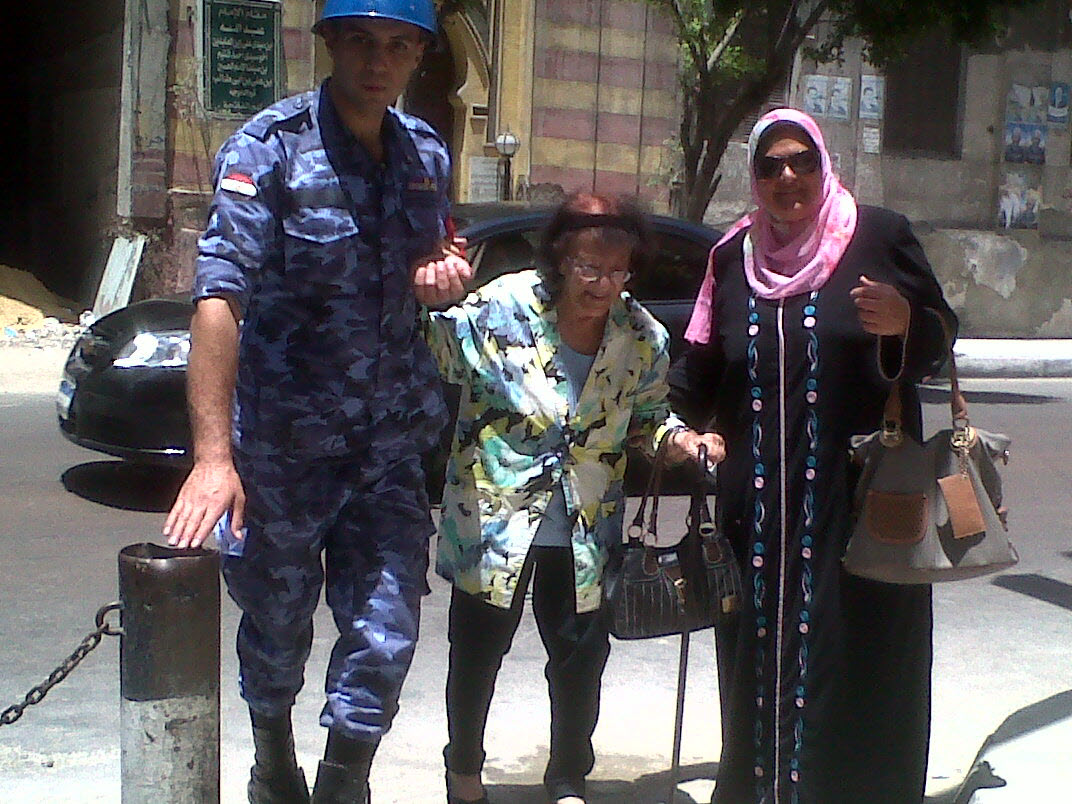
A soldier escorts an elderly woman to a polling station in Alexandria, 27 May 2014

A movement called Finish Your Favor claimed to have collected 26 million signatures asking el-Sisi to run for president. The Revolutionary Forces Bloc backed el-Sisi for president. Tamarod supported el-Sisi as did the Arab Democratic Nasserist Party and the Misr Balady front. The Moderate Front, which is a group made up of former jihadis, ex-members of the Muslim Brotherhood and ex-al-Gama'a al-Islamiyya members, supported el-Sisi.

The New Wafd Party announced their support for el-Sisi on 7 April. The Free Egyptians Party announced on 27 April 2014 that it would back el-Sisi. The Nour Party announced their support for el-Sisi on 3 May. The Tagammu Party and Congress Party announced on 4 May 2014 that they would back el-Sisi for president. Moussa has stated that el-Sisi is the most qualified candidate for the presidency. Ex-President Hosni Mubarak stated in a phone interview that Egyptians should back Sisi, though Mubarak's lawyer has disputed the idea that Mubarak has commented about Sisi's candidacy. In that same interview, Mubarak criticized Sabahi, saying that he is "not fit" to be president. Former king Fuad II stated in an October 2013 interview with L'Illustré that he planned to back Sisi should he run for president. The families of Anwar Sadat and Saad el-Shazly also backed el-Sisi. The Egyptian Patriotic Movement announced on 13 May that it would support Sisi.

=== Sabahi endorsements, opposition to Sisi's candidacy and Mona el-Beheiri ===
The Strong Egypt Party, headed by Aboul Fotouh, himself a former member of the Muslim Brotherhood, opposed el-Sisi's candidacy. Sabahi had criticized the possibility of having someone with a past military background become the next president, arguing that such an outcome would run counter to the goals of the Egyptian revolution. He also expressed doubt about Sisi's commitment to democracy, and argued that the retired Field Marshal bore a measure of direct and indirect responsibility for the human rights violations carried out during the period of the interim government. Sabahi denounced what he deemed to be the interim government's hostility toward the goals of the revolution.

The Road of the Revolution Front, the Constitution Party, both wings of the April 6 Movement and the Anti-Coup Alliance opposed Sisi's election bid. The 6 April movement opposed Sisi's candidacy on the grounds that it would further exacerbate polarization and division. Shortly after Sisi's announcement to run for the presidential elections, some social media users in Egypt and the Arab world responded to el-Sisi's presidential bid announcement with a highly critical viral hashtag ("vote for the pimp") that swept Twitter, Facebook, and other social media platforms.

The Revolutionary Socialists issued a statement delineating their position toward the election which criticized state institutions supporting Sisi, described Sisi as the "leader of the counter-revolution," and vowed to "expose el-Sisi's illusions and to destroy the idol which Mubarak's state is erecting as it rebuilds itself." Six political movements, including the Road of the Revolution Front, both wings of the 6 April movement, the Revolutionary Socialists, Hakemhom, and the Students Resistance movement had joined together to create an anti-Sisi campaign called "Against You."

Two co-founders of Tamarod (Hassan Shahin and Mohamed Abel Aziz) were suspended from the organization after announcing their support for Hamdeen Sabahi in his presidential bid. Other leading Tamarod members, numbering around 50, issued a statement expressing support for Sabahi. The Revolution's Candidate campaign began to promote Sabahi following his confirmation that he will run in the election. The Popular Current officially supported Sabahi for president. The Constitution Party had announced its official support for Sabahi after polling its members over potential positions to take toward the election. The Socialist Popular Alliance Party announced on 25 April 2014 that it would support Sabahi. The Dignity Party previously stated that it would support Sabahi. The Revolutionary Socialists announced on 27 April that they would support Sabahi. The Justice Party declared its support for Sabahi on 28 April. The Freedom Egypt Party announced its support for Sabahi.

The Kefaya Movement stated it would not back a candidate. After holding an internal vote over the question of what position to take toward the presidential election, the Egyptian Social Democratic Party decided not to officially back any candidate. The 6 April Democratic Front had declared that it would let members decide whether to support Sabahi or boycott the election.

There was some notoriety over a supporter of Abdel Fattah el-Sisi, an Egyptian woman named Mona el-Beheiri, having expressed her dissent in a street interview over U.S. President Barack Obama's approach to el-Sisi and Egypt in broken English, sporting a heavy Egyptian Arabic accent: "Listen your Obama. We are Egyptian women. You are listen Obama!? Shut up your mouse Obama! Shut up your mouse Obama!! SISI YES, SISI YES! MORSI NO, MORSI NO!" el-Beheiri later became a well-known persona in Egypt and across the Arab world, and the video of her street interview became the subject of some remixes and memes. The incident was described as "the Middle East's Joe the Plumber moment". el-Beheiri received interviews from numerous Arab news outlets, and appeared on various talk shows. T-shirts with either her image or "Shut up your mouse, Obama" quote were being sold in stores and markets all over the Arab world. In addition, she was invited to the Arab Media Forum in Dubai, as an example of a social media phenomenon. Some took a very differing opinion and even considered the event and attention an embarrassment.

== Conduct and controversies ==
The Socialist Popular Alliance Party and the Revolutionary Socialists opposed the use of state media to promote el-Sisi as a candidate. The Socialist Popular Alliance also demanded "fair, transparent, credible elections" and argued that allowing the election to turn into a referendum over a single candidate would mean the establishment of a totalitarian state. Ahmed Douma, an activist and member of the Popular Current who was at the time imprisoned for allegedly violating an anti-protest law, called on Hamdeen Sabahi to withdraw his candidacy until the protest law was annulled and prisoners whose incarceration is justified by this law or otherwise associated with its application were freed. Sabahi and his campaign issued complaints of state bias, assaults and arbitrary arrests against pro-Sabahi campaigners, and destruction of candidate endorsement documents. Sabahi also accused Sisi's campaign of bribing citizens to garner endorsements, as well as having orchestrated prepaid arrangements to acquire endorsements. The Presidential Elections Committee stated that Sabahi broke election rules by announcing his campaign prematurely and that it would investigate the matter. In response to actions undertaken by governmental authorities during the course of the voting process, Sabahi withdrew his campaign representatives from polling stations, and described the election as "a seemingly non-democratic process that lacks a minimum amount of freedom of expression." The Sabahi campaign denounced the arrests of many of its members throughout the course of the voting process.

== Further boycotts ==
Ayman Nour and his Ghad El-Thawra Party announced its boycott on 9 February. The National Alliance to Support Legitimacy announced on 27 April 2014 that it would boycott the vote. The 6 April movement has announced that it would boycott the vote, describing the election as a "farce." The Strong Egypt Party re-affirmed that it would boycott the vote on 14 May.

== Monitors ==
The Presidential Electoral Committee approved 80 domestic and 6 international civil society organizations to monitor the elections while rejecting 32 domestic and seven international CSOs. Among the international organizations were the European Union, the African Union, the League of Arab States, the Common Market for Eastern and Southern Africa and Organisation internationale de la Francophonie The European Union monitored the election, as did Democracy International, though Democracy International withdrew after the second day of voting-the vote had been scheduled to last two days, but was extended to three after an initially low turnout. They commented that the extension raised "questions" regarding "independence of the election commission, the impartiality of the government, and the integrity of Egypt's electoral process". The European Union remained observing until the culmination of the voting. The Carter Center also sent a "small expert mission" focussed on general legal and political issues.

== Opinion polls ==
A September 2013 Zogby Research Services opinion poll found that 46% of Egyptians polled expressed "confidence" in Abdel-Fattah el-Sisi, while 52% were "not confident" in the then-general. The same poll showed 44% exhibiting "confidence" in former president Mohamed Morsi and 55% as being "not confident" about the former president. The Zogby poll reported 39% as "confident" in then-interim president Adly Mansour while 58% were "not confident" in him. A poll conducted by Baseera in February 2014 indicated that 51% of those polled would vote for el-Sisi, while 45% were undecided about whom to vote for and only 1% planned to cast their vote for Sabahi. 2,062 people were polled by the Egyptian Center for Public Opinion Research (Baseera) in all of the governorates of Egypt from 27 February 2014 to 4 March 2014 via mobile and landline calling. Another poll, also conducted by Baseera, indicated that 39% would vote for El-Sisi, while 59% were undecided and only 1% indicated that they would vote for Sabahi. The poll was conducted by contacting 2,034 people 18 and older who were contacted through land line and mobile phones throughout all of Egypt's governorates from 24 March until 26 March. Another poll taken from 28 April until 2 May indicated that 72% supported Sisi, while 2% support Sabahi. A poll by the Ibn Khaldun Center for Development Studies found that 84% of those who responded would support Sisi, while 16% would support Sabahi. Another poll by Baseera conducted from 10 to 11 May that polled 2,000 people found that 75% have said that they would vote for Sisi, 2% would vote for Sabahi and 15% were undecided. 87% of people who responded said that they would vote.

Opinion polls in Egypt are, however, unreliable, having failed to predict the outcome of the 2012 presidential election.

Poll source	Date(s) administered	Sample size	Hamdeen Sabahi Egyptian Popular Current	Abdel Fattah el-Sisi Non-partisan	None	Lead
Baseera	27 February – 4 March 2014	2,062	1%	51%	45%	50%
Baseera	24–26 March 2014	2,034	1%	39%	59%	38%
Baseera	28 April- 2 May 2014	2,005	2%	72%	26%	70%
Ibn Khaldun Center for Development Studies	approximately 2 May 2014	?	16%	84%	0%	68%
Baseera	10–11 May 2014	2,000	2%	76%	22%	74%

== Turnout ==
With the election looming, Sisi publicly called for record voter participation in an effort to boost the election's legitimacy. "Showing signs of panic," according to Reuters, the interim government declared the second day of voting, a Tuesday, to be a public holiday, and extended voting until 10:00PM. However, turnout was lower than expected, with lines outside polling stations short, and in some cases no voters visible at all. By the end of the day, the elections committee decided to extend voting to a third day, 28 May. The Justice Ministry declared that Egyptians who did not vote would be fined, and waived train fares to try to increase participation. Government-backed media also admonished the public for not voting, and one TV commentator called those not voting "traitors, traitors, traitors."

Turnout was very low in the city of Alexandria, in Morsi's home village northeast of Cairo, and in the industrial city of Helwan.

While some attribute the low turnout to earlier calls by the Muslim Brotherhood in Egypt to boycott the elections, others see it as a reflection of the popularity of Abdel Fattah el-Sisi.

== Results ==
=== Expats ===
The Presidential Elections Committee announced on 21 May that the final tally of votes by Egyptians at polling stations abroad in the presidential election had el-Sisi win with 94.5% of the votes (296,628 votes out of 318,033).

=== Exit polls ===
An exit poll from the Egyptian Centre for Public Opinion Research, Baseera, the primary institute to have polled the election campaign, showed el-Sisi in the lead with 95.3%, and Sabahi with 4.7%.

=== Unofficial results and reactions ===
Unofficial results that were reported in the news outlets showed that out of the Egyptian population eligible to vote of 54 million, only around half, 25.6 million voted. Of the 25.6 million, El-Sisi was voted for by 23.9 million, in comparison to Sabahi's 756,000, It was also reported that the number of votes Sabahi received was outnumbered by invalid votes (1.07 million). When the unofficial results were published, hundreds of El-Sisi supporters in Cairo celebrated.

A day after the election, Sabahi conceded defeat but said the official turnout figures were too high and were "an insult to the intelligence of Egyptians." The next day, he contested the results of the election, even before the official results were announced by the presidential election commission. The appeal was rejected by PEC the day after.

=== Official results ===
The official publication date for the results was due to be 5 June, in memory of the Six-Day War's beginning, in which Egypt was at war with Israel. However, the results were released early on 3 June by Judge Anwar El-Assi. He announced the following final official results: 25,578,233 voted in the elections, a turnout of 47.5%, with el-Sisi winning with 23.78 million votes, 96.91%. Hamdeen Sabahi got 757,511 of the votes, 3.09%.

Candidate	Party	Votes	%
Abdel Fattah el-Sisi	Independent	23,780,114	96.91
Hamdeen Sabahi	Egyptian Popular Current	757,511	3.09
Total		24,537,625	100.00
Valid votes		24,537,625	95.93
Invalid/blank votes		1,040,608	4.07
Total votes		25,578,233	100.00
Registered voters/turnout		53,848,890	47.50
Source: Ahram Online

== Reactions ==
=== Domestic ===
In conjunction with el-Sisi inauguration festivals held in Egypt's Supreme constitutional court, Heliopolis Palace and Quba palace, Tahrir Square was prepared for receiving millions of Egyptians to celebrate Sisi's winning while police and army troops shut down the square outlets by barbed wires and barricades, as well as electronic gates for detecting any explosives that could spoil the festivals.

Grand Imam of al-Azhar Ahmed el-Tayeb and the Pope Tawadros II sent a congratulation cable to el-Sisi. Egypt's top football clubs Al Ahly SC and Zamalek SC's board of directors also sent el-Sisi cables. The leading Egyptian journalist and author Mohamed Hassanein Heikal congratulated Sisi and expressed through his Twitter account his wishes for el-Sisi. The Egyptian Minister of Defense Sedki Sobhi in the name of the Egyptian Armed Forces congratulated el-Sisi.

Hamdeen Sabahi, who lost the election, called el-Sisi to congratulate him and wished him luck expressing his trust that he would succeed.

President Abdel Fattah el-Sisi, an hour after he was named the country's new leader, gave a television speech expressing his gratitude over the election results saying "My emotions are mixed with happiness and aspiration: my happiness for what you have achieved and my aspiration to be worthy of your trust,". Sisi also said that "now is the time for work", with the future goal being to realise the revolutions' goals of freedom, dignity, humanity and social justice. "I am looking forward to your efforts and determination in building the upcoming stage," he added.

=== International ===
- UN — The United Nations Secretary-General Ban Ki-moon congratulated el-Sisi, saying that he puts his faith in Egypt's president-elect and trusts that he will do everything possible to support the Egyptian people's aspirations for a "stable, democratic and prosperous Egypt."
- EU — The European Union extended congratulations to el-Sisi saying the conclusion of elections "marks an important step in the implementation of the constitutional roadmap towards the transition to democracy in Egypt".
- Arab League — The Arab Parliament speaker Ahmed Ben Mohamed Jarwan congratulated el-Sisi in a congratulatory cable wishing luck to the new leader to meet the expectations of the Egyptian people.
- Russia — Shortly after the initial results appeared, before the final results, president Vladimir Putin called el-Sisi to congratulate him in what he described as "convincing success", he also agreed to hold top official meetings and encourage mutual relations between the two countries in the forthcoming period. The Patriarch of Moscow and all Rus' Kirill also has congratulated el-Sisi on winning the election.
- United States — A White House statement from 4 June 2014 said the US "looks forward to working with Abdelfattah al-Sisi, the winner of Egypt's presidential election, to advance our strategic partnership and the many interests shared by the United States and Egypt."
- Saudi Arabia — King Abdullah ibn Abdilaziz sent a cable of congratulation Al-Sisi describing the day as a "historic day," and vowed to continue support for Egypt saying "In this day of history and in a new stage of the march of Egypt, a country of true Islam and Arabism, I have the pleasure to congratulate you on the kind confidence bestowed on you by the people who entrusted you to carry their hopes, aspirations and dreams for a better future," King Abdullah also called on countries to attend a donors conference for Egypt warning "any able country failing to contribute to help Egypt would have no future place among us."
- UAE — The Emirati president and Emir of Abu Dhabi, Khalifa bin Zayed Al Nahyan, sent el-Sisi a cable of congratulation saying: "Congratulations on the precious trust given to you by the brotherly people of Egypt in facing the challenges they are experiencing, and to achieve their aspirations and ambitions in stability, development, progress, prosperity, pride and dignity." Sharjah ruler Sultan bin Muhammad Al-Qasimi, Deputy ruler Ahmed bin Sultan Al-Qasimi, crown prince of Sharjah Sheikh Sultan Bin Muhammed Al-Qassimi, Sharjah debuty ruler Abdullah bin Salem Al-Qassimi also sent Sisi congratulation cables.
- Kuwait — The Kuwaiti government chaired by His Highness the Prime Minister Sheikh Jaber Mubarak Al-Hamad Al-Sabah congratulated el-Sisi and wished him luck in restoring security and stability nationwide, His Highness the Amir Al-Jaber Al-Sabah participated in Al-Sisi's inauguration ceremony in Cairo.
- Jordan — King Abdullah called el-Sisi to congratulate him, he also attended his inauguration in Cairo vowing more support to Egypt.
- Palestine — The Palestinian president Mahmoud Abbas called el-Sisi to congratulate him describing his victory as "a victory for the Arab and Palestinian cause".
- Israel — Both the Israeli president Shimon Peres and the prime minister Benjamin Netanyahu called el-Sisi to congratulate him, they described his win as "sweeping victory in a democratic transparent atmosphere", they also expressed their certainty that el-Sisi would take Egypt to the position it deserves based on his background as a fighter soldier and a great leader seeking his country's sublimity.
- Qatar — Qatar's emir Tamim bin Hamad Al Thani sent a cable to el-Sisi congratulating him.
- Turkey — The Turkish president Abdullah Gül sent el-Sisi a message congratulating him saying he had no doubts that the deep-rooted relations between Turkey and Egypt would continue, and sent his best wishes for the peace, stability and well-being of the Egyptian people. However, prime minister Erdogan dismissed the congratulatory message, saying such messages are "meaningless."
- Nigeria — The Nigerian president Goodluck Jonathan sent el-Sisi a cable congratulating him urging him to "fully dedicate himself to ending years of political turmoil in the north African country by working diligently for national reconciliation, peace, political stability and socioeconomic development,".
- Italy — The Italian foreign minister Federica Mogherini sent el-Sisi a cable congratulating him saying that Italy considers Egypt as a strategic partner to face common threats in the region.
- China — The Chinese president Xi Jinping has congratulated el-Sisi on his election as Egypt's new president saying that China is willing to make joint efforts with Egypt to further promote the traditional friendship between the two peoples, and to cement their mutually beneficial cooperation in various fields so as to advance the China-Egypt strategic cooperation.
- UK — British foreign secretary William Hague congratulated el-Sisi saying that Britain is looking forward to working with El-Sisi's government on strengthening the "broad and productive relationship between both our peoples."
- Syria — The Syrian president Bashar al-Assad sent el-Sisi a cable congratulating him.
- Algeria — The Algerian president Abdelaziz Bouteflika sent a cable addressing el-Sisi as Mr. President and "my dear brother" wishing him best of luck regarding his duty.
- Yemen — The Yemeni president Abd Rabbuh Mansur Hadi sent el-Sisi a cable wishing him the best of luck and expressing his sureness that Egypt led by el-Sisi would be supporter for the Arab cause.
- Sudan — The Sudanese president Omar al-Bashir called el-Sisi wishing him the best of luck for Egypt to restore the stability.
- Namibia — The Namibian president Hifikepunye Pohamba sent el-Sisi a cable wishing that electing him would restore stability and peace to Egypt.
- Morocco — The Moroccan king Mohammed sent el-Sisi a cable wishing him luck in his supreme mission.
- Libya — The president of General National Congress Nouri Abusahmain sent el-Sisi a cable wishing him luck and saying that he is looking forward to co-operate with Egypt for the ambition of Egyptians and Libyans.
- Oman — The Omani sultan Qaboos bin Said al Said sent el-Sisi a cable wishing him success in achieving Egyptians ambitions.
- Iraq — The Iraqi prime minister Nouri al-Maliki sent el-Sisi a cable hoping that electing el-Sisi would mark a first step towards restoring stability in Egypt.
- Lebanon — Acting president Tammam Salam sent el-Sisi a cable congratulating him.
- France — French foreign minister Laurent Fabius expressed his congratulations to el-Sisi in a phone call with the Egyptian Foreign minister Sameh Shoukry.
- Bolivia — The Minister of National Defense of Bolivia Rubén Saavedra Soto handed over a congratulation message for el-Sisi to Egyptian envoy to meetings of the G-77 Summit.
- Venezuela — The Venezuelan president Nicolás Maduro sent a cable congratulating el-Sisi and saying that he is looking forward to co-operating with Egypt to "strengthen the historical relations between the two countries".
- Japan — The Japanese emperor Akihito sent a cable congratulating el-Sisi expressing his wishes for el-Sisi to succeed
- Germany — The German president Joachim Gauck sent a congratulatory telegram to el-Sisi congratulating him on his inauguration as president, he also stressed on the outstanding role of president Sisi in uniting Egyptians together. He also affirmed on the importance of cooperation based on the partnership between Egypt and Germany.
- Singapore — The Singaporean president Tony Tan Keng Yam has written el-Sisi a congratulatory message offering "warmest congratulations". saying "Your assumption of office will mark the completion of an important phase of Egypt’s political transition," he wrote, in a letter released to the media on Friday (6 June). Dr Tan says Singapore stands ready to help, as Mr El-Sisi attempts to steer Egypt "back onto the path of stability and prosperity".
- Iran — The Iranian president Hassan Rouhani has congratulated el-Sisi, the Iranian Deputy Foreign Minister for Arab and African Affairs Amir Abdollahian attended the inauguration ceremony of el-Sisi in Cairo.
- Spain — Spain's government released a statement saying that it welcomes "the fact that the elections were held in a prevailing climate of calm" and it said that "Spain trusts that the mandate of President al-Sisi serves to make progress towards the true democratisation of the country, leads to a return to economic growth and the creation of opportunities for the people of Egypt and highlights the need for the consolidation of security and stability of the country."
- Bahrain — King Hamad bin Isa Al Khalifa sent a cable to el-Sisi wishing him success in assuming his presidential duties to meet his people's aspirations and ambitions, achieve further progress and prosperity and consolidate security and stability. "We are looking forward to attending your inauguration, fully confident in your ability to achieve stability, progress and prosperity and lead Egypt to assume its strategic and pivotal regional role in championing Arab and Islamic causes," he added.
- Tunisia — The major Tunisian opposition party Nidaa Tounes published two letters through its Facebook page, the first one congratulates the Egyptian people for electing el-Sisi, and the other for congratulating el-Sisi saying "Under your [Sisi’s] guidance and with your election, our sister Egypt inaugurates a new era of trust in the present and hope in the future,". the letter was signed by the party's leader Béji Caïd Essebsi
- Ethiopia — The Ethiopian president Mulatu Teshome sent a congratulatory message to el-Sisi stressing the historical ties of friendship between the two countries and looked forward to strengthening this relation the future. The Ethiopian foreign minister attended the inauguration of el-Sisi.
- Gambia — A Gambian official delegation headed by The Gambia's Secretary General and Minister for Presidential Affairs Momodou Sabally attended the ceremony of Sisi's inauguration in Cairo.
- The IMF managing Director Christine Lagarde congratulated el-Sisi in a cable his win in what she described as "elections in a fair atmosphere" wishing him the best of luck on his new charge.
