= Egyptian Current Party =

Egyptian Current Party حزب التيار المصري
- Leader: Mohamed El-Kassas; Ahmed Abd El-Gawad
- Founded: June 2011
- Merged into: Strong Egypt Party
- Ideology: Islamism
- Political position: Centre

The Egyptian Current Party (Arabic: حزب التيار المصري, romanized: Ḥizb al-Tayyār al-Maṣrī), also translated as Egyptian Stream Party, was an Egyptian political party, founded after the revolution of 2011. The party announced on 1 October 2014 that it had merged into the Strong Egypt Party.

It was formed by a portion of the Muslim Brotherhood's youth wing. Its leaders, including Mohamed El-Kassas and Ahmed Abd El-Gawad, were expelled from the Brotherhood, because the Islamist organisation does not tolerate its members joining political parties other than the official Freedom and Justice Party. Other members were part of the April 6 Movement. The party stood for a centrist and more liberal version of Islamic politics. At the time of its foundation on 21 June 2011, the Egyptian Current Party had 150 members.

According to its manifesto, the Egyptian Current Party advocated the separation of religion and state, the protection of individual freedoms, and a youth-driven economic development. It embraced Islamic culture and values without enforcing the religious law (Sharia).

Observers saw the formation of the new party against the background of the expulsion from the Brotherhood of Abdel Moneim Aboul Fotouh, a liberal Islamic presidential candidate with high popularity among the organised Islamic youth. Another disagreement which led to the division between the Muslim Brotherhood and the youth grouping concerned the Brotherhood's refusal to allow it to take part in "The Second Revolution" protests on Tahrir Square in May 2011.
