= Democratic Jihad Party =

Democratic Jihad Party حزب الجهاد الديمقراطي
- Leader: Yasser Saad
- Founder: Nabil Na'eem
- Founded: 2012
- Ideology: Islamism
- Political position: Centre

The Democratic Jihad Party was an Egyptian political party made up of former members of the group Egyptian Islamic Jihad; it was also made up of members of other "former jihadist groups". The party is also known as the Islamic Democratic Jihad Party, as well as the Islamist Jihadi Party. A member of the party has stated that the party has "failed". The party has stated that it supported Ahmed Shafiq in the 2012 presidential election; Sabra Ibrahim, a deputy founder in the party, stated that the party gave its support to Shafiq in order to prevent the establishment of a theocratic state ruled by the Muslim Brotherhood. The party condemned the attack in August 2012 that killed 16 soldiers, saying that it was committed by “sinful terrorist[s].” Yasser Saad is now a member of an umbrella coalition of former jihadis, ex-members of the Muslim Brotherhood and ex-al-Gama'a al-Islamiyya members called the Moderate Front.

== Policy ==
Sheikh Yasser Saad, the leader of the party, has stated that the party will be inclusive regarding minorities. A young female party member named Hanan Nouredin appeared unveiled at the press conference announcing the plan to found the party.

== Criticism ==
The party was criticized by Muhammad al-Zawahiri for embracing democracy.

== See also ==
- Islamic Party, another political party founded by former Egyptian Islamic Jihad members
