= Arabic Popular Movement =

Political party in Egypt

- House of Representatives: 0 / 568

The Arabic Popular Movement (also translated as the Arabian Popular Movement) is a political party in Egypt created by members of the Tamarod movement. The Supreme Electoral Commission announced on 3 December 2014 that it had declined the establishment of the party and referred the case to the Supreme Administrative Court to determine its status. The Supreme Administrative Court denied the party's appeal on 28 January 2015. Members of Tamarod will run as independents in the 2015 Egyptian parliamentary election.
