= Nabil Na'eem =

Egyptian Islamist (born 1956)

Nabil Naeem
- Born: Nabeel Naeem Abdul Fattah; 1956 (age 69–70); Cairo, Egypt
- Education: Cairo University
- Political party: Democratic Jihad Party; Egyptian Islamic Jihad (1988–1992)

Nabeel Naeem Abdul Fattah (Arabic: نبيل نعيم عبد الفتاح) is the founder of the Democratic Jihad Party as well as a contributor to Asharq Al-Awsat. He was also the leader of Egyptian Islamic Jihad from 1988 until 1992.

He was arrested by Egypt in 1991 and not released until the 2011 Egyptian revolution. He and Ismail Nasr wrote up a document abandoning violence towards the state, though it did not gain much support, partly because he was not theologically qualified. The revisions of Sayyid Imam al-Sharif were more widely accepted among members of Egyptian Islamic Jihad.

== Criticism of the Muslim Brotherhood ==
He also backed the protests started by Tamarod that led to the 2013 Egyptian coup. Naeem stated in an interview that the Muslim Brotherhood should be overthrown by the military. He has also stated that the Muslim Brotherhood "used Islam as a tool of repression." In his criticism stated in May 2013, he has called the Muslim Brotherhood a "dictatorial organization." In a news conference held by the Association for Victims of the Muslim Brotherhood Regime on 28 September, Na'eem called Mohamed Morsi a "traitor."
