= Soldiers of Egypt =

Egyptian Islamist Militant Group

- Ajnad Misr
- Leaders: Humam Muhammed †; Ezz al-Din al-Masri (POW)
- Dates active: 20 November 2013–10 October 2017
- Active regions: Cairo, Egypt
- Ideology: Salafist jihadism

Soldiers of Egypt (Arabic: أجناد مصر, romanized: Ajnad Misr) was a Salafist Islamist militant group that operated near Cairo, Egypt. The group was founded by Humam Muhammed in 2013, after he split away from the Ansar Bait al-Maqdis militant group. The group claimed that its attacks were "retribution" for the August 2013 Rabaa Massacre; notably, the group targeted only security forces. It warned civilians of the presence of bombs that it placed.

The Cairo Court for Urgent Matters declared the group a terrorist group on 22 May 2014. It was a Proscribed Organisation in the United Kingdom under the Terrorism Act 2000 since 28 November 2014. The United States Department of State designated it a terrorist organization on 18 December 2014.

On April 5 of 2015, Hammam Mohamed Attiyah, founder of Ajnad Misr was killed during a raid in Cairo. The group confirmed that been succeeded by Ezz al-Din al-Masry.

== Attacks ==
=== 2014 ===
- The group claimed responsibility for an attack that occurred on 24 January 2014 that ultimately killed four policeman and wounding 100 people, Ansar Bait al-Maqdis indicated that Soldiers of Egypt had executed one of the bombings, despite the fact that Ansar Bait al-Maqdis initially claimed responsibility for all of the bombings.
- 31 January; An explosive device blast against a vehicle with Central Security Forces (CSF) officers, wounding one. In the same day a double attack against a CSF camp in Giza Governorate left one officer wounded.
- The group claimed responsibility for two bombings that occurred on 7 February 2014, which left six officers of the Egyptian National Police (ENP) wounded.
- The group claimed to have killed one policemen and injured eight people in a 13 February 2015 bombing near a police station in Ain Shams.
- The group exploded a bomb in 6th of October City on 5 March 2014.
- The group targeted a police car parked near the Israeli embassy in Cairo on 11 March 2014.
- The group placed a bomb in Nasr City on 29 March 2014.
- 2 April: One civilian and one police general was killed and four people were wounded in a coordinate quadruple bombing at Cairo University in Giza.
- 10 April: A militant threw an explosive device under the vehicle of a police captain, detonating and wounding the officer, in 6th of October, Giza. In the same day, and explosive device blasts in El-Houssari Square, without leaving victims.
- 15 April: Two policemen and a civilian wounded by a bomb in Giza.
- 18 April; One police officer was killed and other wounded by the group in Lebanon Square area, Mohandessin.
- 23 April: The group killed the Brigadier General Ahmed Zaki of the Central Security Forces in 6th of October, Giza.
- 30 June: A quadruple coordinate bombing in the Ittihadiya Palace in Heliopolis district, Cairo. The blasts kill two officers and wound other 10.
- 21 September: An improvised device near an Egyptian National Police (ENP) checkpoint in Boulaq Abu El-Ela neighborhood, Cairo, killing two police and wound 6 six more.
- 14 October: A bomb blasts near a metro station and the High Court of Justice on Ramses Street in Cairo, left 13 civilians wounded.
- 22 October: The group claimed responsibility for a bombing that occurred on 22 October 2014 near Cairo University that injured 11 people.
- 20 November; Militants threw an explosive device that detonated near an ENP checkpoint in Helwan (near Helwan University), Cairo, leaving five officers wounded.
- The group injured four policemen in a bombing that occurred on 5 December 2014 near Ain Shams University.

=== 2015 ===
- The group killed one policeman and injured three civilians in a January 2015 bombing in the Talbia district of Giza.
- 22 January: An assailant threw an explosive device at the presidential palace in Misr Al Gadida, Cairo, leaving an officer wounded.
- 23 January; A bomb blasts Alf Maskan neighborhood, Cairo, left four officers and a civilian wounded. Two days later, a double attack in an anniversary of the Egyptian revolution left three officers wounded in Cairo.
- 13 February; an improvised device blasts killed one policeman and injured seven policemen and a civilian in Ain Shams neighborhood, Cairo.
- 28 March; An improvised device blasts in a metro station near Cairo University, leaving four officers and four civilians wounded.
- 5 April: The group claimed responsibility for a bombing in an ENP Checkpoint in Zamalek that killed one officer and wound three more. Ajnad Misr claimed the attack
- 13 April; Explosive devices blasts against a Transmission tower, in 6th of October city, Giza, leaving serious damage to the electric infrastructure.
- 16 July: An explosive device blasts in front of a building in Roxy Square, Heliopolis, leaving one officer wounded.
- 10 August; An improvised device blasts at a traffic sentry post near a courthouse in Cairo, killing a police captain and wounding three more.
