= January 2014 Cairo bombings =

Terrorist incident in Egypt

- Part of Post-coup unrest in Egypt
- Location: Cairo, Egypt
- Date: 24 and 25 January 2014; First and largest explosion at 06:30 local time
- Attack type: Bombings
- Weapons: Bomb, truck bomb, firearms
- Deaths: 7 (4 at police headquarters; 2 at Metro (Dokki); 1 at cinema (Giza))
- Injuries: 100+

On 24 and 25 January 2014, a series of bombs exploded in Greater Cairo. The first four explosions occurred on the day before the anniversary of the Egyptian Revolution of 2011, with the fifth coming on the anniversary itself.

== 24 January ==
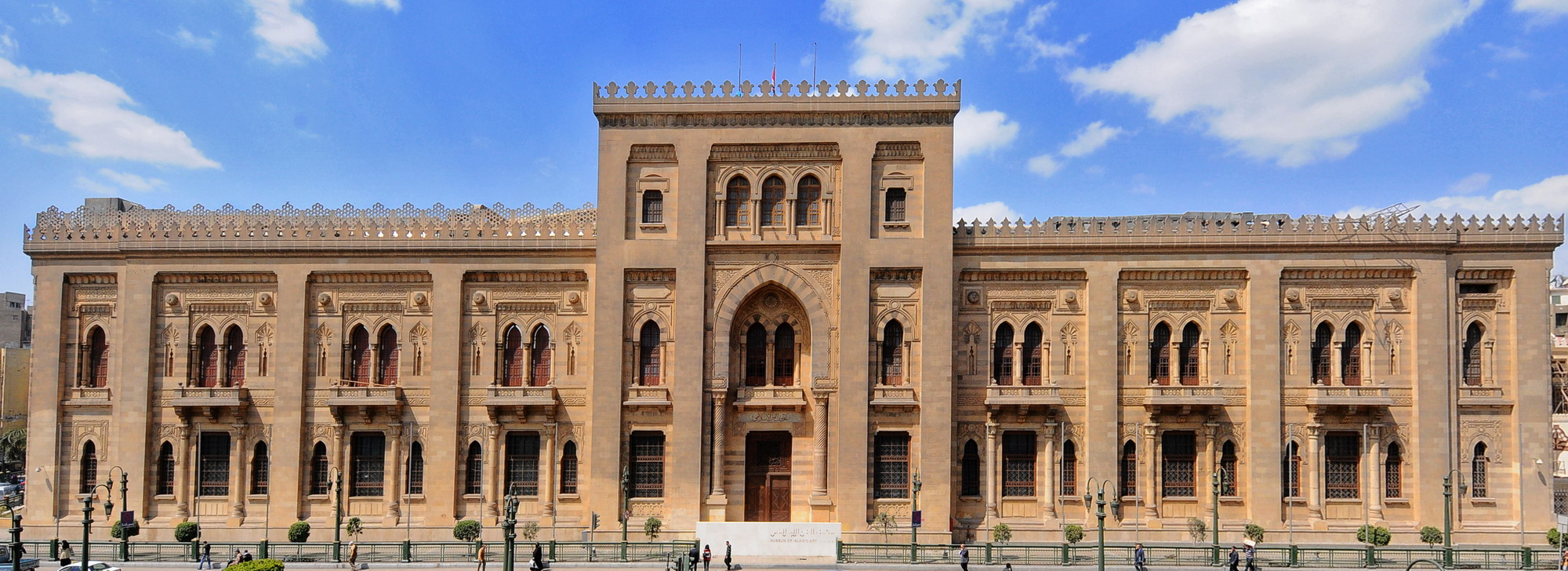
The Museum of Islamic Art, Cairo, which was badly damaged in the first explosion

=== Police headquarters ===
The first was at the police headquarters in Cairo, Egypt, which were attacked with a large truck bomb just after 06:30 local time. CCTV caught a white truck stop at 06:29 outside the building, with the driver jumping into another car. The blast could be heard across the city, and gunfire was heard after the explosion. At least five people were killed and 75 injured. The front of the multi-storey building was badly damaged, as were the National Archives building and the Museum of Islamic Art, whose collection was severely damaged. Irina Bokova, Unesco's director-general, said: "This raises the danger of irreversible damage to the history and identity of the Egyptian people." After the explosion a large crowd gathered, some of whom sang chants against the Muslim Brotherhood, including ""The people demand the execution of the Brotherhood."

=== Other bombs ===
Three more bombs exploded in western Cairo: the first was near the Behoos Metro Station in the Dokki district (two people killed), the second was at a police station near the Giza pyramids (no casualties), and the third at the Radobis cinema in Giza (one person killed).

== 25 January ==
On 25 January another bomb exploded at 07:00 local time in the Ein Shams district of eastern Cairo but there were no casualties.

== Claims of responsibility ==
Ansar Bait al-Maqdis, a group affiliated to Al-Qaeda, claimed responsibility for all the bombings, saying in a statement, "We tell our dear nation that these attacks were only the first drops of rain, so wait for what is coming up." A group called Soldiers of Egypt took responsibility for the blast near the metro station.

== International reactions ==
- European Union – The EU High Representative for foreign affairs and security policy, Catherine Ashton, condemned the bomb attacks in Egypt and urged Egyptians to keep their unity.
- Iran – Iran condemned the bombings and called on Egyptians to keep their national unity.
- Russia – Russia’s Foreign Ministry condemned the bombings and released a statement saying: "As for the events in Cairo, we reiterate our principal position of firm condemnation of all terrorist acts, including those directed against administrative facilities, no matter what motives the organizers and perpetrators declare, solidarity with the Egyptian authorities’ policies, aimed at stabilizing of the situation in the country and promotion of the reformations course basing on results of the January all-nation referendum on the new draft constitution."
- Saudi Arabia – Saudi Arabia condemned the bombings, saying that the bombings were committed by a "criminal group that seeks to break up the unity of Egypt".
- United Arab Emirates – The United Arab Emirates condemned the bombings and urged countries that oppose extremism to stand by the Egyptian government.
- United States – The United States strongly condemned the bombings and called for calm. A White House spokesperson said: "These crimes should be investigated fully and the perpetrators should be brought to justice."
