= Taharor =

- Founded: 29 March 2014
- Type: Pressure group
- Key people: Mohamed Fawzy

Taharor, also known as Tamarod 2, is an Egyptian movement that split from Tamarod. Taharor split from Tamarod because it believes that Tamarod ignores police brutality and excessive force and is too closely aligned with the Egyptian state. The movement coordinated with the Constitution Party and the April 6 Youth Movement to ask Mohamed ElBaradei to run for president in the 2014 presidential election. Taharor sought to collect 50,000 signatures in favor of ElBaradei; twice the required minimum of 25,000 signatures for eligibility to run. The organization was thinking of forming a political party and running in the 2015 parliamentary election.
