= Moderate Front =

- Founder: Sabra al-Qasmy
- Founded: 2013

The Moderate Front (also called the Moderate Islamist Front for Combating Violence and Extremism, the Islamic Alliance to Support Stability and Renounce Violence and the Movement of Moderation to Confront the Religious Extremism) is an alliance composed of former jihadis, ex-members of the Muslim Brotherhood and ex-al-Gama'a al-Islamiyya members. The leader of the alliance is Sabra al-Qasemy al-Wasateyya, who was a former member of Egyptian Islamic Jihad. The alliance was founded after the 30 June ouster of Mohamed Morsi and subsequent attacks on civilians. The coalition has supported Abdel Fattah el-Sisi for president in the Egyptian 2014 presidential election. The Muslim Brotherhood has been criticized by the group for its calling for protests on the anniversary of the Mohamed Mahmoud clashes; the members of the alliance want the Brotherhood to turn away from violence. One of the members of the organization, Amr Emara, is also the coordinator of the Dissident Brotherhood Youth Alliance. The leader of the Democratic Jihad Party (Yasser Saad) is currently a member of the front.

The organization worked on a book to combat takfir ideology; the book was published in October 2013 and distributed in Arish.
