= Kamal Habib =

Egyptian Islamist

Dr Kamal Habib is an Egyptian political analyst, political science professor and a member of the Supreme Council of Journalism in Egypt. He is a regular public commentator, often hosted on radio and television programs and writes a regular column in Al-Youm al-Sabaa newspaper. He is also a former member of Egyptian Islamic Jihad.

He is academic professor in the field of social movements and Islam, and is often called upon in media debates to analyse the role of Islamist movements and groups. He completed his master's degree in political science, and in 2006 completed his Doctorate degree in political science from Cairo University, examining political parties and Islam in Turkey.

== Controversy ==
In an interview with Al-Jazeera TV, Dr. Habib indicated his belief that an American-led Zionist State would create the same fate of many past Jews who suffered in the West. "...Jews, or non-Muslims, have always lived in Islamic countries, and these Islamic countries treated them in the best possible way. So where does the problem lie? The Jews today... or rather, the Americans... What I want to say is that the curricula are not the problem, nor are the students who graduate after using them. The problem lies in the reality of our life. The problem is that there is a Zionist plan, a plan for a Zionist state, which aims at changing the nature of the region and at turning Muslims into the victims of what was done to the Jews in the West."
