= Mahmoud Badr =

Egyptian journalist

Mahmoud Badr (Arabic: محمود بدر; born 1985) is an Egyptian activist and journalist. He co-founded the Tamarod ("Rebel") movement and serves as its official spokesman and one of its principal leaders. Tamarod claimed to have gathered millions of signatures, that were never independently verified, demanding the resignation of Egyptian president Mohamed Morsi, and organized mass protests which preceded the 2013 Egyptian coup d'état removing Morsi from power. Recent audio tapes secretly recorded in the offices of the deputy ministers to Al-Sisi – and authenticated by independent expert analysis from France – establish the movement as an arm of the military coup. Senior officials of the coup are heard on the tapes bragging about how good they were at falsifying evidence against Morsi, at forgery and at torture. The list of plotters included Deputy Defense Minister Mamdouh Shaheen and Gen. Abbas Kamel, the chief of staff to Gen. Abdel Fattah el-Sisi, the top military commander regarded as the mastermind behind the coup.

Badr has a career in journalism and broadcast media production. He began his political activism during the presidency of Hosni Mubarak, serving as a coordinator of the grassroots opposition movement, Kefaya ("Enough"), which was founded in 2004. He was also a member of the opposition National Association for Change (NAC) headed by Mohamed ElBaradei. Mubarak was overthrown during the 2011 Egyptian Revolution. Prior to 2013, Badr was not among the prominent figures in the revolutionary movement.

== Tamarod movement ==
In 2013, Badr and four other activists who founded the Tamarod movement organized a campaign with the aim of gathering over 15 million signatures petitioning President Morsi to leave office and call for early presidential elections. The 15 million signatures goal was meant to defeat the roughly 13 million votes Morsi received during the 2012 presidential elections. After Tamarod claimed it surpassed its target number of signatures, protests to demand Morsi's resignation were planned for 30 June. On 29 June, Badr claimed that Tamarod gathered 22,134,465 signatures. The number claim was never verified by an independent source, especially the rise in number by millions in a very short number of days. Many admitted to signing the same form up to 20 times.

The mass demonstrations that were launched on 30 June were followed by the military's intervention on 3 July, ousting Morsi and suspending the constitution. Badr was among the figures who flanked army chief General Abdul Fatah al-Sisi when the latter announced Morsi's removal from power. Prior to al-Sisi's announcement, Badr, Ahmed el-Tayeb of al-Azhar Mosque, Coptic Pope Tawadros and others were invited to meet with military officials to find a solution to end the nationwide unrest. When al-Sisi suggested to Badr that Tamarod make a compromise and allow for a referendum to be held on whether or not Morsi should be allowed to continue his term, Badr rejected the proposal, stating "I tell you, sir, you may be the general commander of the Egyptian army but the Egyptian people are your supreme commander, and they are immediately ordering you to side with their will and call an early presidential election."

Badr publicly praised the August 2013 Rabaa massacre of pro-Morsi protest camps by military and police that led to hundreds of casualties. He also called for the creation of anti-Muslim Brotherhood militia.
