= Tamarod =

Early 2010s political movement in Egypt against President Mohamed Morsi

Tamarod (Arabic: تمرد, romanized: tamarrud, lit. 'rebellion') was an Egyptian movement funded by the General Intelligence Service (Mukhabarat) and UAE to overthrow the first democratically elected Egyptian president Mohamed Morsi. The nominal aim was to register opposition to and force him to call early presidential elections. The goal was to collect 15 million signatures by 30 June 2013, the one-year anniversary of Morsi's inauguration. On 29 June 2013 the movement claimed to have collected more than 22 million signatures (22,134,460). A counter campaign was launched in support of Morsi's presidency which claimed to have collected 11 million signatures. The movement was planning to become a political party following the 2014 Egyptian presidential election.

The movement helped launch the June 2013 Egyptian protests which was part of the 2013 Egyptian coup d'état.

== History ==
The Rebel movement was founded by five activists, including its official spokesman Mahmoud Badr, on 28 April 2013. An opposition group within the organization—initially named Tamarod 2 Get Liberated—argued that Tamarod was only able to collect 8.5 million signatures and that some of its founders were trained by security services. A report by Reuters alleged that police officers and officials from the Ministry of the Interior signed and helped distribute and collect signatures for the petition, as well as attending demonstrations themselves.

Members of the movement stated that they would support appointing Maher el-Beheiry, the former head of the Supreme Constitutional Court, to temporarily replace Morsi if he were to step down. The movement gave Morsi until 2 July 2013 to step down; if he did not step down, a civil disobedience campaign was to be initiated.

On 2 July 2013, the Salafist Call and its political wing, the Salafist Nour Party, stated that it had three main demands: a snap presidential poll should take place, a technocratic government should be formed and a committee should be formed to examine constitutional amendments.

The Egyptian armed forces gave both sides until 3 July 2013 to defuse the crisis. At that point, the armed forces said it would offer a "road map", though they stated that they would not get involved in politics or the government. Subsequently, the armed forces removed Morsi and replaced him with Adly Mahmoud Mansour, who had recently succeeded Maher el-Beheiry as head of the Supreme Constitutional Court.

=== Supporters of Tamarod ===
Among the political forces that initially announced support for the Rebel movement were Shayfeencom, the Kefaya Movement, the National Salvation Front and the April 6 Youth Movement. Nabil Na'eem, a former leader of Egyptian Islamic Jihad, stated that he would take part in the protests. The Strong Egypt Party stated that it supported the movement and called for early presidential elections.

The movement also accepted an endorsement by Ahmed Shafik. Mohamed El Baradei, one of the leaders of the National Salvation Front, stated that former members of the National Democratic Party would be welcomed as long as they were not convicted of any crimes.

=== Opposition to Tamarod ===
Supporters of President Morsi from the Muslim Brotherhood and other Islamist organizations launched two campaigns called Mu'ayyed (supporter) and Tagarrod (impartiality) in response to the Rebel movement petitions and started collecting signatures to support the continuation of Morsi's rule. The Tagarrod campaign stated that it had 11 million signatures by 20 June 2013.

Some Morsi supporters criticised the Rebel movement by claiming that it is "a manipulation of the will of the people and only serves counter-revolutionary forces supported by the remnants of the Mubarak regime".

== Role following the military coup ==
The Tamarod campaign strongly supported the military's toppling of Morsi, the military transition government, the security force raids that involved the killing of hundreds of Brotherhood members and the jailing of thousands of rank and file. Mahmoud Badr and another Tamarod founder, Mohamed Abdel Aziz, were appointed to the post-coup fifty-member committee redrafting Egypt's Constitution.

In the aftermath of the military coup in Egypt, defence minister General Abdul Fattah al-Sisi called for mass demonstrations on 26 July 2013, to grant his forces a "mandate" to crack down on "terrorism". While this announcement was rejected by Egyptian human rights groups and by many of the political movements that had initially supported the military coup, such as the revolutionary April 6 Youth Movement and the moderate Strong Egypt Party, Tamarod sided with General Sisi and called on their supporters to participate in the demonstrations. Mohamed Khamis, a leading Tamarod activist, said: "We support it, we will go out on the streets on Friday, and ask the army and the police to go and end this terrorism."

On 14 August 2013, following the August 2013 Rabaa massacre by security forces of supporters of deposed president Mohamed Morsi, in which hundreds of protestors were killed, Tamarod criticized Vice-President Mohamed ElBaradei for his decision to resign in protest against the crackdown.

On 15 August, Tamarod released a statement on state television calling on all Egyptians to form neighbourhood watches, in anticipation of plans by supporters of former president Mohamed Morsi to organise nationwide marches in protest against the violent dispersal of their sit-ins. Founder and spokesperson Mahmoud Badr said: "Just as you met our calls to take to the streets on 30 June, today we ask you to meet our calls and form neighbourhood watches tomorrow. Our country is facing huge threats." While this call was supported by the National Salvation Front, it was rejected by the Strong Egypt Party and by the April 6 Youth Movement, which called it irresponsible and warned that it could lead towards civil war.

Tamarod's indiscriminate support for the Egyptian military has been criticised by some liberal activists and media, with Mada Masr's Sarah Carr calling them the "Tamarod (Rebel) battalion of the Egyptian army". Tamarod has also supported the police.

On 8 October 2013, the group announced that it would run in the 2015 parliamentary election. Tamarod formed and tried to officially register a political party called the Arabic Popular Movement.

In early 2014, some leaders of the movement broke away and formed a splinter group, known as Tamarud 2 Get Liberated, in response to the authoritarianism of the post-coup military backed government. Members of the breakaway faction have claimed that some of the founders of the Tamarod movement were agents of state security forces. The organization, named Taharor, has stated that it believes that the Tamarod movement ignores police brutality. The group was critical of the April 6 Youth Movement following the banning of the youth movement; Tamarod spokesman Mohamed Nabawy stated that the ruling of the Egyptian judiciary was based on "evidence".

=== Foreign involvement ===
Leaked tapes from the summer of 2013 that were later verified by J. P. French Associates recorded figures of the Egyptian military, including former General Abdel Fattah el-Sisi, suggesting that the Egyptian military was involved in the mass-protests preceding Morsi's ouster. In one of the leaked tapes, the generals are heard discussing rigging the legal case against Morsi, and in another, authorizing the withdrawal of a large sum of money for the army's use from the bank account of Tamarod, as the ostensibly independent grassroots group was organizing protests against President Morsi at the time. The tapes also suggest high-level collusion between the coup plotters and the Government of the United Arab Emirates as the money that was to be transferred from Tamarod's account into the army's account was provided by the UAE. The tapes were first released on the Qatari-owned Egyptian Islamist channel Mekameleen, a fact that the Egyptian government says discredits the tapes as fakes. American officials later confirmed that the United Arab Emirates was indeed providing financial support for the protests against Morsi that preceded the military coup. There is also evidence on the support of the military coup plotters by the Egyptian economic elites. Egypt's Interior Ministry was seen as most influential in the lead-up to the coup d’état as a revenge for powers lost during the Egyptian revolution of 2011 according to a Reuters analysis.

=== Campaign against the US ===
Tamarod Facebook cover photo

Following efforts by the US administration to mediate reconciliation between the post-coup government and the Muslim Brotherhood and Western criticism of the violent dispersal of sit-ins by supporters of deposed president Morsi, Tamarod sharply criticised the United States and President Obama. In an interview, Tamarod co-founder Mahmoud Badr said: "I tell you, President Obama, why don't you and your small, meaningless aid go to hell?"

Tamarod launched a campaign to refuse US aid in all its forms and to cancel the peace agreement "between Egypt and the Israeli entity" and called for rallies in support of the Egyptian government against "foreign intervention."

In August 2013, Tamarod expressed its anti-US attitude by choosing the picture of a burning American flag as cover photo of its Facebook page.

=== Support for the Syrian government ===
In August 2013, when several Western countries were discussing military strikes against the Syrian government of Bashar al-Assad following an alleged chemical weapons attack in the Ghouta region on 21 August, which resulted in the deaths of hundreds of civilians, Tamarod released a statement saying that "it is a national duty to support the Syrian army" and denounced "people who betray their country". In the statement, Tamarod also called on the Egyptian government to close the Suez Canal to any vessel supporting military action against Syria.
