= Strong Egypt Party =

Political party in Egypt

Strong Egypt Party حزب مصر القوية
- Leader: Abdel Moneim Aboul Fotouh
- Spokesperson: Ahmed Imam; Mohammed El-Qassas
- Founded: 5 July 2012
- Preceded by: Egyptian Current Party
- Political position: Center
- National affiliation: Third Square; Road of the Revolution Front
- House of Representatives: 0 / 568

The Strong Egypt Party (Arabic: حزب مصر القوية, romanized: Hizb Misr al-Qawia) is an Egyptian centrist political party founded in 2012 by former presidential candidate Abdel Moneim Aboul Fotouh.

== History ==
The Strong Egypt Party was established in July 2012 by former Muslim Brotherhood member and 2012 presidential candidate Abdel Moneim Aboul Fotouh. On 31 October 2012, the party was officially inaugurated by Aboul Fotouh and co-founders Mokhtar Nouh and Rabab El-Mahdi in front of hundreds of supporters at the Supreme Court in Cairo.

On 10 December 2012, Aboul Fotouh announced that the party is calling on Egyptians to vote "no" in the 2012 constitutional referendum. In a videotaped statement, he said that there were three main reasons why Egyptians should reject the draft: first, a weakness in achieving social justice, second, the special status given to the military establishment and the provision for military trials of civilians, and third, the almost unchanged authorities of the president.

On 3 December 2013, the party announced that it will oppose the constitution that will be voted on in the 2014 constitutional referendum. In a press statement, party leader Aboul Fotouh said that the party rejected the draft for the same reasons as the 2012 constitution: it failed to promote social justice and gave too much power to the president. He asserted that the draft did not fulfill the goals of the Egyptian Revolution of 2011, and he also criticised that it made the military "a state above the state". A court case was brought forth to dissolve the party, though the Alexandria Urgent Matters Court ruled on 26 November 2014 that it lacked jurisdiction.

The Strong Egypt Party boycotted the parliamentary elections on 17 October 2015.

== Basic tenets ==
The party describes itself as an economically progressive and socially moderate political group. However, it does not endorse the politics of international loans, believing that it is not the solution to the economic problems of Egypt.

== Cooperation with other parties and movements ==
In July 2013, following the military coup against President Morsi, members of the Strong Egypt Party participated in the Third Square movement, which was created by liberal, leftist and moderate Islamist activists who reject both the Muslim Brotherhood and military rule.

In September 2013, members of the party were amongst the founders of the Road of the Revolution Front, an alliance of activists from different political backgrounds that aims to achieve the goals of the Egyptian Revolution of 2011 of bread, freedom and social justice.

== Lawsuit against Islamic parties ==
The Strong Egypt Party is one of the eleven Islamic parties targeted by a lawsuit in November 2014, when an organization named Popular Front for opposing the Brotherhoodization of Egypt sought to dissolve all political parties established "on a religious basis." The Alexandria Urgent Matters Court however ruled on 26 November 2014 that it lacked jurisdiction.

== See also ==
- Anti-Coup Alliance
- Tamarod
- Revolutionary Socialists
- April 6 Youth Movement
- Kefaya
