= Abdel Moneim Aboul Fotouh =

Egyptian physician and politician (born 1951)

- عبد المنعم أبو الفتوح
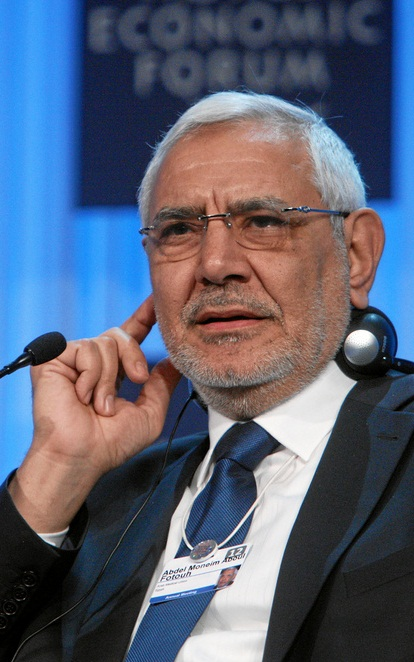
- Aboul Fotouh during the WEF 2012

Secretary General of the Arab Medical Union
- Incumbent
- Assumed office 2004

Personal details
- Born: Abdel Moneim Aboul Fotouh Abdel Hady; 15 October 1951 (age 74) Cairo, Egypt
- Party: Strong Egypt (2012–present)
- Spouse: Alia Khalil Haram
- Children: Yosra, Alaa'
- Education: Cairo University

Abdel Moneim Aboul Fotouh Abdel Hady (Arabic: عبد المنعم أبو الفتوح عبد الهادي, pronounced [ʕæbdelˈmenʕem abu lfʊˈtuːħ ʕæbdelˈhæːdi] or [ʕæbdelˈmonʕem]; born 15 October 1951) is an Egyptian physician, former student activist and politician. In 2011–2012, he ran for president of Egypt as an independent. He was formerly a leader of the Muslim Brotherhood in Egypt.

He is known for his staunch opposition to the Sadat and Mubarak regimes as well as his openness towards people of different political ideologies, a subject of controversy among some supporters of Egyptian Islamist movements. Affiliated with the Muslim Brotherhood since the early 1970s, Abou al-Fotouh had been a member of the Brotherhood's Guidance Bureau from 1987 until 2009. In 2011, he formally quit all political work with the Muslim Brotherhood and resigned from its membership, following his decision to run for president in the presidential election in 2012. He is currently the secretary-general of the Arab Medical Union. He was arrested on 14 February 2018 upon his return from London following an interview he gave to Al Jazeera in which he criticised the rule of Abdel Fattah el-Sisi.

== Early life ==
Abou al-Fotouh was born in the old Cairo district to a family which was originally from the Gharbia Governorate. He graduated from Cairo University's School of Medicine with honors in 1975 and received a bachelor's degree in law from the same university. He went on to attain a master's degree in hospital management from the Helwan University's Faculty of Commerce.

During his time at university, Abou al-Fotouh was the president of the student union at the College of Medicine at Qasr Aini in 1973 and then became the president of the student union of Cairo University in 1975, as well as the secretary of the Media Committee for all Egyptian Universities. While president of the student union at Cairo University, Abou al-Fotouh famously debated with Anwar Sadat. Abou al-Fotouh called Sadat's close followers a bunch of hypocrites, citing Sadat's restriction on Sheikh Mohammed al-Ghazali's speeches and the arrests of student demonstrators on campus. Sadat was angered and ordered Aboul Fotouh to stop in the middle of the debate, demanding that Aboul Fotouh should show respect for him.

== Political career ==
=== Al-Gama'a al-Islamiyya ===
Fotouh helped found al-Gama'a al-Islamiyya in the 1970s. When he was criticized by Amr Moussa in the 2012 presidential debate for belonging to the organization, he responded by saying that it was a "peaceful movement" at the time.

=== Muslim Brotherhood ===
Fotouh was a prominent student leader in the 1970s and coordinated with other students, including Essam al-Eryan and Ibrahim El Zafarany, to facilitate the entry of the many small Islamic organizations into the Muslim Brotherhood. For many years, he was a member of the Muslim Brotherhood and served on its Guidance Bureau. He was called "one of the Brotherhood's most respected members" but he quit its Guidance Bureau in 2009 then quit the Muslim Brotherhood in 2011.

=== Debate with President Sadat ===
When he was the head of Cairo University's student union, Abou al-Fotouh had a discussion with President Anwar Sadat. He accused Sadat and those who were working with him of being 'brown-nosers' because they banned Mohammed al-Ghazali from speaking in public.

=== Imprisonment ===
Abou al-Fotouh was arrested in 1981 in the famous September arrests that targeted members of Islamic groups in large numbers. He was then tried in a military court for the members of the Muslim Brotherhood. He was imprisoned for five years, from 1996 to 2001. He had been working as the aide to the secretary-general of the Arab Medical Union before his imprisonment, and after his release, he became secretary-general of the same organization. He was sentenced for 15 years as of 29 March 2022 due to his criticism of the current Egyptian government. His son wrote: "My father, after 7 years of solitary confinement and isolation, is being investigated for things he apparently did while being in a 2x3m cell isolated from the outside world. And the prosecution's decision is to detain him for 15 days, starting after he finishes his 15-year sentence in 2033! Could the honorable gentlemen responsible for my father's imprisonment, who is 74 years old, close the cell window with tarpaulin because it is cold outside?"

=== Presidential campaign ===
In 2011, after the Egyptian Revolution, Abou al-Fotouh announced that he would be running for the Presidency of Egypt. That was welcomed among some political forces, but it was met with dissent among the Muslim Brotherhood; as the organization had previously stated that they would not be putting forth a candidate for the coming presidential election, the decision "hardened the resentment of the Brotherhood's youth who saw Fotouh as their mentor." In late December 2011, Mohamed Morsy, president of the Freedom and Justice Party, stated that "the party will not endorse any presidential candidate that left the MB even if he was once a leading member in the organization or even if his ideals are similar to those of the MB." He was, of course, making an indirect reference to Abou al-Fotouh. He then reiterated that "the FJP will not introduce a presidential candidate, but is rather seeking one to support."

Aboul Fotouh has attempted to build a broad base of support. Fotouh was officially endorsed by the Salafi Al-Nour Party on 28 April 2012.

He initiated the Strong Egypt Party after losing the 2012 presidential election.

== Positions ==
Known for liberal Islamist views, as a leader within the Muslim Brotherhood, and a stress of social justice, Abou al-Fotouh claims to have worked to ensure that the ideas of the Muslim Brotherhood conformed with democratic principles. He declared on the BBC that the source of true power and legislation was not in a law or constitution but in the people.
