= Essam el-Erian =

Egyptian physician and politician (1954–2020)

Essam el-Erian عصام العريان
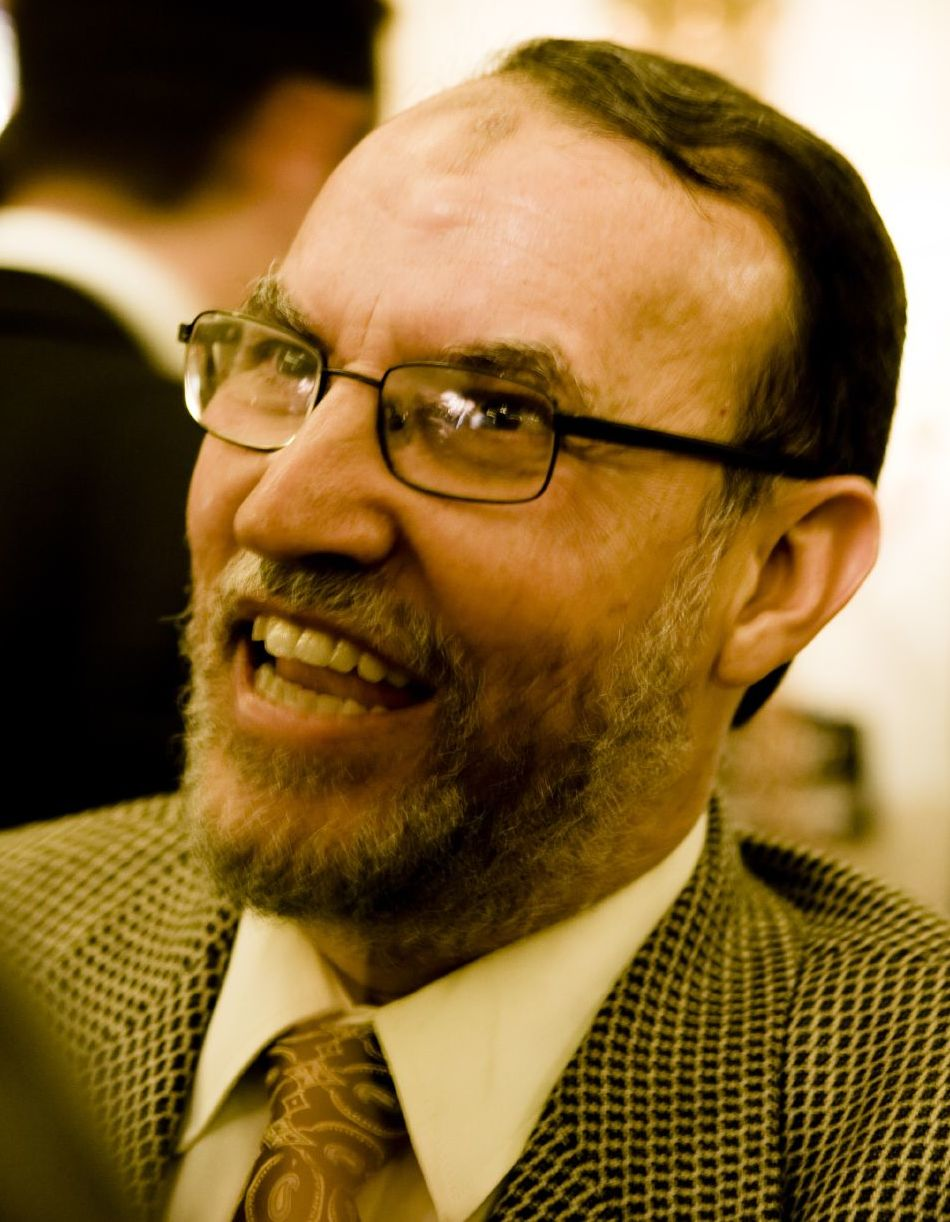
- Essam el-Erian in 2007

Vice Chairman of the Freedom and Justice Party
- In office 30 April 2011 – 9 August 2014
- Chairman: Mohamed Morsi; Saad El-Katatni
- Preceded by: Office created
- Succeeded by: Party outlawed

Personal details
- Born: 28 April 1954 Nahya, Imbaba, Egypt
- Died: 13 August 2020 (aged 66) Scorpion Prison, Cairo Governorate, Egypt
- Cause of death: Heart attack
- Party: Freedom and Justice Party
- Education: Cairo University
- Profession: Physician

Essam al-Din Muhammad Hussein el-Erian (Arabic: عصام الدين محمد حسين العريان) (28 April 1954 – 13 August 2020) was an Egyptian physician and politician. He was the vice chairman of the Freedom And Justice Party. Formerly he was a member of the Guidance Bureau of the Muslim Brotherhood. He was elected as a parliament member in the 2011–12 Egyptian parliamentary election. After the 2013 Egyptian coup, prosecutors ordered his arrest on 10 July 2013. On 14 July 2013, Egypt's new prosecutor general Hisham Barakat ordered his assets to be frozen. el-Erian was arrested by the government on 30 October 2013. He was also the paternal cousin of Sami Amin Al-Arian.

== Early life and education ==
el-Erian was born on 28 April 1954. He graduated from the School of Medicine in the Cairo University with honors in 1977, and also received a Bachelor of Law from the same university. During his time at university, el-Erian was the secretary of the cultural committee of the federation of students of medicine at the College of Medicine at Qasr Aini in 1972, and then became the president of the general union for students of Egyptian universities. He earned a master's degree in Pathology in 1986 from Cairo University. He also earned a bachelor's in Islamic Studies and a bachelor's in History from al-Azhar University respectively in 1999 and 2000. el-Erian was enrolled for a medical doctorate at Cairo University and for a degree in common law at the same university, a program he did not complete due to his imprisonment.

He was elected as a member of the board of directors of the Egyptian Medical Syndicate in 1986, being the assistant of the general secretary of the Egyptian Medical Syndicate. el-Erian was also a founding member of the Egyptian Organization for Human Rights.

== Biography ==
el-Erian was a prominent student leader in the 1970s and coordinated with other students, including Abdel Moneim Aboul Fotouh and Ibrahim El Zafarany to facilitate the entry of many small Islamic organizations into the Muslim Brotherhood. For many years he was a member of the Muslim Brotherhood and served on its Guidance Bureau before being the vice chairman of the freedom and justice party founded by the Muslim Brotherhood.

In 2012 during an interview on Egypt's Dream TV, el-Erian called on former Egyptian Jews who had immigrated to Israel and their descendants to return to Egypt, and called for all Israeli Jews to return to their countries of origin, be it "Poland, Egypt, or anywhere", and also called for the return of Palestinian refugees. el-Erian stated that although his party was against Zionism, it was not against the Jews, stating that "they have a complicated history, but the Jewish motherland is not Israel". In response to el-Erian's comments, a lawsuit was filed on grounds that he was spreading false information potentially harmful to national security while in a position of responsibility, by inferring that Arab Jews are responsible for "occupying Palestine".

== Imprisonment and death ==
el-Erian was arrested in 1981, during the famous September arrests that specifically targeted members of Islamist groups in large numbers. He was then tried in a military court for the members of the Muslim Brotherhood. He was imprisoned from 1995 to 2000, for a span of five years. The last time that he has been arrested was before the Friday of anger on 28 January 2011 during the Egyptian revolution.

el-Erian died on 13 August 2020 from a heart attack in Scorpion Prison, which is part of the Tora Prison complex.
