= Muslim Brotherhood in post-Mubarak electoral politics of Egypt =

Following the 2011 Egyptian revolution, the Muslim Brotherhood in Egypt became one of the main forces contending for political power in Egypt against the Supreme Council of the Armed Forces (SCAF) and other established centers of the former Hosni Mubarak regime.

The parliamentary election in November 2011 to January 2012 resulted in dominant parliamentary representation for the Freedom and Justice Party and other Islamic parties. The Brotherhood's leader Mohamed Morsi won the presidential election that followed in June 2012. Morsi became the first democratically elected and first civilian President of Egypt.

The Supreme Council made a series of moves aimed at minimizing the Brotherhood's influence and depriving it of its newly acquired institutional power base. The post-Mubarak ruling establishment had the outcome of the parliamentary election nullified in the courts. At the outset of Morsi's presidency, numerous critical issues were unresolved, including the status of the disbanded parliament and the sweeping powers granted by the military council to itself. The Brotherhood was formulating its response and working on a strategy for protecting its electoral gains in a new situation, when one of their own holds the highest elected office. Having come to power as a revolutionary force, but being historically pragmatic and moderately conservative, they now had a stake also in protecting the constitutional and legal continuity of the state. The electoral success of the Muslim Brotherhood gave rise to misgivings among other leaders and factions of the Egyptian revolution, and also in the United States and elsewhere.

In June 2012 Parliament instituted the Constituent Assembly of Egypt, tasked to prepare a new constitution to be approved in a referendum. The constitution was supported by 63.8% of voters in the referendum, held in December of that year.

Egypt remained highly unstable. The second anniversary of the revolution (January/February 2013) brought renewed mass street demonstrations and violence, with a number of fatalities. The volatility contributed to the deepening of the country's economic crisis. The Muslim Brotherhood faced opposition from some of the secular activists who had helped defeat the Mubarak regime, as well as from the judiciary and the military. President Morsi declared a limited state of emergency, but Egypt was being increasingly overtaken by "chaos and lawlessness".

Renewed mass demonstrations took place on President Morsi's first anniversary in office (June 2013). The demonstrators demanded his resignation or removal. Morsi refused to step down, but his elected government was overthrown in a military coup led by the Minister of Defense General Abdul Fatah al-Sisi on 3 July 2013. After weeks of tense pro-Morsi sit-in demonstrations in Cairo, a state of emergency was declared and the new regime's security forces violently dispersed the protestors on 14 August.

== Muslim Brotherhood in Mubarak's Egypt ==
During the long-lasting presidency of Hosni Mubarak, the Muslim Brotherhood went through different stages of social and political development and activity, becoming a formal participant in the political process, being a banned and persecuted opposition group, or both. During the later period of Mubarak's rule, the movement had been persecuted in a number of ways and candidates for offices associated with the Brotherhood were subjected by the government and the National Democratic Party to electoral fraud, causing the Brotherhood to boycott, together with other opposition parties, the second round of the parliamentary election of 2010.

Under President Mubarak, the government waged decades of psychological warfare against the Brotherhood and presented the Islamists as a dire threat to the country, using them as a justification for its own heavy-handed one-party rule and frequently imprisoning the movement's members.

== Muslim Brotherhood in Egyptian revolution ==
Muslim Brotherhood members joined the protests and demonstrations beginning in late January 2011, but the organization initially kept a low profile and refrained from seeking a leadership role in the uprising. At the same time, being the largest and best organized opposition force, its participation and support were essential for an eventual success of the opposition movement. The opposition's initial demands were concerned mainly with the removal of President Mubarak and his regime, seen as a precondition for any meaningful reform. The Brotherhood gradually assumed a more assertive role, culminating with the statement issued by the leadership in early February 2011, which sought an overthrow of the regime and the formation of a national unity government. Mubarak relinquished power on 11 February 2011.

The Supreme Council of the Armed Forces (SCAF) assumed power and the generals quickly became preoccupied with ensuring their own continuing autonomy and influence. Judge Tarek El-Bishry was appointed to head a committee to prepare a transitional constitution. A referendum on constitutional amendments was held on 19 March and a constitutional declaration was announced on 30 March. Aspects of the referendum involving the rules regarding the creation of a new permanent constitution were overruled by the increasingly assertive military council. Mass demonstrations continued in Tahrir Square in Cairo, now demanding the full dismantling of the old regime, guarantees of fundamental rights and democratic infrastructure before elections and speedy trials for officials accused of killing demonstrators; demonstrations took place for example on 8 April and 8 July, and an Islamist demonstration was held on 29 July. The Brotherhood was outraged by proposals from liberal activists and the generals' interest in creating Egypt's new constitution by a nominated constituent assembly, ahead of general elections.

After the Brotherhood established the Freedom and Justice Party to represent its point of view and interests in the unfolding political process, its activists participated in the massive rally in Tahrir Square on 18 November 2011, directed against SCAF, in power and enjoying a degree of popular support since the overthrow of President Mubarak, and the government proposals for "supra-constitutional principles", rules designed to protect civil liberties, but also to strengthen the role of the military and give the Mubarak-era courts a veto power over parliamentary elections. The protesters demanded civilian rule. Sit-in participants were attacked by the security forces on 19 November. The Brotherhood, concentrating on the upcoming parliamentary elections and not wanting to risk their postponement or cancellation, refrained from participating in the Mohamed Mahmoud Street protests and the clashes that raged over the next five days and resulted in about 47 protesters killed. The violent events and other rallies against the military rule that followed forced the SCAF generals to issue on 22 November a timetable for relinquishing power, culminating with the installment of an elected president by the end of June 2012. Large-scale anti-SCAF demonstrations continued on 25 November, the "Friday of Martyrs". On the other hand, the Mohamed Mahmoud fighting contributed to the emerging rift between the Brotherhood, intent on joining the government through the electoral process, and other, more "revolutionary" forces.

The United States had been hostile to Islamist movements since long before the September 11 attacks, partially because of its support for secular Arab autocratic rulers who were regarded as friendly toward American interests. Some were worried about the reported terrorist links of Egyptian Islamists. According to Michele Dunne, an Egypt expert at the Atlantic Council, "the movement of Islamists into mainstream politics should reduce the terrorism threat", but "if Islamist groups like the Brotherhood lose faith in democracy, that's when there could be dire consequences". Critics in the U.S. and elsewhere became concerned that a possible Brotherhood-dominated rule may more completely impose the Islamic Sharia law (already recognized under Egypt's constitution) in government and public life, to the exclusion of individuals and groups deemed unsuitable on strict religious grounds. Some were anxious about the role and situation of women.^{[a]}^{[b]} The future adherence to the Egypt–Israel peace treaty and Egypt's relations with Israel in general were another source of concern.

At the time of President Morsi's ascendancy, the Brotherhood was seen as a diverse group, not a unified block. Some in the upper leadership, such as the multimillionaire Khairat El-Shater, preferred neoliberal economic policies, while many in the middle and lower strata of the organization would see it as a reformist or revolutionary force. The internal contradictions within the Brotherhood, as one commentator predicted, would put them into a lasting crisis.

== Parliamentary election, Islamist parties' gains, dissolution of parliament ==
The parliamentary election, in which the Muslim Brotherhood was represented by its Freedom and Justice Party, was held in several stages and lasted from November 2011 to January 2012. The final results were announced on 21 January and indicated an overwhelming voter support for the Islamist parties, of which the Freedom and Justice Party took 47.2% of the vote and the more radically conservative Al-Nour Party 24.3%. Other political formations, including some of the most actively involved in the street protest movement, fell far behind, with 7.6% for the New Wafd Party and 6.8% for the Egyptian Bloc. Saad El-Katatni of the FJP became the speaker of the new assembly. To assume the impartial office, he resigned form the Muslim Brotherhood. Parliament's opening session took place on 23 January.

Elected parliament attempted to take control over the military-appointed interim government led by Prime Minister Kamal Ganzouri. According to a March statement by Speaker Saad El-Katatni, Ganzouri made a threat of judicial dissolution of the assembly if the parliamentarians persist and parliament backed down.

On 14 June, two days before the second and final round of the presidential election, the Supreme Constitutional Court of Egypt, quoting procedural inadequacies, declared the parliamentary vote unconstitutional, which amounted to an invalidation of its results in respect to the parliament's lower house. The court ruling caused public displays of anger and was interpreted by many as an effective coup and an attempt by the ruling junta to avoid sharing power with the Islamist parties and the Muslim Brotherhood in particular. Speaker Saad El-Katatny of the People's Assembly (the disbanded lower house) declared his resolve and determination to have the elected parliament reinstated.

The region has a long history of secular elites clamping down on Islamists attempting to achieve political gains by winning elections, including the events that led to the Algerian Civil War two decades before. Even though commentators typically chose to stress the "Islamist" or "Islamist dominated" character of the new parliament and criticise its lack of effectiveness, the democratically elected assembly, given the impossible task of passing laws in a system controlled by the hostile establishment of power, was the greatest accomplishment of the Egyptian Revolution. Legal scholars disputed the validity of the court's action.

The SCAF military council promptly enforced the court's ruling by ordering both chambers of the parliament dissolved^{[c]} and claiming broad legislative powers for itself. The cancelled parliament was "assembled painstakingly over months of elections and hailed as a triumph of democracy by the international community". According to Gamal Eid, a human rights lawyer, in recent years the Constitutional Court, staffed by Mubarak-loyal judges, has been guided by political considerations.

As the decision was announced two days before the final round of the presidential election, fears were expressed that the ruling establishment was, anticipating Mohamed Morsi's win, aiming to deprive the future president of fundamental elements on which to base his power, leaving him without a parliament and a constitution. The first democratically elected element of Egypt's new governmental structures was being "invalidated" by the Mubarak's regime bureaucratic machine, a move that appeared certain to be fiercely contested.

The arbitrary powers (constitution forming, legislative, executive and other) exercised by the military council had not attracted legal scrutiny or caused the judiciary to issue rulings on their validity or constitutionality. The military coup had been in effect since 11 February 2011, when Mubarak was overthrown and replaced by his generals, but back then the exalted public barely noticed. The junta may have wanted to leave day-to-day governing, but only after their interests, privileges and ultimate control over Egypt's decision making were secured and protected, by legal, political and constitutional guarantees.

On 17 June 2012, Speaker Saad El-Katatny met with the military council to deliver a message of the parliament dissolution being unconstitutional. However, according to a Brotherhood political consultant, while parliament in principle could not be dissolved, practical compromises were possible, as it was "not a problem for the Brotherhood to participate in a new round of parliamentary elections".

Although the breakup between elected parliament and the ruling generals was prompted by political disagreements (beginning with parliament's unsuccessful attempt to remove the prime minister), the Brotherhood leaders acknowledged the validity of the Constitutional Court technical reasons for the annulment of election results: the parties' use of individual allotments to run party list candidates (one-third of the total). However, the Brotherhood felt that the proper way to continue with the democratic process would be to repeat elections for the seats in question, or at the most, select the lower chamber in its entirety again under accelerated schedule.

== Constitution drafting assembly ==
In post-Mubarak Egypt, ruled primarily by the SCAF military council, the government has operated under a provisional constitution, parts of which were approved in a 2011 referendum. Egypt's elected parliament, dominated by the Islamist parties, had been working on the 100-member Constituent Assembly of Egypt, to be empowered to draft a new permanent constitution. The parliament's early attempts to form the panel were vigorously opposed (and in April 2012 successfully challenged in court) by non-Islamist groups demanding more broad-based representation, to guarantee protection of diversity and minority rights, including for those of the more secular orientation, women and youth. To end the bickering, on 5 June the military council gave the politicians a 48-hour deadline to reach an agreement on the assembly; otherwise, the generals threatened, they would issue the rules for the representation themselves.

Under the new deal soon announced, 39 seats were reserved for members of parliament (People's Assembly), in proportion to the numerical strength of the parties represented, which would give the Freedom and Justice Party 16 seats. The remaining seats were assigned to other recognized societal interests, including Muslim and Christian religious, constitutional and other scholars, armed forces, police, judiciary, trade unions (13 seats) and others. The panel's decisions would be made by a 67-member majority, reduced to 57 in case of a deadlock. The SCAF chief, Marshal Mohamed Hussein Tantawi, asked the parliament to convene to select actual members of the body.

On 8 June, Speaker Saad El-Katatny asked the various institutions and interested parties to present their nominations for the constitutional assembly members, to allow both houses of the parliament to act on their requests during the special joint session on 12 June. However, members of the Free Egyptians Party and their liberal and leftists allies from the Egyptian Bloc had taken themselves out of the process on 11 June, complaining of the supposedly continuous over-representation of the Islamists and accusing the military council and the Brotherhood of corrupting the political process.

The constitutional panel was appointed by the lawmakers on 12 June and member names were released on the FJP web site. It was empowered to draft a constitution in six months, the proposed document to be then approved in a national referendum. The charter was expected to define fundamental issues, including the powers of the presidency, the parliament, and the extent to which Islamic law will be officially applied.

The reestablished Constituent Assembly was threatened with new legal action and the dissolution of the People's Assembly (the lower house), ordered by the court on 14 June, raised further doubts about the long-term viability of the constitution writing body, itself created by the parliament. The Constituent Assembly was restricted, but conditionally upheld by SCAF in its "Constitutional Declaration" of 17 June.

On 18 June the assembly elected Hussam El Ghuriany, head of Egypt's Supreme Judicial Council, to preside over the body. On 26 June, he threatened to resign because of disagreements over his leadership, but was kept by an almost unanimous confidence vote. It was decided that assembly members who resign could be replaced by alternate candidates upon approval by the assembly. Assembly members argued that the administrative court, scheduled to rule on the assembly's validity, lacked jurisdiction in their case.

On 26 June, the Supreme Administrative Court delayed its decision on the assembly's legal status until 4 September, possibly giving the body enough time to finish the constitution before the ruling. The assembly passed its by-laws, according to which four specialized permanent committees were established: of Basic Principles of the State, of Rights and Freedoms, of System of Government and of Oversight and Regulatory Bodies. A committee to receive suggestions and talk to various sectors of Egyptian society and a committee for drafting and language were also created. A website for suggestions by citizens was authorized.

== Presidential election, elimination of candidates, victory of Mohamed Morsi ==
The Muslim Brotherhood, successful in the parliamentary election, initially declared no intention of designating a candidate for the presidential contest scheduled for May 2012. But the organization eventually decided to participate. Khairat El-Shater, one of the group's leaders and its financial expert, a successful businessman and former Mubarak era political prisoner, was chosen on 31 March to run as a candidate of the Freedom and Justice Party.

On 14 April, Egypt's high election commission disqualified 10 of the 23 presidential candidates on various grounds, Khairat El-Shater among them. Omar Suleiman, Mubarak's former vice president and controversial intelligence chief and the Salafi Islamist Hazem Salah Abu Ismail were also barred from running. El-Shater's disqualification was based on the sentence and pardon he received in a politically motivated trial going back to Mubarak's presidency, during which he spent a total of 12 years in prison. The nominees were given 48 hours to appeal to the same body.

The commission's ruling raised doubts regarding the credibility and fairness of the election process, taking place during the volatile times of transition, with the military leadership controlling or attempting to control the events. While some believed the election commission's actions to be legally justified, others suspected politicized motives, such as a desire to counter the growing influence of the Islamist movements, or possibly to prevent the Muslim Brotherhood, already dominant in the parliament, from presenting a potentially successful presidential candidacy. The candidates removed represented opposing political forces (the race appeared dominated by the Islamists on one side and the more secular former officials of Mubarak's government, believed to be favored by the present military council, on the other) and the commission's decisions were ostensibly based on narrow technical reasons. The recently elected parliament forbade in the meantime a participation of former Mubarak's regime top officials as candidates for Egypt's presidency, but the practical impact and validity of the legislation were at best in doubt, because of the assembly's tug of war with the military and constitutional uncertainties.

The FJP was able to enter its back-up candidate, the party's chairman Mohamed Morsi, an engineering professor with a PhD from the University of Southern California and the former leader of the small group of Brotherhood deputies (2000–2005) allowed in Mubarak's parliament. Morsi, generally not a well-known figure, had later spent some time in Mubarak's jails.

The Egyptian cleric Safwat Higazi spoke at the announcement rally for the Muslim Brotherhood's candidate Morsi and expressed his hope and belief that Morsi would liberate Gaza, restore the Caliphate of the "United States of the Arabs" with Jerusalem as its capital, and that "our cry shall be: 'Millions of martyrs march towards Jerusalem.'" Morsi himself did not echo these statements, and later promised to stand for peaceful relations with Israel.

The election commission decisions, upheld in their entirety after the appeals, appeared to have made the election less polarized and possibly to have improved the prospects of the candidates considered outside the two main currents, such as Abdel Moneim Aboul Fotouh, a liberal reformer, formerly of the Muslim Brotherhood, or Amr Moussa, the former Foreign Affairs Minister and Secretary General of the Arab League. Ahmed Shafik, the former Air Force commander and Prime Minister during the recent uprising, was expected to benefit from the disqualification of Omar Suleiman and get the vote of those supporting the establishment or dismayed by the deterioration of the economy and breakdown of security, blamed on the disorder caused by the revolution.

The voting took place on 23–24 May. The ruling Supreme Council of the Armed Forces (SCAF) had promised a fair election leading to return of civilian rule and the election process was being watched by its leader, Field Marshal Mohamed Hussein Tantawi. However, the content of the future constitution not being known, it was unclear what powers the future president would have, or to what degree the military would give up political power.

The results were a bitter disappointment to those in Egypt and abroad, who hoped that the election commission intervention would change the expected outcome. Mohamed Morsi placed first with 25% of the vote, followed by Ahmed Shafik (24%), Hamdeen Sabahi of the leftist Nasserist Dignity Party (21%), Abdel Moneim Aboul Fotouh (17%) and Amr Moussa (11%).

Ahead of the run-off election there were calls, in the parliament and elsewhere, for the Muslim Brotherhood to increase its inclusiveness, for the biggest presidential vote getters, other than Mubarak's last prime minister, to form a unified front, and for the revolutionary forces, many of whose activists were not happy with the choice available, to mobilize, elect the president and help him to put pressure on the SCAF. Morsi's first round victory would have been numerically more convincing had the Islamist vote not been split between him and other candidates. Among the reformist factions reluctantly endorsing Mohamed Morsi was the April 6 Youth Movement.

At the time of the final round of the presidential election, the SCAF military council openly declared granting the legislative and constitution writing powers to themselves, and its intention to keep them even after a new president is elected. Egyptian voters were faced with a distinct and uneasy choice: the prospect of a prolonged power struggle, if Mohamed Morsi is elected, or a likely more smooth continuation of the old regime (a return to "stability", sought by many negatively affected by the revolution), if Ahmed Shafik wins. During the final days of the campaign, each candidate was well-supported organizationally, by the Brotherhood local networks, or by the apparatus of the former Mubarak's party, backed by the ruling military. The Brotherhood issued a statement to mobilize its followers and others, demanding a national referendum on the status of the disbanded parliament, accusing the ruling junta of preempting the promised civilian government with autocratic measures and perpetrating "a coup against the entire democratic march".

Early on 18 June, the Brotherhood projected Mohamed Morsi the winner. Morsi in his remarks obliged himself to represent all Egyptians, regardless of who they voted for, and especially declared his support for the rights of the Coptic Church members, the largest Christian minority in Egypt. Mr. Shafik's spokesman also predicted his candidate' victory.

The election commission announced a delay of its proclamation of the election winner on 20 June, the day before their expected ruling. The officials said they needed more time to investigate reports of voting abuse and "view the candidates' appeals". The voting count had been public and Morsi's victory confirmed by the official media, but Ahmed Shafik added to the instability by declaring himself a winner. The commission's delay was seen as the continuation of crisis politics and power struggle and expression of pressure being applied by the regime on the Brotherhood, which engaged in renewed street demonstrations.

Shafik, the military and the judiciary were seen by the Brotherhood as elements of the alliance protecting the old order and trying to prevent electoral change, but blocking Morsi's win would require "aggressive and massive changes of the final results". Brotherhood top leaders, including Khairat El-Shater, declared the undoing of the court ruling on elected parliament and of the military's new constitutional declaration (17 June) as non-negotiable, while some of the younger cadres of the organization appeared eager to take on the military. Behind the scenes, however, the Brotherhood leaders were reported to be engaged in continuous negotiations with the ruling junta. Both sides were aware of the enormous human and economic cost of a renewed full-scale confrontation. The interior ministry, top judiciary, military leaders and others may have been bargaining with the Brothers on the various assurances for their institutions and themselves that they had demanded.

Tens of thousands, including the Brotherhood and the 6 April Movement activists, protested in Cairo's Tahrir Square on 19–22 June. Wael Ghonim, a key leader of the revolution, was among the public figures who declared their support for Mohamed Morsi, who held a news conference. An anti-Brotherhood media campaign of defamation, a traditional tool of state media, was underway and now joined also by many in private media. Counter-demonstrations were being waged by supporters of the candidacy of Ahmed Shafik, who presented himself as ready to accept his "victory". Shafik's presidency was seen as lesser evil by some other activists from the liberal and secular circles of the uprising. A "national front" was being organized by the Brotherhood with liberals willing to participate. The election commission announced its intention to declare the winner on Sunday, 24 June.

Morsi's victory was indeed announced with 51.73% of the vote (over 13 million votes). Although the margin was relatively small, it followed the previous plurality victories of the Brotherhood party in both houses of parliament. The possibility of such electoral sweep had led to accusations of the Islamists', dominant also in the constitutional assembly, desire to monopolize Egypt's politics. Crowds of jubilant supporters filled Cairo streets following the official proclamation. After the victory, to represent all Egyptians, Morsi resigned his membership in the Brotherhood and in FJP. The new president promised to honor Egypt's international agreements and protect the rights of women, children and the Christian minority. At the moment, however, the presidency appeared to be only a figurehead position, because of the recent pronouncements of the ruling military chiefs.

As Mohamed Morsi was being elevated to the presidency, Egyptian society was fiercely polarized. The over 48% who voted for Ahmed Shafik represented an emerging coalition of the old guard from the authoritarian regime and the "secular liberals", many of whom during the past months had struggled to overthrow that same regime. They now saw the Brotherhood as a threat to the civil state, an organization plotting to impose religious rule and "accused" the Brotherhood of "hijacking" the revolution.

== Military council's assumption of extensive powers ==
On 13 June, a military decree empowered soldiers to arrest civilians, to be tried in military courts, until the new constitution is approved.

As the presidential voting was coming to an end and Egyptians were awaiting its official results, the Supreme Council of the Armed Forces issued on 17 June a constitutional declaration, in which it arbitrarily granted itself extended powers, including legislative, constitution drafting, and other supervisory and veto authority after the new president assumes his office. SCAF had previously promised a full transfer to civilian rule after the election process is completed (30 June was the date given).

In introducing the changes the military council may have been motivated by a desire to prevent the newly elected president from automatically becoming the head of SCAF according to an existing statute. This role had been fulfilled by President Mubarak before his departure.

The decree, which included eight amendments to the earlier (March 2011) declaration, granted the military a complete autonomy and exempted it from civilian oversight, or from being commanded by the new president. The command of the military forces was assumed by the head of SCAF, Field Marshal Mohamed Hussein Tantawi (Minister of Defense since 1991). The ruling military council would choose its own leaders.

The Constituent Assembly, working on the new constitution amid uncertainties regarding its status, was conditionally upheld, its work being subjected to objections from several possible sources and binding judgement from the Supreme Constitutional Court, the court that declared the parliamentary election invalid. If the assembly encountered an "obstacle" that prevented it from continuing, SCAF would choose a new constituent assembly by itself.

SCAF declared a new parliamentary election taking place one month after the new constitution is approved in a referendum, thus attempting to terminate the issue of the currently elected parliament. Until the election, SCAF would assume legislative responsibilities itself.

The new president, acting under the military decree, would name vice presidents and cabinet, propose budget and laws, and issue pardons. He would head, the apparently advisory, National Security Council.

The military declaration, seen as a "power grab", was immediately rejected by the Muslim Brotherhood and alarmed human rights activists and other observers of Egyptian developments. On 19 June the Brotherhood called for mass protests across Egypt.

Two members of SCAF held the military's first news conference just before the presidential vote. The generals claimed having regretted dissolving the parliament, but being forced to do so by the court's ruling, and not wanting to hold onto power any longer than necessary. But the military council made further moves to consolidate its power, including the announcement of its choosing and naming of the new president's chief of staff.

The United States Government, which has strong strategic ties and provides major financial support to Egypt's military, while being wary of Islamist power, had nevertheless repeatedly urged SCAF and other Egyptian authorities to fully transfer political power to a civilian government, in accordance with the results of the current democratic processes.

On 26 June, the administrative court in Cairo suspended the decree allowing the military to arrest civilians. The overruled decision was described by rights groups as "a blatant circumvention of the official end of the state of emergency".

== Struggle for power following presidential election ==
Mohamed Morsi, the candidate backed by the Muslim Brotherhood, won Egypt's presidential election, according to the results announced on 24 June 2012, by the election commission. Morsi was thought to represent the older and more conservative wing of the Brotherhood and was suspected by opponents of wanting to impose fundamentalist theocracy. He himself had denied any such intentions and vowed to represent equally all Egyptians. He declared his support for the Egypt–Israel peace treaty and other international obligations.

The President-elect was congratulated by Marshal Mohamed Hussein Tantawi, head of the SCAF council, but without a permanent constitution and a sitting parliament, and with the openly declared supervision by the military, it was unclear how much real power he would have.

On 24 June, Morsi gave his first public speech. He asserted that "the revolution will continue until all its objectives are achieved" and expressed his appreciation for both the armed forces and the judges. The judiciary must "truly and genuinely work separately from the executive and legislative powers". He referred to Egyptians as Muslims and Christians and reaffirmed his dedication to the promotion of freedoms, human rights and the rights of women and children.

Among President Morsi's other "immense challenges" were Egypt's political division into nearly two halves, legacy of corruption, poverty, unemployment and the worsening since the revolution economic situation and stability. While the security situation had deteriorated with increased violent crime, Morsi would have to deal with the security apparatus that had specialized for decades in suppressing the Muslim Brotherhood. He would have to match his pragmatic desire to have good working relations with the US and Israel with a regional need (and a long-standing Brotherhood policy) to create a more balanced relationship with Iran, against which the Western powers had adopted a hostile stance.

With parliament dissolved, the military council scheduled Morsi to be sworn as president before the Supreme Constitutional Court on 30 June. While anti-SCAF street protests continued, it was announced that the council's head, Marshal Hussein Tantawi, would remain the minister of defense under the new president.

The day before the swearing-in Morsi spoke to a crowd of supporters at Tahrir Square in Cairo, took a symbolic oath before them and declared the Egyptian people, not the establishment, to be his source of legitimacy. Morsi, however, deferred to the political reality of the moment and agreed to be sworn in before the Supreme Court, rather than before a reinstated parliament, as the Brotherhood had demanded.

At the time of Morsi's inauguration, the regime of former president Mubarak was still largely intact and seen as likely not willing to fully cooperate with the new president. The looming imminent confrontation was over the installment of elected parliament's dismissed lower chamber, already promised by Morsi. However, the SCAF council insisted that power was being turned over to the elected president and civilian authority, as they had promised.

The first Islamist elected to lead an Arab state, in his remarks made before the official audience after the swearing-in President Morsi never mentioned Islamic law. He commended Field Marshal Tantawi for his role in the transition, but said that the army will go back to their role of protecting the boundaries and security of the country. But SCAF's previously declared executive and legislative authority had been kept intact, until the new constitution and parliament are in place. The generals were reported wanting to make sure that Egypt is turning into a civil, rather than religious state, not "monopolized by any group or direction".

On 1 July, Morsi ordered the formation of a committee to discuss the status of detainees. The President was reported to be actively searching for ways of restoring the lower house of parliament and obtaining a release of non-criminal political detainees.

The President issued a decree on 5 July, calling for an establishment of a commission charged with investigating the past (until the end of June) killings of unarmed and peaceful uprising participants by the government's security services. Some of the interior ministry officers were already acquitted in a controversial court decision in June, when Hosni Mubarak and Habib el-Adly were sentenced to life in prison. Addressing the general impunity of the army and police appeared to challenge the ruling military's authority.

On 8 July, President Morsi issued a presidential decree reinstating the dissolved People's Assembly. Two days later the decree was rejected by the Supreme Constitutional Court, the same court that previously (on 14 June) invalidated the lower chamber's election.

The new president's order was an open challenge to Egypt's top authorities, military and judicial, both holdovers from the long period of Mubarak's rule. Since the dictator's removal, they had colluded in order to prevent Islamist election victories or full implementation of election results. The dissolution of parliament appeared to please many secularists, liberals and Egyptian Christians who had been alarmed by the Brotherhood's victory. Morsi did not directly challenge the 14 June court decision, only cancelled SCAF's executive order to dissolve the parliament's lower chamber that followed as an implementation of the court's ruling.

After the presidential order for parliament to reconvene, the SCAF military council, apparently not warned in advance, held an emergency session. Morsi also decreed a new parliamentary election within 60 days of the adoption of the new constitution, a compromise move meant to shorten the term of the often-criticized parliament and acknowledge the court's demand for a newly elected body. At the time of the decree the work on the constitution was still in its early stages. The Supreme Constitutional Court's emergency session was called for 9 July to review the legality of the President's move.

The court indeed reaffirmed its previous ruling as "final and binding". SCAF defended its June edict as a necessary action on behalf of the court ruling. It expected "all state institutions" to respect all its "constitutional declarations". Numerous cases were also filed against Morsi in the administrative court expected to overrule the presidential decree.

Behind all the legal arguments advanced by both sides commentators saw a "raw contest for supremacy", a "duel between the Brotherhood and the military", a "fight between the nation's oldest and most influential Islamist organization and appointees of the ousted president, Hosni Mubarak", and a fundamental conflict between "elected and unelected parts of the state". It was understood by some that President Morsi could not succeed without parliament. On Monday 9 July, the riot police and guards surrounding the parliamentary building started allowing lawmakers inside. The Brotherhood called for a "million-man" protest on Tuesday, while Speaker Saad El-Katatni announced a public assembly of the parliamentarians on that day.

== SCAF leaders forced to retire ==
On 12 August 2012, in a highly unexpected development, President Morsi forced into retirement senior SCAF generals, led by Mohamed Hussein Tantawi and Sami Hafez Anan, who had been ruling the country since the deposition of President Mubarak. Morsi also invalidated a "constitutional declaration" previously imposed by the military council to expand the military leaders' own powers and reduce those of the presidency and to claim legislative and other authority. Morsi afterwards functioned in his presidential capacities, while the issues of the new constitution and parliament were being contested. In November 2012, Morsi was credited for arranging a truce in the escalating Palestinian armed conflict between Gaza's Hamas governing faction and Israel.

== President Morsi's temporary assumption of full constitutional power and push for new constitution ==
On 23 October 2012, the Administrative Court referred the case of the Constituent Assembly to the Supreme Constitutional Court, further delaying and putting in doubt the resolution of the Assembly's controversy. The Constituent Assembly was plagued by continuous disagreements and protest-resignations of many of its non-Islamist members.

Threatened with a gridlock caused by the possible Mubarak-era's judiciary invalidation of the Constituent Assembly, President Morsi issued on 22 November 2012, his second major constitutional declaration. The President assumed sweeping additional powers that he deemed necessary for the completion of the democratization process, granting the Constituent Assembly an additional two months to finish their work on the new constitution and protecting the body from any judicial interference. A new prosecutor general was appointed and lawsuits filed against the President's previous decisions were annulled. Morsi's rulings were declared final until approval of the constitution and election of a new People's Assembly. The presidential decree galvanized the already ongoing street demonstrations, organized by opponents who saw the President's declaration as a "power grab", and made further confrontations between the Muslim Brotherhood and their former reluctant allies in the uprising all but certain. Given the genuine national division over the constitution and more generally over a possible Islamist rule (nearly half of the presidential poll electorate voted for Ahmed Shafik, a politician connected to the old regime), the judicial establishment and their new secular allies, coming typically from the more affluent strata of Egypt's society, constituted for the Islamists a formidable opposition front.

The Constituent Assembly, reduced by the withdrawal of its non-Islamist members, hurriedly completed the constitution proposal and on 29 November 2012, submitted it to President Morsi for approval and for the scheduling of national referendum vote on the document. On 1 December, the President announced 15 December to be the date of the referendum and hundreds of thousands marched in Cairo in support of his moves. In the following days, mass protests and violent clashes between Morsi's supporters and opponents, who did not want the constitution vote to take place, resulted in a number of fatalities. Many in Egyptian media waged partisan, anti-Brotherhood and anti-Morsi campaigns. Brotherhood offices were burned at a number of locations. On 8 December, the President voided his constitutional declaration but not the referendum on the constitution.

== Constitutional referendum ==
The referendum on the new constitution began on 15 December, and was scheduled to last into the following week, presumably because of the shortage of judges willing to participate in supervising the election process. The main opposition leaders opted for advocating a "no" vote rather than calling for a boycott of the referendum.

The official results, announced on 25 December, gave the constitution the support of 63.8% of the total votes cast (32.9% turnout). Critiques said that the constitution did not mention social justice and the tax system was still unfair. It would not solve the social and economic problems of the people that caused the revolution. The passage of the charter appeared to have paved the way for a parliamentary election, announced to begin in April 2013, but the process soon became bogged down in court challenges.

== Crisis on revolution's second anniversary ==
About the time of the second anniversary of the events that sparked the 2011 Egyptian revolution, a new series of violent demonstrations, fueled also by an extreme court ruling, caused further instability. Abdul Fatah al-Sisi, the chief of the Armed Forces, warned of the risk of collapse of the state.

== Morsi deposed in a military coup ==
Renewed mass demonstrations took place on President Morsi's first anniversary in office. The demonstrators demanded his resignation or removal. Morsi refused to step down, but his elected government was overthrown in a coup led by General Al-Sisi on 3 July 2013. The new authorities proceeded with arrests of government officials and Muslim Brotherhood top leaders. Many are expected to be accused in politicized trials of "insulting the judiciary", inciting to violence and similar charges. Those who were still able to speak expressed unwillingness to cooperate with the "usurper" regime.

The forcible removal from the government, by minority elites and mobs, of the Muslim Brotherhood politicians, who with other Islamists won three successive national elections (parliamentary, presidential and constitution referendum), was seen as a certain cause of radicalization of the Islamist movements in Egypt and elsewhere. Legitimate elections in Egypt were not possible after the coup, even if someone made an attempt in that direction. Such a move was improbable though, given that "Egypt's military, judiciary, media and civil society leadership have repeatedly blocked Morsi's attempts to re-elect a lower house of Parliament or invitations for dialogue to resolve a yearlong political impasse". The Islamists had tried democratic participation but had been betrayed by the "democratic" reformers, and, as some commentators warned, many would now conclude that "the only way to create an Islamist state is through armed struggle". "Moderating Islamist ideology" may no longer be an option.

Egypt's Arab Spring revolutionaries went a full circle. From overthrowing the authoritarian regime, through combining with its preserved establishment in trying to prevent elections, or prevent the implementation of the (unpalatable to the reformers and establishment) election results. This had been done with varying degrees of success, but the long "court ordered" repeat election of the lower house of parliament had never been allowed to take place. Then the revolutionary "rebels" completed their conversion and through sustained and tenacious action facilitated the return of the authoritarian regime, which in due course would perform sham elections with controlled and guaranteed outcome. The post-Mubarak electoral politics of Egypt was over.

The confrontation of the Brotherhood protesters with the security forces left over fifty dead on 8 July. The new authorities announced a tentative schedule for new elections, a move rejected as illegitimate by the Brotherhood leadership. An arrest warrant was issued for Mohammed Badie, the Brotherhood's Supreme Guide.

The position of the Muslim Brotherhood and President Morsi's supporters being that he must be reinstated, more street demonstrations and violence took place by mid-July. The new regime claimed having offered the Brotherhood positions in the government, while it acted with criminal prosecutions against the organization's leaders and its property. The United States and many other governments, eager for a stabilization in Egypt, refused to acknowledge that a military coup had taken place or that an elected Egyptian government was overthrown. Many in the Western media expressed ambivalence about or support for the coup, some called it "democratic". The Christian Science Monitor's editorial board called Egypt a "young democracy" and a "new democracy" on 16 July 2013. President Morsi's family said he was abducted by the army, held incommunicado for weeks and they were taking local and international legal measures aimed at obtaining his release. According to the comments made by the U.S. Secretary of State John Kerry on 1 August, the Egyptian military command was "restoring democracy" when they deposed the country's first freely elected president.

== Action against pro-Morsi protesters: declaration of state of emergency ==
After weeks of tense pro-Morsi sit-in demonstrations in Cairo, the new regime's security forces moved in to disperse the large encampments on 14 August. The August 2013 Egyptian raids by the Egyptian military, under commands from El-Sisi, attempted to remove camps of Muslim Brotherhood supporters from sit-ins being held throughout the country. This resulted in rapidly escalating violence that eventually led to the deaths of 638 people, of whom 595 were civilians and 43 police officers, with at least 3,994 injured. With new fighting reported throughout the country, a month-long nationwide state of emergency was declared. The regime took control of most media outlets and in its propaganda broadcasts consistently referred to President Morsi's supporters as "terrorists". The arrest of Mohammed Badie, the Brotherhood's Supreme Guide, was reported on 19 August.

== Notes ==
a. Dalia Ziada, an Egyptian liberal human rights activist and women's rights advocate, expressed skepticism about the Muslim Brotherhood's sincerity about empowering women. According to her, the Brotherhood leaders, who often declare support for women's rights for political expediency, "cannot see a woman outside the biological stereotypes as a mother, child-bearer, and housewife", while the activists think in terms of Western values and seek "gender equality in social, political, and civic spheres". The Brotherhood's record is that of marginalizing women in their group (the Muslim Sisters and the more recent efforts by the Freedom and Justice Party are mentioned), but Ziada sees a more fundamental problem in the general patriarchal mind-set that stigmatizes the more independent women and in the rise of political Islamists, who (wrongly) use religion to marginalize women socially and politically.

One month after the revolution, Ziada and her colleagues ran a survey, asking 1453 people, including 634 women, whether it would be good for Egypt to have a woman president. The answer was negative in 100% of cases, typically accompanied by abusive comments. Ziada prays "that Morsi will prove her wrong" and help "to empower Egypt through empowering its women in their non-biological roles".

b. Naglaa Ali Mahmoud is President Morsi's wife. Her appearance and attitudes are indicative of the divisions between Egypt's westernized elite that has dominated the country in the past decades and the newly ascendant Islamists. She dresses in plain covering clothes characteristic of pious Muslim women. Under Hosni Mubarak, the commonly worn Islamic headscarfs were banned from official view, for example they could not be used by female television presenters. The wives of Egypt's previous two presidents, Jehan Sadat and Suzanne Mubarak, were highly visible and considered influential. Mrs. Morsi, in contrast, keeps a low profile, does not wish to be referred to as the "first lady" and see herself as just the wife of Egypt's first servant. She supported her husband during the presidential campaign without trying to attract attention to herself. Naglaa Mahmoud, a mother of five and a Brotherhood counselor, had been a subject of snide remarks and crude attacks on popular internet sites.

c. According to the cited Financial Times article. Parliament's upper chamber, the [[[Shura Council (Egypt)|Shura Council]], was actually preserved until the 2013 coup d'état.
