= Ali Abdel Aal =

Egyptian law professor and politician (born 1948)

- علي عبد العال
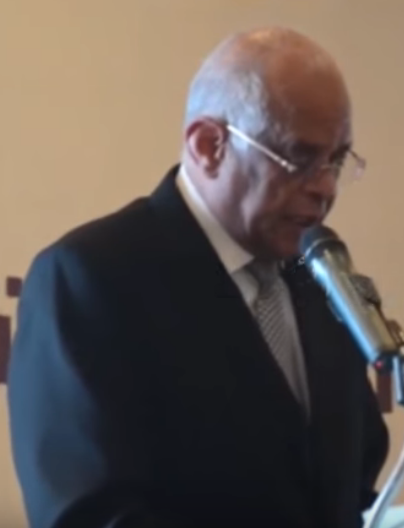
- Abdel Aal in 2016

11th Speaker of the House of Representatives of Egypt
- In office 10 January 2016 – 12 January 2021
- Deputy: Mahmoud El Sherif; Suleiman Wahdan
- Preceded by: Saad El-Katatni (2012)
- Succeeded by: Hanafi Ali Gibali

Personal details
- Born: 29 November 1948 (age 77) Nagaa El-Shaikh Ibrahim, Aswan, Egypt
- Party: For the Love of Egypt

Ali Abdel Aal Sayyed Ahmed (Arabic: علي عبد العال; born 29 November 1948) is an Egyptian law professor and politician. He served as the 11th speaker of the House of Representatives of Egypt from 2016 to 2021. As law professor he worked at Ain Shams University and specialized in constitutional law.

== Career ==
Abdel Aal was born on 29 November 1948, in Nagaa El-Shaikh Ibrahim, Daraw, Aswan Governorate.

He studied law and obtained a degree from Ain Shams University in 1972. The next year he started working as a deputy to a prosecutor. In 1974 he became a university lecturer. Ten years later he obtained his PhD in State at the University of Paris.

Abdel Aal was cultural attaché in the city of his alma mater from 1987 to 1991. The next year he served as constitutional advisor to the Parliament of Egypt. In 1993 he helped with the drafting of the Constitution of Ethiopia. As a constitutional advisor he was employed by the Royal Court of Kuwait between 1993 and 2011. Abdel Aal worked as constitutional law professor at Ain Shams University.

Abdel Aal was one of the constitutional experts who worked on the Egyptian Constitution of 2014. In 2015 he was the head of a committee which drafted three new electoral laws.

In the 2015 parliamentary elections Abdel Aal was elected on the For the Love of Egypt list for the Aswan Constituency. He was elected Speaker of the House of Representatives on 10 January 2016. He obtained 401 of 585 votes.

In 2019, Abdel Aal defended President Sisi in fall 2019, but via a favorable comparison to Adolf Hitler. “Hitler has his mistakes," he reportedly commented. "But what enabled him to expand east and west was the country's infrastructure he built. Even now that is the engine that drove Germany to become a top-tier country." He said "harsh measures" are required when "institutions are built and infrastructure is laid down". He later said his words had been taken "out of context"; pro-government sources reported his comments.

After the 2020 Egyptian parliamentary election Abdel Aal obtained a seat in parliament, but did not run for re-election as Speaker and was succeeded by Hanafi Ali Gibali on 12 January 2021. In February 2021 several MP's called upon Abdel Aal to attend parliament or resign as MP.

Political offices
Vacant Title last held by Saad El-Katatni as Speaker of the People's Assembly	Speaker of the House of Representatives; 2016–2021	Succeeded by Hanafi Ali Gibali
