= Hanafy El Gebaly =

Egyptian judge and politician

- حنفي جبالي
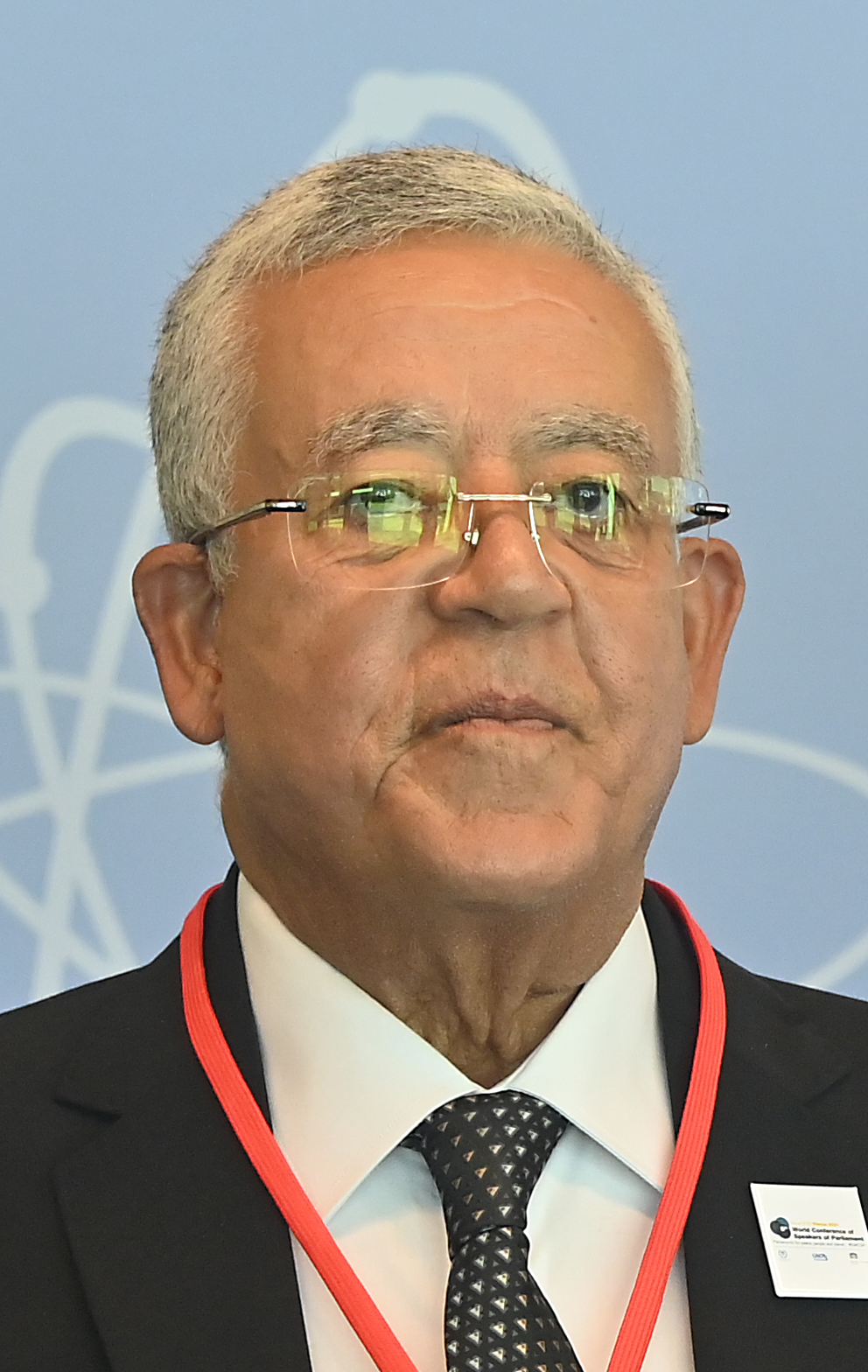
- El Gebaly in 2021

12th Speaker of the House of Representatives of Egypt
- In office 12 January 2021 – 12 January 2026
- Deputy: Mohamed M. Abou El Enein, Ahmed Saad Eddine
- Preceded by: Ali Abdel Aal
- Succeeded by: Hisham Badawy

Chief Justice of the Supreme Constitutional Court
- Chancellor
- In office March 2018 – June 2019
- Preceded by: Abdel-Wahab Abdel-Razeq
- Succeeded by: Saeed Marie

Personal details
- Born: 14 July 1949 (age 77) Cairo, Egypt
- Party: Independent politician
- Education: Cairo University

Hanafy Ali El Gebaly (born 1949) is an Egyptian politician. He is the president of the Egyptian parliament of the House of Representatives since October 2020. He served as the 12th speaker of the House of Representatives of Egypt from 2021 to 2026.

El-Gebali previously served as chief justice of the Supreme Constitutional Court.

== Early life ==
He was born 14 July 1949 in Cairo, Egypt,

He graduated from Cairo University in 1975 and got a post diploma from Ain Shams University in 1977 in criminal law. He earned a PhD in Constitutional law.

== Career ==
He started working in the judicial department and rose to become deputy Attorney General in 1978. He was moved down to Constitutional Court at State Council in 2001 as member and became deputy judge in 2005. He served as a secretary-general of the Union of Arab Constitutional Courts from 2011– 2018. He retired from the judicial board in 2019 and joined the Parliament after serving as the chief of Supreme Constitutional Court in 2019.

When serving as the head of SCC, he issued many rulings in cases up to 227.

He published books that have been translated into different languages.

== Votes ==
He polled 508 votes out of 576 votes of the parliament and the majority of the votes came from the National List for Egypt party. He has been elected into parliament since 2019.

== Tiran and Sanafir island controversy ==
As a judge he approved the maritime border agreement between Egypt and Saudi Arabia. Cairo had agreed to cede the island of Tiran and Sanafir to Saudi Arabia in 2016. Later President Sisi signed the agreement. This caused great irritation to many opposition politicians. When Tiran and Sanafir were transferred, many citizens protested and objections were made against the decision. Gebali claimed that it was the government's decision.

Legal offices
Preceded by Abdel-Wahab Abdel-Razeq	Chief Justice of the Supreme Constitutional Court; 2018–2019	Succeeded by Saeed Marie
Political offices
Preceded by Ali Abdel Aal	Speaker of the House of Representatives; 2021–2026	Succeeded by Hisham Badawy
