= Saeed Marie =

Egyptian judge (1954–2022)

- سعيد مرعي
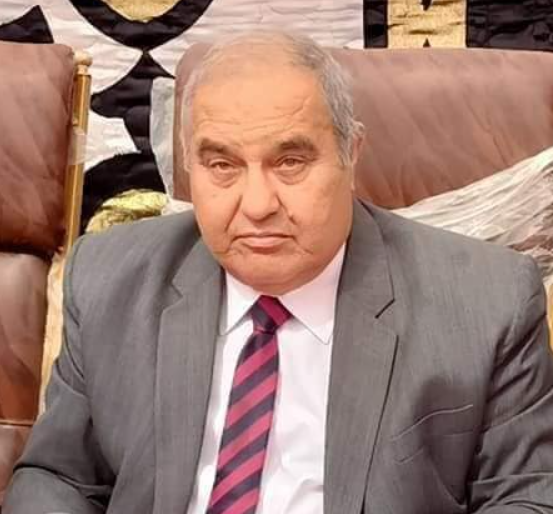

Chief Justice of the Supreme Constitutional Court
- In office 14 July 2019 – 9 February 2022
- Preceded by: Hanafy El Gebaly
- Succeeded by: Boulos Fahmy

Personal details
- Born: 30 August 1954 Giza, Egypt
- Died: 16 February 2022 (aged 67)
- Education: Cairo University (LLB)

Saeed Marie (30 August 1954 – 16 February 2022) was an Egyptian jurist who served as Chief Justice of the Supreme Constitutional Court from 2019 to 2022. His legal career started in the 1970s and he rose to be appointed as one of the ten vice president to the Supreme Constitutional Court in 2002. President Abdel Fattah el-Sisi appointed him as chief justice and Marie served until retiring due to poor health in 2022.

== Early life and education ==
Saeed Marie was born in Giza, Egypt, on 30 August 1954. He graduated with a Bachelor of Laws degree from Cairo University in 1976. He received a diploma in public law in 1978, and a diploma in administrative sciences in 1979. He was a Muslim.

== Career ==
Marie was appointed to the State Council in 1977, and rose to become judge assistant in the council. In 1990, Marie became a judge in the Authority of Commissioners of the Supreme Constitutional Court in 1990, and appointed as one of the ten vice presidents of the Supreme Constitutional Court in 2002.

President Abdel Fattah el-Sisi appointed Marie to replace Hanafy El Gebaly as Chief Justice of the Supreme Constitutional Court on 14 July 2019. Marie was the second oldest judge on the court at the time of his appointment. Sisi gave himself the right to appoint the head of Supreme Constitutional Court in 2017.

== Death ==
Marie underwent kidney transplantation in 2019, and suffered from declining health until his death on 16 February 2022. Before his death Marie retired from the Supreme Constitutional Court due to his poor health and was replaced as chief justice by Boulos Fahmy on 9 February.

== Works cited ==
- "Egyptian Constitutional Court's ex-chief passes away after long struggle with illness". Egypt Today. 16 February 2022. Archived from the original on 23 June 2025.
- "President Sisi appoints new head of Egyptian Constitutional Court". International Institute for Democracy and Electoral Assistance. 12 July 2019. Archived from the original on 23 June 2025.
- "Sisi appoints Saeed Marie as head of Constitutional Court". Egypt Today. 11 July 2019. Archived from the original on 23 June 2025.
- Magdy, Samy (9 February 2022). "Egypt names first-ever Christian head of country's top court". Associated Press. Archived from the original on 23 June 2025.

Political offices
Preceded by Hanafy El Gebaly	President of the Supreme Constitutional Court; 11 July 2019	Incumbent
