= Maher El-Beheiry =

Egyptian politician

President of the Supreme Constitutional Court of Egypt
- In office 1 July 2012 – 1 July 2013
- Appointed by: Mohamed Morsi
- Preceded by: Farouk Sultan
- Succeeded by: Adly Mansour

Personal details
- Born: 17 March 1943 (age 83)

Maher El-Beheiry (Arabic: ماهر البحيري; born 17 March 1943) was President of the Supreme Constitutional Court of Egypt. He succeeded Farouk Sultan as president of the court on 1 July 2012. He served for a year, until 1 July 2013, when he was succeeded by Adly Mansour. For a time during the 2013 Egyptian coup d'état, some organizations reported El-Beheiry as having been selected for the position of acting President of Egypt. However, these reports were incorrect: Mansour, the current court president, was selected as acting president.
