= Sufi Abu Taleb =

Egyptian politician (1925–2008)

His Excellency Sufi Abu Taleb
- صوفي أبو طالب
- Taleb during his time as the speaker of the People's Assembly of Egypt

Acting President of Egypt
- In office 6 October 1981 – 14 October 1981
- Prime Minister: Hosni Mubarak
- Preceded by: Anwar Sadat
- Succeeded by: Hosni Mubarak

6th Speaker of the People's Assembly of Egypt
- In office 4 November 1978 – 4 November 1983
- Appointed by: People's Assembly
- President: Anwar Sadat; Himself (acting); Hosni Mubarak
- Prime Minister: Mustafa Khalil; Anwar Sadat; Hosni Mubarak; Ahmad Fuad Mohieddin
- Preceded by: Sayed Marei
- Succeeded by: Mohamed Kamel Leilah

Personal details
- Born: 27 January 1925 Tamiya, Faiyum Governorate, Kingdom of Egypt
- Died: 21 February 2008 (aged 83) Kuala Lumpur, Malaysia
- Spouse: Wafeya el Otefi
- Children: 4
- Education: Cairo University, University of Paris, Sapienza University of Rome

Sufi Abu Taleb (Arabic: صوفي أبو طالب, romanized: Ṣūfī Abū Ṭālib; January 27, 1925 – February 21, 2008) was an Egyptian politician who served as the 6th speaker of the People's Assembly of Egypt from 1978 to 1983 and, following the assassination of Anwar Sadat on 6 October 1981, assumed the duties of acting head of state for eight days per the Egyptian Constitution. He subsequently stepped aside for Sadat's Vice-President Hosni Mubarak.

== Early life ==
Abu Taleb was born in Tamiya in Faiyum Governorate. Upon completion of high school, he joined the Faculty of Law at Cairo University, where he received a bachelor's degree in 1946. He received also a diploma in Public Law in 1947, and in 1948 he was given a scholarship and sent to France and joined the University of Paris where he received a diploma in History of Law and Roman Law in 1949 and a diploma in Private Law in 1950. In 1957 he obtained his Ph.D., his thesis winning the University Award. In 1959, he received a diploma in Laws of Mediterranean Sea from Sapienza University of Rome.

He served as President of Cairo University, as a member of the Islamic Research Academy and founded Fayoum University.

== Politics ==
In 1978, Abu Taleb was elected Speaker of the People's Assembly. When President Anwar El Sadat was assassinated on 6 October 1981, Abu Taleb became Acting President, as the Egyptian constitution ruled that the Speaker would assume that role in the case of a vacancy of the presidential office, pending an election in 60 days. Not being considered a serious candidate for the presidency, he stepped aside after just eight days in favor of Vice-President Hosni Mubarak.

Previous Posts:

1. Speaker of the People's Assembly of Egypt elected since November 1978
2. Member elected of the People's Assembly and Chairman of the Committee of Scientific Researches since 1976.
3. Vice President of Cairo University 1973–1975.
4. Legal Advisor to Cairo University 1967–1973.
5. Legal Advisor to Assiout University 1965–1967.
6. Head of History and Philosophy of Law Department, Cairo University 1958–1965.
7. Professorial Chair of Law (Roman Law Department Cairo University).
8. Dr. Abou-Taleb exerted important efforts to introduce Legal Studies in the Faculty of Islamic Law, El-Azhar University.
9. He shared with other professors in the introduction of legislation and Islamic Law in Kuwait and Yemen (Kuwait University and Sanaa University) (both branches became separate Faculties later).
10. He was nominated as Egyptian President after President Sadat's assassination.

Other Occupations:

- Head of History of Law Committee.
- Deputy Chairman of the Young Moslem's Association.
- Deputy Chairman of the Conference on Islamic Education in Mecca.
- Member of the Higher Council of Arts and Literature.
- Member of the Board of Directors of the Legislation and Economics Association.
- Secretary of the Students Welfare Association.
- Member of the Board of Directors of the Islamic Studies Institute.
- Member of the National Council of Education.
- Member of the National Academy of Scientific Research and Technology.
- Member of the Egyptian Academy of Science.
- Member of Police Academy Council.
- Member of the Supreme Ministerial Committee for the Sudanese-Egyptian Political and Economics Federation.
- Dr. Abou-Taleb is a member of the National Democratic Party's Constituent Committee.

== Honours ==
=== National honours ===
- Grand Collar of the Order of the Nile (1983).
- Grand Cordon of the Order of the Arab Republic of Egypt (1978).
- First class of the Order of Sciences and Arts (Egypt).

=== Foreign honours ===
- Commander of the Order of La Pléiade (Canada).
- Knight of the Legion of Honour (France, 1977).
- Grand Cordon Order of the Two Niles (Sudan, 1982).

== Death ==
Sufi Abu Taleb died on February 21, 2008, in Malaysia at the age of 83. He had been visiting Malaysia for an alumni reunion for graduates of Cairo's al-Azhar University.

== Family ==
He had 2 sons and 2 daughters and many grandchildren. His son, Ahmad Sufi Abu Taleb, is an independent politician who ran in the 2000 parliamentary elections, facing in his district Tamia, Fayoum the NDP's veteran MP Hussein Eweiss. The Abu Taleb family used to be Tamia's deputies for more than 30 years.

Books research and other publications:

1. Appliance of Roman Law in Egypt (at the time of the Roman Empire)(Cairo, 1955).
2. Comparative study of Islamic Law and Roman Law (Cairo, 1956).
3. Autonomy of Will in Roman Law (Cairo, 1963).
4. Resumee in Roman Law (Cairo, 1964).
5. History of Law Principles (Cairo, 1965).
6. Arab Society (Cairo, 1965).
7. Hor Moheb Law, jointly with Professor Bahor Labib, 1971.
8. History of Legal Procedures and Social Systems (Cairo, 1972).
9. Studies in Arab Nationalism (Cairo, 1972).
10. International Private Law (Nationality in Egyptian and Lebanese Laws) (Beirut, 1972).
11. History of Social and Jurisdiction Rules (Cairo, 1973).
12. Appliance of the Islamic Law in Arabic Countries (Cairo, 1974).
13. Comparative Study of Egyptian Socialism-Democratic and Islamic and International theories (1977).

In French:

- Periculum Rei Venditae in Roman and Islamic Laws (Paris, 1952).
- Legal Status of Women in Arab Countries (Beirut, 1972).

Political offices
Preceded by Sayed Marey	Speaker of the People's Assembly of Egypt; 1978–1983	Succeeded by Dr. Mohamed Kamel Leilah
Preceded by Anwar El Sadat	Acting President of Egypt; 1981	Succeeded by Hosni Mubarak
