= Farouk Sultan =

Egyptian lawyer

Farouk Sultan فاروق سلطان

President of the Supreme Constitutional Court of Egypt
- In office 25 July 2009 – 30 June 2012
- Appointed by: Hosni Mubarak
- Preceded by: Mamdouh Marei
- Succeeded by: Maher El-Beheiry

Personal details
- Born: 1941 (age 84–85)
- Profession: Attorney

Farouk Ahmed Sultan (Arabic: فاروق سلطان; born 1941) was President of the Supreme Constitutional Court of Egypt, the highest judicial court in Egypt. He was appointed in 2009 by President Hosni Mubarak, and succeeded by Maher El-Beheiry in 2012.

Sultan's appointment was questioned by outside observers, who argued that he lacked experience in constitutional law, and that much of his experience was in military courts and state security courts. It was argued that his appointment was meant to place an ally of Mubarak at the head of the Supreme Constitutional Court in advance of the 2011 presidential election.

In the aftermath of the 2011 Egyptian revolution, it was announced that Sultan would be a part of the interim government, along with the Supreme Council of the Armed Forces. His role in the government was not immediately clear.

As president of the electoral commission, Farouk Sultan announced the results of the 2012 presidential elections on 24 June. Maher El-Beheiry succeeded him as Chief Justice of the Supreme Constitutional Court on 1 July 2012.

Legal offices
Preceded by Mamdouh Marei	President of the Supreme Constitutional Court of Egypt; 2009–2012	Succeeded by Maher El-Beheiry
