= Sami Farag =

Egyptian lawyer and judge

Sami Farag Youssef
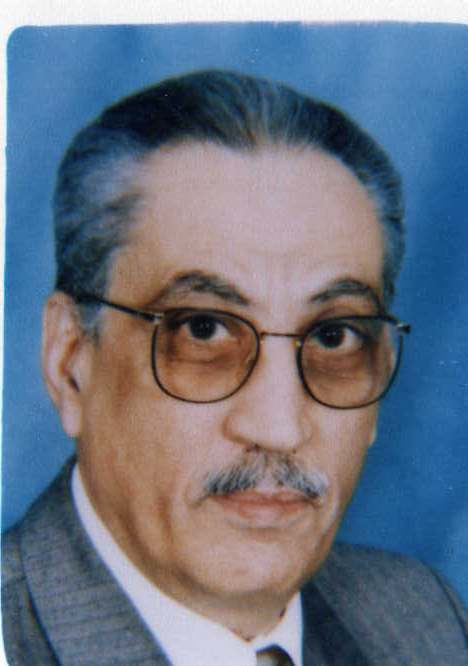
- Born: September 1, 1935; Nazlet El Seman, Giza, Egypt
- Died: February 21, 2015 (aged 79); Anglo-American Hospital, Zamalek, Cairo, Egypt
- Occupations: Lawyer, Judge, Prosecutor
- Known for: Being Vice-President of the Supreme Constitutional Court of Egypt

Sami Farag Youssef (Coptic: ⲥⲁⲙⲓ ⲫⲁⲣⲁⲅ ⲓⲱⲥⲏⲫ; September 1, 1935 – February 21, 2015) was an Egyptian lawyer, judge, prosecutor and Vice-President of the Supreme Constitutional Court of Egypt. He was viewed by many as one of the most influential Copts in modern history.

== Early life ==
He was born in Nazlet El Seman in the Giza province. He later studied law at Cairo University.

== Career ==
He held the following offices:

- Independent lawyer till February 1962.
- Legal adviser to Banque Misr till September 1965.
- Deputy General Prosecutor (1965-1973)
- Judge and court president (1973-1981)
- Prosecuting attorney in Faiyum (1981-1982)
- Judge at the court of appeals (1982-1986)
- Judge at the court of cassation (1986-1989)
- Vice-President of the court of cassation (1989)
- Vice-President of the Supreme Constitutional court of Egypt (1990-1999)

He is the person to have served the longest term (nine years) at the position of Vice-President of the Supreme Constitutional court of Egypt.

In 1995 he was appointed by President Mubarak to serve temporarily in the General Congregation Council of the Coptic Church. He was a very close and trusted friend of Pope Shenouda III. He would serve sometimes as the liaison between the government and the Church's leadership.

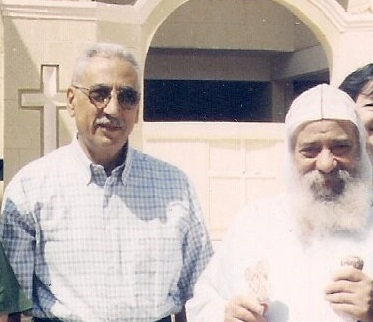
Judge Sami Farag with Pope Shenouda III.

He represented Egypt 5 times at the Congress of the Conference of European Constitutional Courts. In the 1996 Conference that was held in Budapest, his performance convinced the President of the Congress to name Egypt as an observant member at the Conference of European Constitutional Courts.

During his term at the Supreme Constitutional Court, he oversaw many cases involving the President of the Republic, the government and the Coptic Pope.

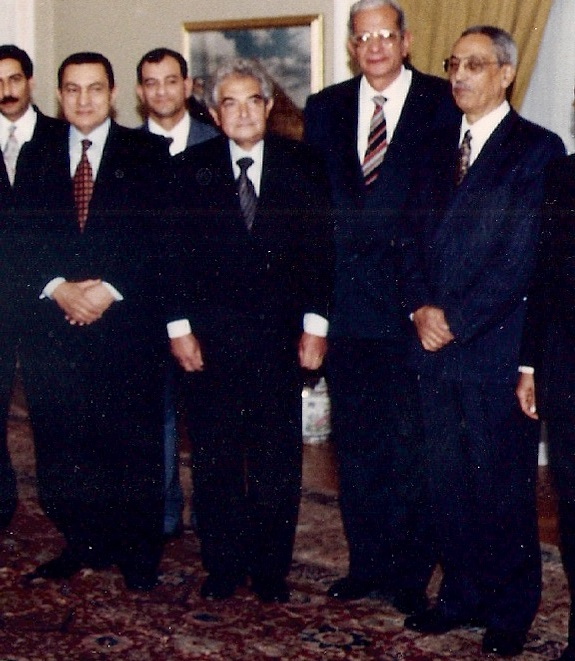
Judge Sami Farag (R) at the Presidential Palace after a closed meeting with former president Hosni Mubarak (L).

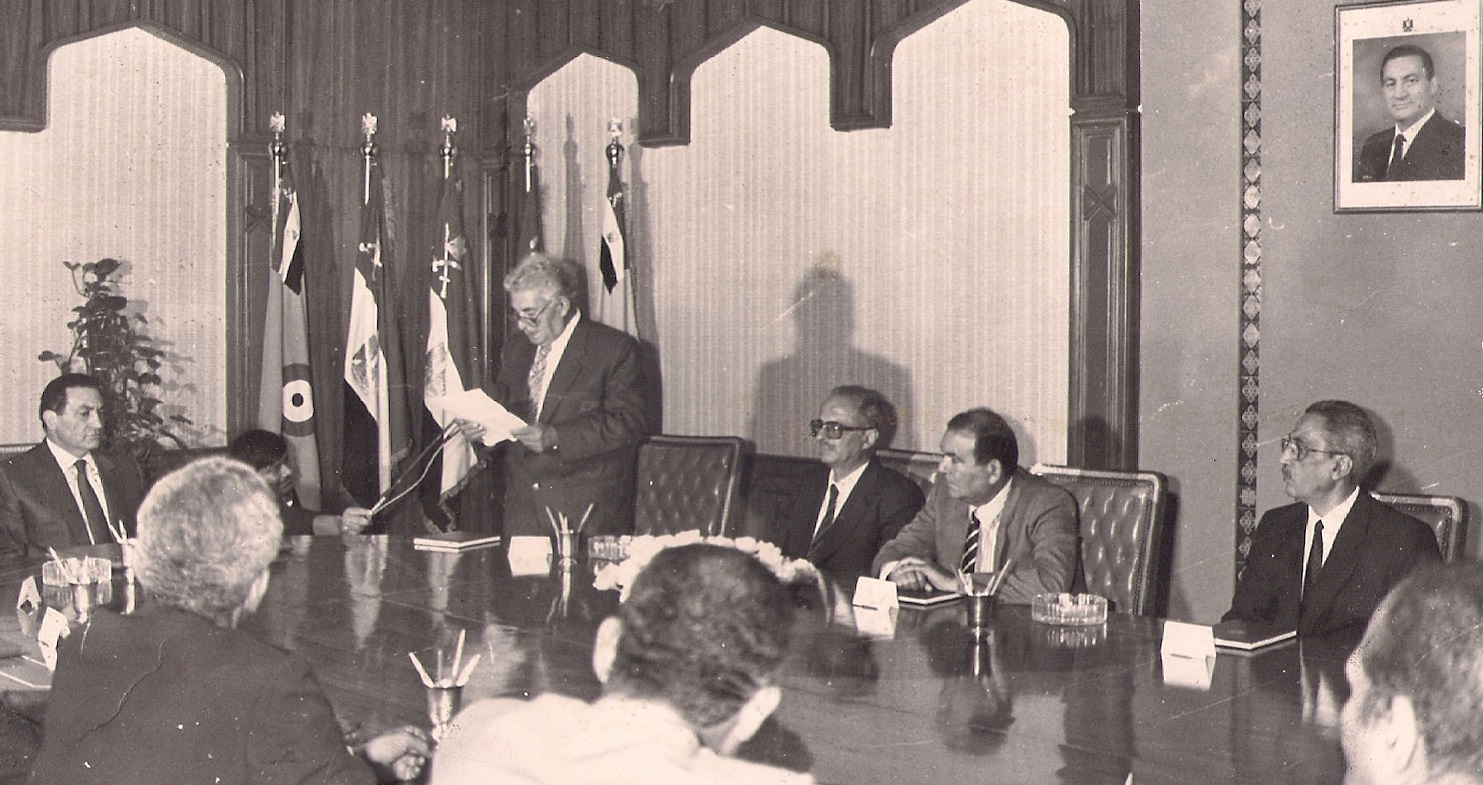
Judge Sami Farag (R) representing the Egyptian judiciary system in a cabinet meeting with former President Hosni Mubarak (L).

He trained and was the mentor of Egyptian President Adly Mansour.

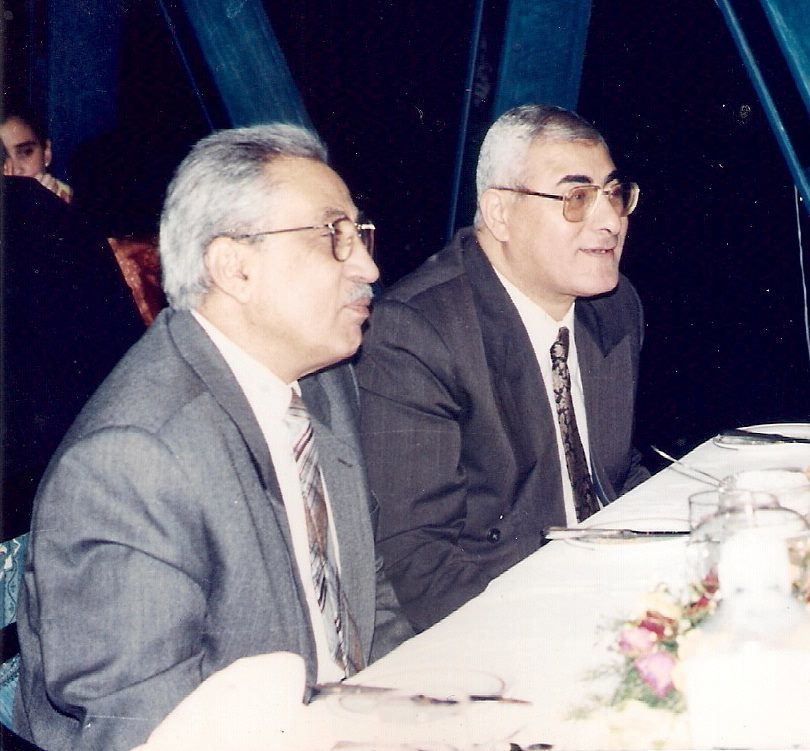
Judge Sami Farag with former President of the Republic Adly Mansour

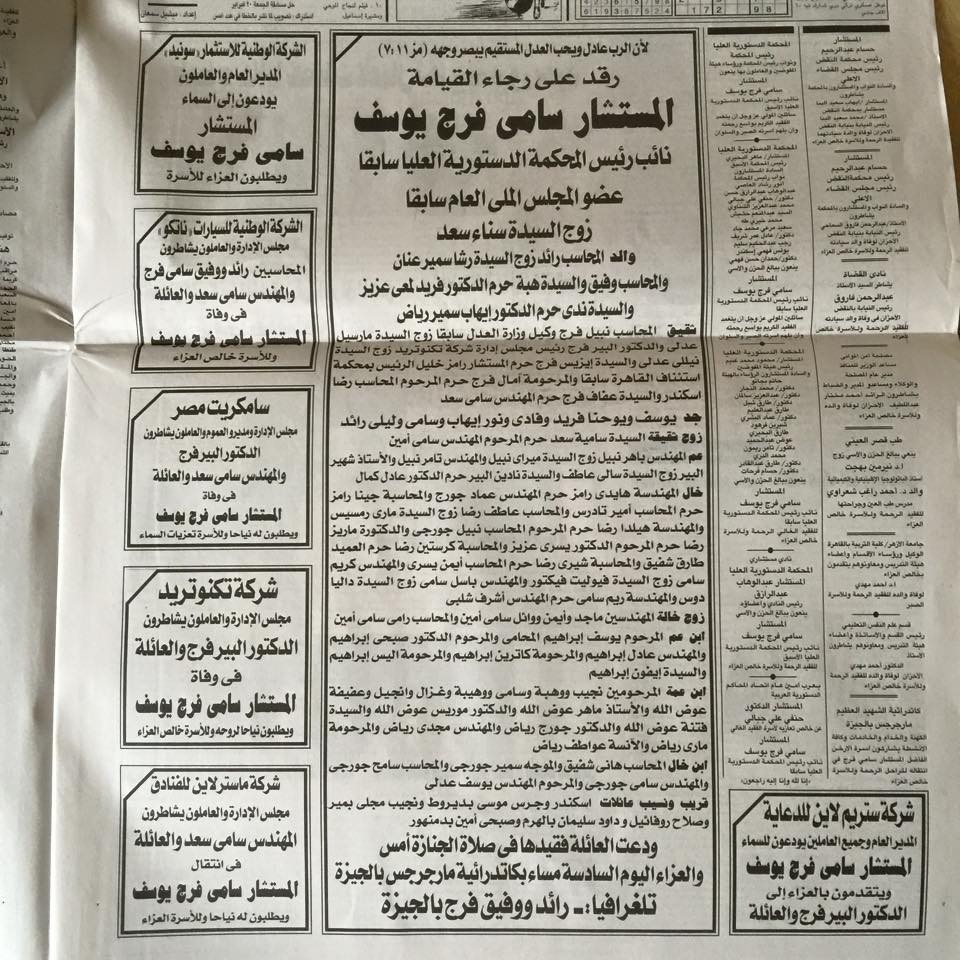
Sami Farag's obituary at El-Ahram state newspaper.

== Personal life ==
Sami Farag was the father of two sons and two daughters. He also left six grandchildren.

== Death ==
On February 21, 2015, he died at the Anglo-American Hospital in Zamalek, Cairo.

President Abdel Fattah el-Sisi couldn't attend the funeral, so he sent General Mohamed Rostom to represent him instead.

Pope Tawadros II of Alexandria said after his death that Sami Farag was "a pious and great judge, a loyal servant to his church and his country."
