= El Mostafa Higazy =

Egyptian philosopher

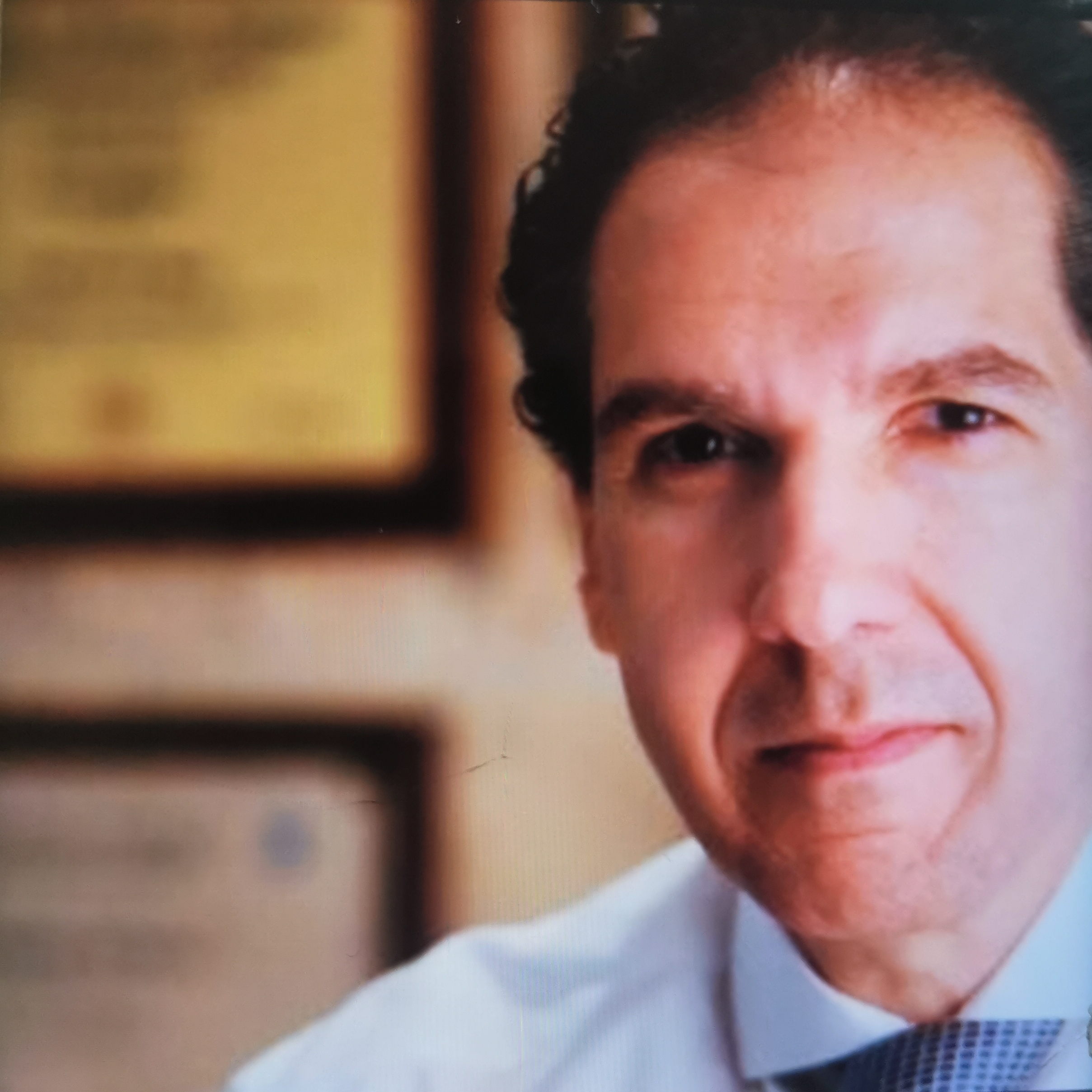
El Mostafa Higazy

El Mostafa Higazy is an Egyptian philosopher who served as a political advisor to interim President Adly Mansour. He is also the founder of the Nasaq Foundation, an Egyptian think tank focused on issues of justice.

== Biography ==
Higazy studied engineering at USC, eventually earning a PhD in engineering and Strategic Management from USC. He founded NASAQ Foundation as a socio-political think tank, and subsequently founded ACME Corp as an economic arm of NASAQ.

Higazy received much notice for his role as Mansour's political advisor, proving himself a charismatic spokesman.
