= Abdel-Wahab Abdel-Razeq =

Egyptian judge and senate president (born 1948)

Abdel Wahab Abdel Razeq
- عبد الوهاب عبد الرازق
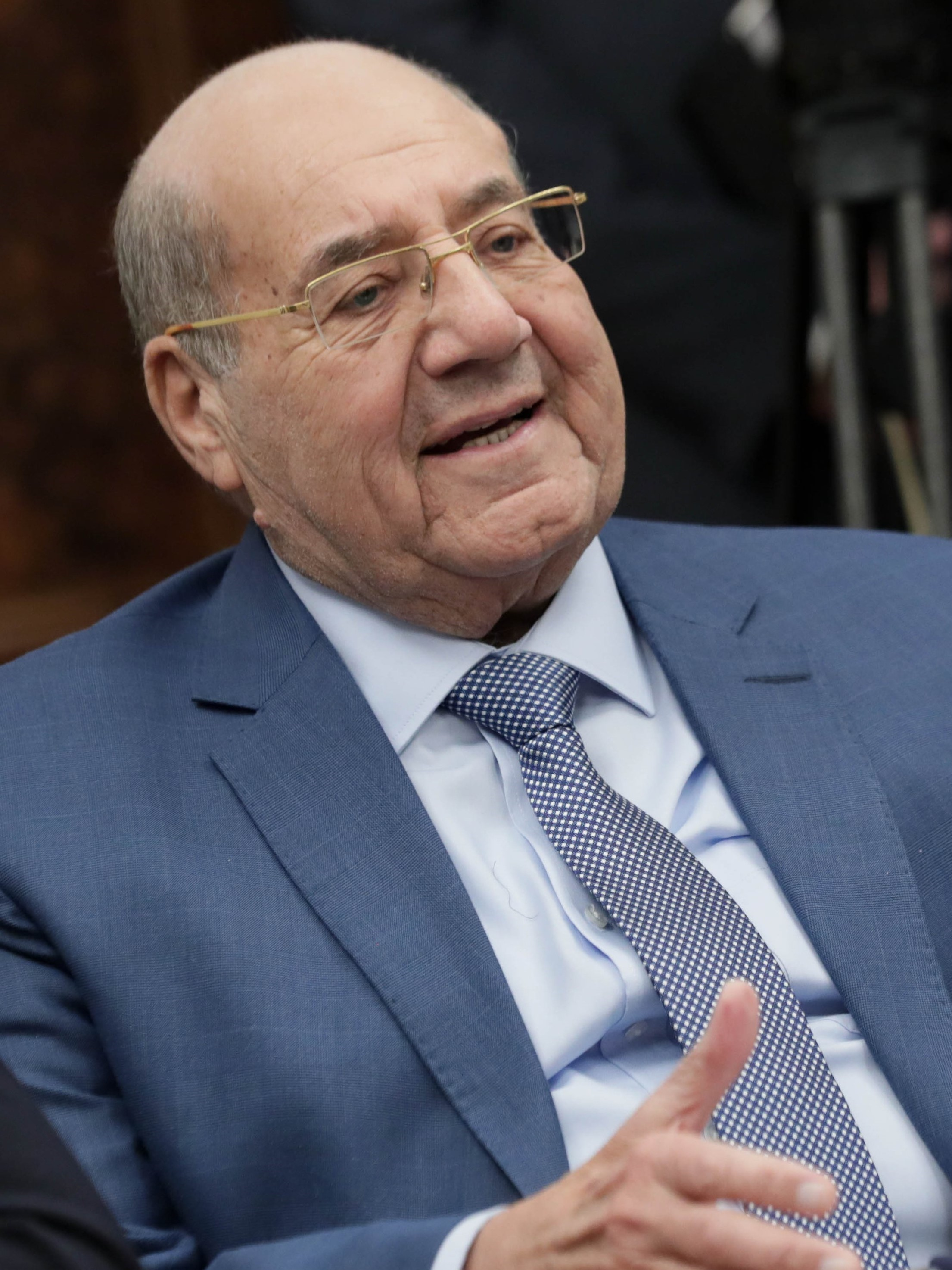
- Abdel Razeq in 2021

President of the Senate
- In office 18 October 2020 – 18 October 2025
- Deputy: Bahaa El-Din Abu Shoka; Phoebe Fawzi
- Preceded by: Established
- Succeeded by: Essam El-Din Farid

Chancellor of Supreme Constitutional Court
- Counselor
- In office 29 May 2016 – June 2018
- Preceded by: Adly Mansour
- Succeeded by: Hanafy El Gebaly

Chairman of the Nation's Future Party
- Incumbent
- Assumed office 2020
- Deputy: Hossam El-Khouly
- Preceded by: Ashraf Rashad

Personal details
- Born: 1948 (age 77–78) Minya, Egypt
- Party: Nation's Future Party
- Education: Cairo University

Abdel Wahab Abdel Razeq (Arabic: عبد الوهاب عبد الرازق, born 1948) is the leader of the Nation's Future Party. He is also a member of the Egyptian senate who served as the senate president from 18 October 2020 to 18 October 2025. He was Chancellor of the Supreme Constitutional Court from 2016 until 2018.

== Early life ==
Abdel Razek was born 1948 in Minya, he earned his bachelor's degree in law from Cairo University in 1969.

== Career ==
He was appointed assistant prosecutor in the Accountability State Authority in 1971; he became the permanent secretary to Attorney General in the Ministry of Justice and also deputy secretary in the State Council in 1987. He became a prosecutor in the State Council in 1989. He was also the legal consultant to the Kuwaiti Cabinet from 1992 to 1998 and became the adviser to commissioners authority of the Supreme Constitutional Court until 1994, at which point which became the head of the authority. He was appointed deputy Chancellor of Supreme Constitutional Court in 2011.

He became Chancellor of the Court in May 2016 after serving as the deputy since 2011; he left in June 2018 after a two-year term.

He joined the Supreme Constitutional Court in 2011 as deputy, he was appointed as alternative to his predecessor due to an age limit retirement in May 2016, he was appointed under 2014 Constitution Article 193. As a courts panel commissioners member, he was among the judges who were in favour of dissolving the 2012 parliament, which at the time was mostly occupied by the Freedom and Justice Party and Salafists from the Nour Party. Still in the court, he also issued rulings in favour of invalidating the political disenfranchisement law of the old Shura Council that was controlled by the Freedom and Justice Party.

He is also the chairman of the Nation's Future Party chosen by the party members of the Parliament. He served as a member of the 2014 Presidential Elections Committee.

He received 287 votes of 300 cast in an October 2020 vote to determine the Senate speaker.

Political offices
Preceded by established	President of the Senate; 18 October 2020 – present	Current holder

Political offices
Preceded by Ashraf Rasha	Chairman of the Nation's Future Party; 2020 – present	Current holder

Political offices
Preceded by Adly Mansour	Chancellor of Supreme Constitutional Court; May 2016 – June 2018	Succeeded by Hanafy El Gebaly
