= Adly Mansour =

Interim President of Egypt (2013–2014)

- عدلى محمود منصور
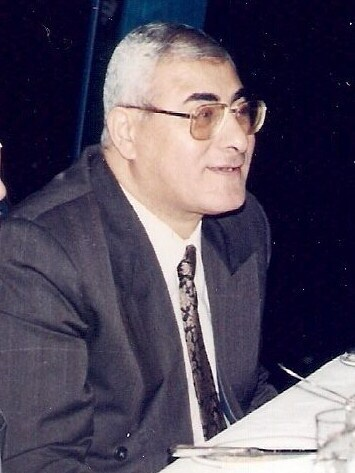
- Mansour in 2005

Interim President of Egypt
- In office 4 July 2013 – 8 June 2014
- Prime Minister: Hazem Al Beblawi; Ibrahim Mahlab
- Vice President: Mohamed ElBaradei (interim); Vacant
- Preceded by: Mohamed Morsi
- Succeeded by: Abdel Fattah el-Sisi

President of the Supreme Constitutional Court of Egypt
- In office 1 July 2013 – 30 June 2016
- Appointed by: Mohamed Morsi
- Preceded by: Maher El-Beheiry
- Succeeded by: Abdel Wahab Abdel Razek

Personal details
- Born: 23 December 1945 (age 80) Cairo, Kingdom of Egypt
- Party: Independent
- Children: 3
- Education: Cairo University; École nationale d'administration

Adly Mahmoud Mansour (Arabic: عدلى محمود منصور, romanized: ʻAdlī Maḥmūd Manṣūr, pronounced [ˈʕædli mæħˈmuːd mɑnˈsˤuːɾ]; born 23 December 1945) is an Egyptian judge and politician who served as the president (or chief justice) of the Supreme Constitutional Court of Egypt. He also served as interim president of Egypt from 4 July 2013 to 8 June 2014 following the 2013 Egyptian coup d'état by the military which deposed President Mohamed Morsi. Several secular and religious figures, such as the Grand Imam of al-Azhar (Ahmed el-Tayeb), the Coptic Pope (Tawadros II), and Mohamed ElBaradei supported the coup against President Morsi and the military appointed Mansour interim-president until an election could take place. Morsi refused to acknowledge his removal as valid and continued to maintain that only he could be considered the legitimate President of Egypt. Mansour was sworn into office in front of the Supreme Constitutional Court on 4 July 2013.

== Early life and education ==
Mansour was born in Cairo. He graduated from Cairo University Law School in 1967, earned a postgraduate degree in law in 1969, studied economics and earned a postgraduate degree in management science from Cairo University in 1970. He later attended France's École nationale d'administration (ENA) and graduated in 1977.

Mansour spent six years in Saudi Arabia in the 1980s, working as an adviser to the Saudi Ministry of Commerce.

== Term on Supreme Constitutional Court ==
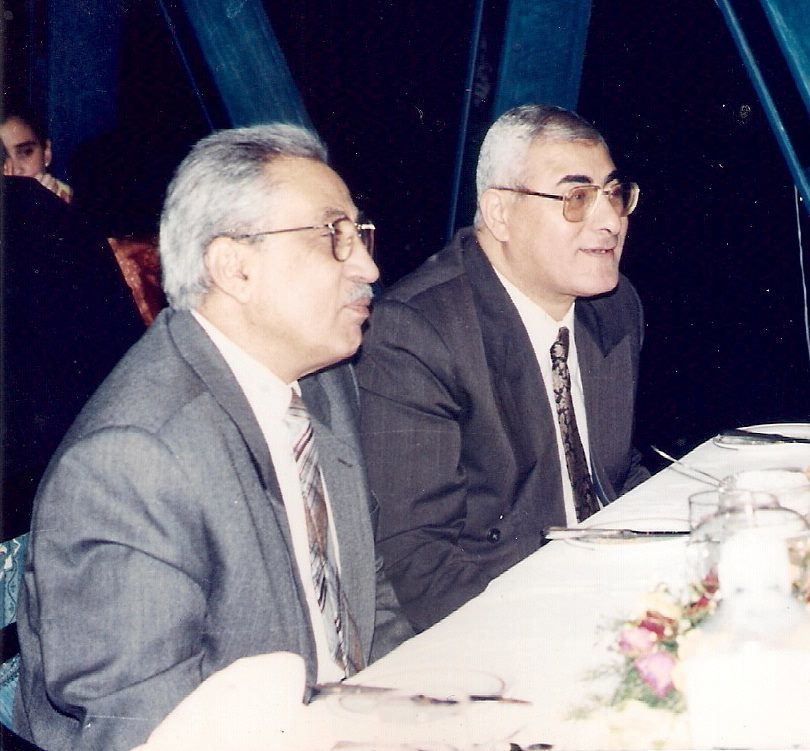
Mansour with his mentor and Vice-President of the Supreme Constitutional Court at the time Judge Sami Farag, 2005

Mansour was appointed to the Supreme Constitutional Court in 1992. He later served as Vice President of the Supreme Constitutional Court of Egypt until 1 July 2013, when he became President of the SCC following his appointment to the position by President Morsi on 19 May.

Mansour did not have the opportunity to swear the oath as president of the SCC until 4 July 2013, right before he swore the presidential oath.

On 30 June 2016, Abdel Wahab Abdel Razek replaced him in the post.

== Interim President of Egypt ==
On 3 July 2013, Mansour was named interim President of Egypt following the ousting of Mohamed Morsi in the 2013 Egyptian coup d'état subsequent to the 2012–13 Egyptian protests. His appointment was announced on television by the minister of defense Abdel Fattah el-Sisi. Earlier, there was brief confusion as to who exactly was appointed interim president, with some sources suggesting it was the former President of the Supreme Constitutional Court, Maher El-Beheiry. Mansour was sworn in on 4 July 2013.

He briefly restored the position of the Vice President, which was abolished with the adoption of the current constitution on 26 December 2012, and nominated opposition leader Mohammed ElBaradei to the post in an acting capacity on 7 July 2013. On 8 July, Mansour issued a decree that proposed the introduction of amendments to the suspended constitution and a referendum to endorse them, followed by national elections. On 9 July, Mansour appointed the economist Hazem el-Biblawi as acting prime minister.

Mansour made his first trip abroad as Interim President on 8 October 2013, to Saudi Arabia, a key backer of the ousting of Morsi.

On 19 September 2013, Mansour announced that he would not run for the presidency, saying that he would return to his position as the head of the constitutional court.

== Personal life ==
He is married and has a son and two daughters.

Political offices
Preceded by Mohamed Morsi	President of Egypt; Interim; 2013–2014	Succeeded by Abdel Fattah el-Sisi
