= Hisham Badawy =

Egyptian politician

- هشام بدوي

13th Speaker of the House of Representatives of Egypt
- Incumbent
- Assumed office 12 January 2026
- Preceded by: Hanafy El Gebaly

Head of the Central Auditing Organization
- President: Abdel Fattah el-Sisi
- Preceded by: Hisham Genena
- Succeeded by: Mohammad Al-Faisal
- In office 2016–2024

Personal details
- Born: 1950 (age 75–76)
- Education: Cairo University

Hisham Badawy (Arabic: هشام بدوي) is an Egyptian politician. He has been serving as the 13th speaker of the House of Representatives of Egypt since January 2026.

== Early life ==
He graduated from the Faculty of Law at Cairo University in 1980.

== Career ==
Badawy served as the head of the Central Auditing Organization from 2016 to 2024.

Badawy was appointed to the Egyptian House of Representatives by Egyptian president Abdel-Fattah El-Sisi on 11 January 2026. He was elected Speaker of the House the following day, defeating Egyptian Social Democratic Party representative Mahmoud Sami El-Imam.

| Preceded by Hanafy El Gebaly | Speaker of the House of Representatives; 2026–present | Incumbent |
