= Ahmad Fathi Sorour =

Egyptian politician (1932–2024)

- احمد فتحى سرور
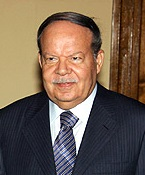
- Sorour in 2005

9th Speaker of the People's Assembly of Egypt
- In office 13 December 1990 – 13 February 2011
- Appointed by: People's Assembly
- President: Hosni Mubarak; Mohamed Hussein Tantawi ( as Chairman of the Supreme Council of the Armed Forces of Egypt)
- Prime Minister: Atef Sedki; Kamal Ganzouri; Atef Ebeid; Ahmed Nazif; Ahmed Shafik
- Preceded by: Rifaat el-Mahgoub
- Succeeded by: Saad El-Katatni (2012)

Personal details
- Born: 9 July 1932 Qena Governorate, Kingdom of Egypt
- Died: 5 April 2024 (aged 91)
- Awards: Order of the Two Niles

Ahmad Fathi Sorour (Arabic: احمد فتحى سرور; 9 July 1932 – 5 April 2024) was an Egyptian politician who served as the 9th speaker of the People's Assembly of Egypt from 1990 until the Egyptian Revolution of 2011. Previously he had served in the government as Minister of Education from 1986 to 1990.

Sorour was first elected to the People's Assembly in April 1989, and he was elected as Speaker in November 1990. He was President of the Council of the Inter-Parliamentary Union in 1994–1997 and also served as President of the Union of African Parliaments in 1990–1991. According to Article 84 of the Egyptian Constitution, Sorour, as Speaker of the People's Assembly, was first in the order of succession to become President of Egypt if the President died, became incapacitated, or resigned. Upon the resignation of Hosni Mubarak in 2011, however, the military, headed by Mohamed Hussein Tantawi, assumed control of the state.

== Early life ==
Sorour was born in July 1932 in Qena Governorate in Upper Egypt. He studied law at Cairo University and obtained a doctorate in criminal law. Later on he obtained a master's degree in law from the University of Michigan in the United States of America.

== Allegations and controversies ==
=== Allegations of non-compliance with the judiciary ===
Sorour was widely criticized for article 93 of the Egyptian Constitution: "The parliament is the master of its decisions", meaning that the parliament could make a decision about its membership regardless of any judicial decisions. This article caused significant concerns amidst allegations that parliamentary elections were repeatedly and systematically rigged. Sorour continued to assert that the parliament was the competent authority to decide the validity of its memberships despite the widely acknowledged allegations of rigging. Following the Egyptian revolution of 2011 Sorour's parliament was dissolved and article 93 was referred for revision.

=== 2011 revolution ===
In the aftermath of the revolution in Egypt (25 January 2011 – 11 February 2011) the Supreme Military Council, led by Field Marshal Mohamed Hussein Tantawi, was appointed to the position of Acting President. The Supreme Military Council dissolved the Egyptian Parliament which was headed by Sorour. This came following widespread allegations that the elections leading to this parliament, headed by Sorour, were rigged. On 14 February 2011, the Egyptian daily news Alwafd reported that the ruling military authorities opted to prosecute a senior member of Sorour's team for allegedly burning confidential documents in Sorour's office. The same newspaper reported that a restraining order was issued preventing Sorour from entering the parliament building following allegations of smuggling undisclosed documents from the building. Sorour was seen as one of the figures that caused the fall of Mubarak's rule. Some believed that Mubarak's mistake was that he increasingly gave too much latitude to his son's cabal, including Ahmad Fathi Sorour, among others.

Fathi Sorour openly supported measures taken to crack down on the pro-democracy demonstrations in Egypt. In a televised interview with Elmehwar TV in January 2011, Sorour was asked for an opinion on the US disapproval of the Egyptian authorities' action: disconnecting internet services in an attempt to halt the demonstrations. Sorour replied that the US "did more than that when it was subjected to terrorism", portraying some similarity between pro-democracy demonstrators in Egypt and the terrorists who attacked the United States. Sorour subsequently stated that he didn't view the pro-democracy demonstrators as terrorists.

== Death ==
Sorour died on 5 April 2024, at the age of 91.

Parliament of Egypt
Preceded by Rifaat el-Mahgoub	Speaker of the People's Assembly; 1990–2011	Vacant Title next held by Saad El-Katatni
