= Boulos Fahmy =

Boulos Fahmy Iskandar
- بولس فهمي إسكندر

Chief Justice of the Supreme Constitutional Court
- Incumbent
- Assumed office 9 February 2022
- Preceded by: Saeed Marie

Personal details
- Born: 1 January 1957 (age 69) Cairo, Egypt
- Education: Cairo University

Boulos Fahmy Iskandar (born 1 January 1957) is an Egyptian lawyer and the current Chief Justice of the Supreme Constitutional Court of Egypt.

== Professional life ==
After legal studies, Boulos became a public prosecutor in 1978. He worked in various roles, rising to Advisor to the Cairo Appeal Court in 1997. He was made the Undersecretary of the Judicial Inspection at the Public Prosecution in 1998, then First Undersecretary of the Judicial Inspection in 2001, and then the Technical Adviser to the Minister of Justice in 2006.

He also served as Assistant Minister of Justice for Administrative and Financial Development Affairs and Judicial Claims in 2007, the Head of the South Cairo and Helwan Primary Courts in 2013, and the supervisor on the General Secretariat of the Supreme Constitutional Court to date in 2014.

Boulos was appointed as vice-president of the Supreme Constitutional Court in 2010, then left when the 2012 Constitution was enacted, to be head of the Cairo Court of Appeal. Boulos was re-appointed as vice-president of the Supreme Constitutional Court in 2014.

Following the retirement of his predecessor, Boulos was sworn into his current role on 9 February 2022 by the President of Egypt, Abdel Fattah El-Sisi in accordance with Republican Decree No. 51 of 2022. The role carries the rank of Minister of the government.

== Personal life ==
Boulos is an ethnic Copt, following the Coptic Orthodox Church.
