= Tamiya, Egypt =

Tamiya طامية
- Town
- Location in Egypt
- Coordinates: 29.478011°N 30.957384°E
- Country: Egypt
- Governorate: Faiyum

Area
  - Total: 379.1 km^{2} (146.4 sq mi)

Population (2021)
  - Total: 487,150
  - Density: 1,285/km^{2} (3,328/sq mi)
- Time zone: UTC+2 (EET)
  - Summer (DST): UTC+3 (EEST)

Tamiya (Arabic: طامية) is a town in Faiyum Governorate, Egypt.

The name of the town comes from Ancient Greek: Ταμαυις or Ταμαις.

== Notable people ==
- Sufi Abu Taleb
