= Mohamed Kamel Leilah =

Egyptian law professor (1923–1987)

Kamel Leilah
- محمد كامل ليلة

7th Speaker of the People's Assembly of Egypt
- In office 5 November 1983 – 22 June 1984
- Appointed by: People's Assembly
- President: Hosni Mubarak
- Prime Minister: Ahmad Fuad Mohieddin
- Preceded by: Sufi Abu Taleb
- Succeeded by: Rifaat el-Mahgoub

Personal details
- Born: 30 January 1923
- Died: 30 August 1987 (aged 64)

Dr. Mohamed Kamel Leilah (30 January 1923 – 30 August 1987) was an Egyptian law professor, who served as the 7th speaker of the People's Assembly of Egypt from 1983 to 1984.
