= Saad El-Katatni =

Egyptian politician (born 1952)

- سعد الكتاتني
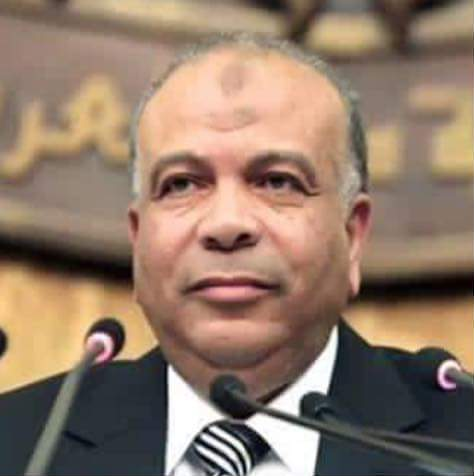
- El-Katatni in 2013

Chairman of the Freedom and Justice Party
- Incumbent
- Assumed office 19 October 2012
- Preceded by: Mohamed Morsi

10th Speaker of the People's Assembly of Egypt
- In office 23 January 2012 – 22 September 2012
- Appointed by: People's Assembly
- President: Mohamed Hussein Tantawi ( as Chairman of the Supreme Council of the Armed Forces of Egypt); Mohamed Morsi
- Prime Minister: Kamal Ganzouri; Hesham Qandil
- Preceded by: Ahmad Fathi Sorour (2011)
- Succeeded by: Ali Abdel Aal (2016)

Secretary-General of the Freedom and Justice Party
- In office 30 April 2011 – 22 January 2012
- Preceded by: Position established
- Succeeded by: Hussein Mohamed Ibrahim

Personal details
- Born: Mohamed Saad Tawfik El-Katatni; 4 March 1952 (age 74) Girga, Egypt
- Party: Freedom and Justice Party
- Education: Minya University
- Profession: Academic

Saad El-Katatni (Arabic: سعد الكتاتني, alternatively spelled El-Katatny or Al-Katatni; born 4 March 1952) is an Egyptian Islamist politician who has been the chairman of the Freedom and Justice Party (FJP) since October 2012. He served as the 10th speaker of the People's Assembly of Egypt and was the first after the Egyptian Revolution of 2011 From January 2012 until its dissolution in September. Prior to this, he served as the first secretary-general of the FJP and was a member of the Guidance Bureau of the Muslim Brotherhood.

== Early life and education ==
El-Katatni was born on 4 March 1952. He completed his undergraduate studies of botany at the Assiut University with a BSc degree in 1974. After one year of military conscription, he continued his studies, specialising in microbiology and taking his master's degree in 1979. After four more years of study at the Minya University, concurrently with the work as an assistant lecturer, he was conferred a doctorate in microbiology (physiological plant pathology). Subsequently, he worked as a lecturer at the same university. In 1991 he was promoted to become associate professor. In 2004, he got a full professorship.

== Political career ==
From 2005 to 2010, El-Katatni led the parliamentary bloc of the Muslim Brotherhood. Later, he served on the guidance bureau of the group. When the Muslim Brotherhood founded the Freedom and Justice Party on 30 April 2011, El-Katatni was chosen as the secretary-general of the party. Therefore, he retired from the guidance bureau.

On 22 January 2012, he resigned as FJP secretary to become elected as the Speaker of the People's Assembly of Egypt the next day. He received 399 votes, 80 percent of the 498 votes cast.

On 19 October 2012, the FJP selected him to serve as the party's chairman. At the time, the FJP is Egypt's largest political party and controls 47% of Egypt's lower house of parliament's seats.

== Political views ==
After he was selected as the FJP's party's chairman, Katatni expressed his desire to implement Islamic Sharia law in Egypt, saying that the FJP was established by the Muslim Brotherhood in order to represent the Brotherhood's "political project, which, in the end, will be a wise government that will institute Islamic Shari’a law." Katani declared his election as the first step toward achieving the FJP's goals.

== Arrest ==
In the aftermath of the 2013 Egyptian coup d'état, El-Katatni was arrested on 4 July 2013. Egyptian prosecutor general Hisham Barakat ordered his assets to be frozen on 14 July 2013. On 29 October 2013, a three-judge panel at Cairo Criminal Court stepped down from the proceedings, citing "uneasiness" over the trial. On 11 December 2013, a second panel of judges withdrew from the trial. He was sentenced to life imprisonment in February 2015, a decision that was overturned in November 2016. As of September 2019, El-Katatni remains in custody pending retrial.

Political offices
Vacant Title last held by Ahmad Fathi Sorour	Speaker of the People's Assembly; 2012	Vacant Title next held by Ali Abdel Aal as Speaker of the House of Representatives
