= List of constituencies in Egypt =

The following is a list of constituencies (electoral districts) of Egypt.

== 2012 list (by governorate) ==
=== Party list constituencies ===
==== Cairo ====
- First District of Cairo (10 members)
- Second District of Cairo (8 members)
- Third District of Cairo (8 members)
- Fourth District of Cairo (10 members)

==== Alexandria ====
- First District of Alexandria (6 members)
- Second District of Alexandria (10 members)

==== Port Said ====
- District of Port Said (4 members)

==== Ismailia ====
- Ismailia (4 members)

==== Suez ====
- Suez (4 members)

==== Qalyubiya ====
- First District of Qalyubiya (4 members)
- Second District of Qalyubiya (8 members)

==== Sharquiya ====
- First District of Sharquiya (10 members)
- Second District of Sharquiya (10 members)

==== Daqahliya ====
- First District of Daqahliya (8 members)
- Second District of Daqahliya (8 members)
- Third District of Daqahliya (8 members)

==== Damietta ====
- Damietta (8 members)

==== Kafr el-Sheikh ====
- First District of Kafr el-Sheikh (8 members)
- Second District of Kafr el-Sheikh (4 members)

==== Gharbiya ====
- First District of Gharbiya (10 members)
- Second District of Gharbiya (10 members)

==== Monoufiya ====
- First District of Monoufiya (8 members)
- Second District of Monoufiya (8 members)

==== Beheira ====
- First District of Beheira (12 members)
- Second District of Beheira (8 members)

==== Giza ====
- First District of Giza (10 members)
- Second District of Giza (10 members)

==== Faiyoum ====
- First District of Faiyoum (8 members)
- Second District of Faiyoum (4 members)

==== Beni Sweif ====
- First District of Beni Sweif (8 members)
- Second District of Beni Sweif (4 members)

==== Minya ====
- First District of Minya (8 members)
- Second District of Minya (8 members)

==== Assiut ====
- First District of Assiut (8 members)
- Second District of Assiut (8 members)

==== Sohag ====
- First District of Sohag (12 members)
- Second District of Sohag (8 members)

==== Qena ====
- First District of Qena (4 members)
- Second District of Qena (8 members)

==== Luxor ====
- Luxor (4 members)

==== Aswan ====
- Aswan (4 members)

==== Matrouh ====
- Matrouh (4 members)

==== New Valley ====
- New Valley (4 members)

==== Red Sea ====
- Red Sea (4 members)

==== South Sinai ====
- South Sinai (4 members)

=== Single-member constituencies (two members each) ===
==== Cairo ====
- First District of Cairo
- Second District of Cairo
- Third District of Cairo
- Fourth District of Cairo
- Fifth District of Cairo
- Sixth District of Cairo
- Seventh District of Cairo
- Eighth District of Cairo
