= List of speakers of the House of Representatives (Egypt) =

The Speaker of the House of Representatives of Egypt is the presiding officer of that body. The House of Representatives is the lower house of the Parliament of Egypt.

== List of officeholders ==
No.	Portrait	Name	Term of office			Political party
No.	Portrait	Name	Took office	Left office	Time in office	Political party
National Assembly
1		Abdel Latif Boghdadi	22 July 1957	4 July 1958 (resigned)	347 days	Military / Liberation Rally
Vacant (4 July 1958 – 21 July 1960)
2		Anwar Sadat	21 July 1960	20 January 1969	8 years, 182 days	National Union (until December 1962)
		Anwar Sadat	21 July 1960	20 January 1969	8 years, 182 days	Arab Socialist Union
3		Dr. Mohamed Labib Shokeir	20 January 1969	14 May 1971	2 years, 115 days	Arab Socialist Union
People's Assembly of Egypt
4		Hafez Badawi	14 May 1971	22 October 1974	3 years, 160 days	Arab Socialist Union
5		Sayed Marei	22 October 1974	3 November 1978	4 years, 12 days	Arab Socialist Union (until 2 October 1978)
		Sayed Marei	22 October 1974	3 November 1978	4 years, 12 days	National Democratic Party
6		Sufi Abu Taleb	3 November 1978	4 November 1983	5 years, 1 day	National Democratic Party
7		Mohamed Kamel Leilah	4 November 1983	22 June 1984	231 days	National Democratic Party
8		Rifaat el-Mahgoub	22 June 1984	12 October 1990 (assassinated)	6 years, 111 days	National Democratic Party
Vacant (12 October 1990 – 13 December 1990)
9		Ahmad Fathi Sorour	13 December 1990	13 February 2011 (deposed)	20 years, 60 days	National Democratic Party
Vacant (13 February 2011 – 23 January 2012)
10		Saad El-Katatni	23 January 2012	22 September 2012 (dissolved)	243 days	Freedom and Justice Party
Vacant (22 September 2012 – 10 January 2016)
House of Representatives
11		Ali Abdel Aal	10 January 2016	12 January 2021	5 years	For the Love of Egypt
12		Hanafy El Gebaly	12 January 2021	12 January 2026	5 years, 71 days	Nation's Future Party
13		Hisham Badawy	12 January 2026		71 days	

== Sources ==
- Official website of the People's Assembly of Egypt
