= Egypt Supra-Constitutional Principles Document =

In the context of the 2011 Egyptian revolution, an initiative was launched by the Government of Egypt during mid-2011 to draft what has been referred to as the "supra-constitutional principles". A draft published on 1 November 2011 sought to grant the Supreme Council of the Armed Forces military autonomy from any oversight and a permanent power to intervene in politics. It also gave the military and/or judiciary broad powers over the upcoming processes of establishing a new parliament and passing a new constitution. In order to partly satisfy secular activists who had been demanding a new (non-Islamic) constitution before parliamentary elections, the principles included guarantees for fundamental citizenship rights. The principles became known as the El-Selmi document. It gave rise to renewed large scale protests and street fighting against the government in November 2011.
