= Speaker of the House of Representatives (Egypt) =

Egyptian parliamentary office

- Seal of the House of Representatives

- Flag of Egypt
- Incumbent; Hisham Badawy since 12 January 2026
- Style: His Excellency; Mr. Speaker
- Nominator: House of Representatives
- Appointer: House members
- Term length: 5 years
- Inaugural holder: Abdel Latif Boghdadi
- Formation: 22 July 1957
- Website: EPA

The speaker of the House of Representatives (Arabic: رئيس مجلس النواب) presides over the sessions of the House of Representatives of Egypt with functions similar to that of a speaker in other countries. In case of the vacancy of the presidential office or the permanent incapacitation of the president, the speaker of the People's Assembly shall temporarily assume the presidency for a maximum period of 60 days.

Following the 2011 Egyptian revolution and the ouster of President Hosni Mubarak and arrest of Speaker of the Assembly Ahmad Fathi Sorour, one of the leaders of the National Democratic Party, Parliament was temporarily dissolved. Following the 2011–12 Egyptian parliamentary election, Dr. Mohamed Saad El-Katatny was elected as speaker by 399 out of 503 of his fellow members of parliament on the opening session of the new parliament on 23 January 2012, almost a year after the outbreak of the revolution. However, the Supreme Constitutional Court invalidated the elections of the House of Representatives, claiming that members of the Muslim Brotherhood ran as independents and that their elections were not valid, thus ordering the lower house to be dissolved.

== Powers ==
The speaker of the House of Representatives puts the plan of activities of the assembly and its committees with his two deputies, and he represents the assembly in the international conferences.

== Deputy speakers ==
The speaker of the House of Representatives has several deputies, the Deputy Speakers of the House, who are supplied by the other parliamentary groups. The number of deputy speakers is two.

- Assem el Gazzar (since 12 January 2026)
- Mohamed Elwahsh (since 12 January 2026)

== See also ==
- List of speakers of the House of Representatives (Egypt)
