= Supreme Constitutional Court (Egypt) =

Highest judiciary body in Egypt

- المحكمة الدستورية العليا
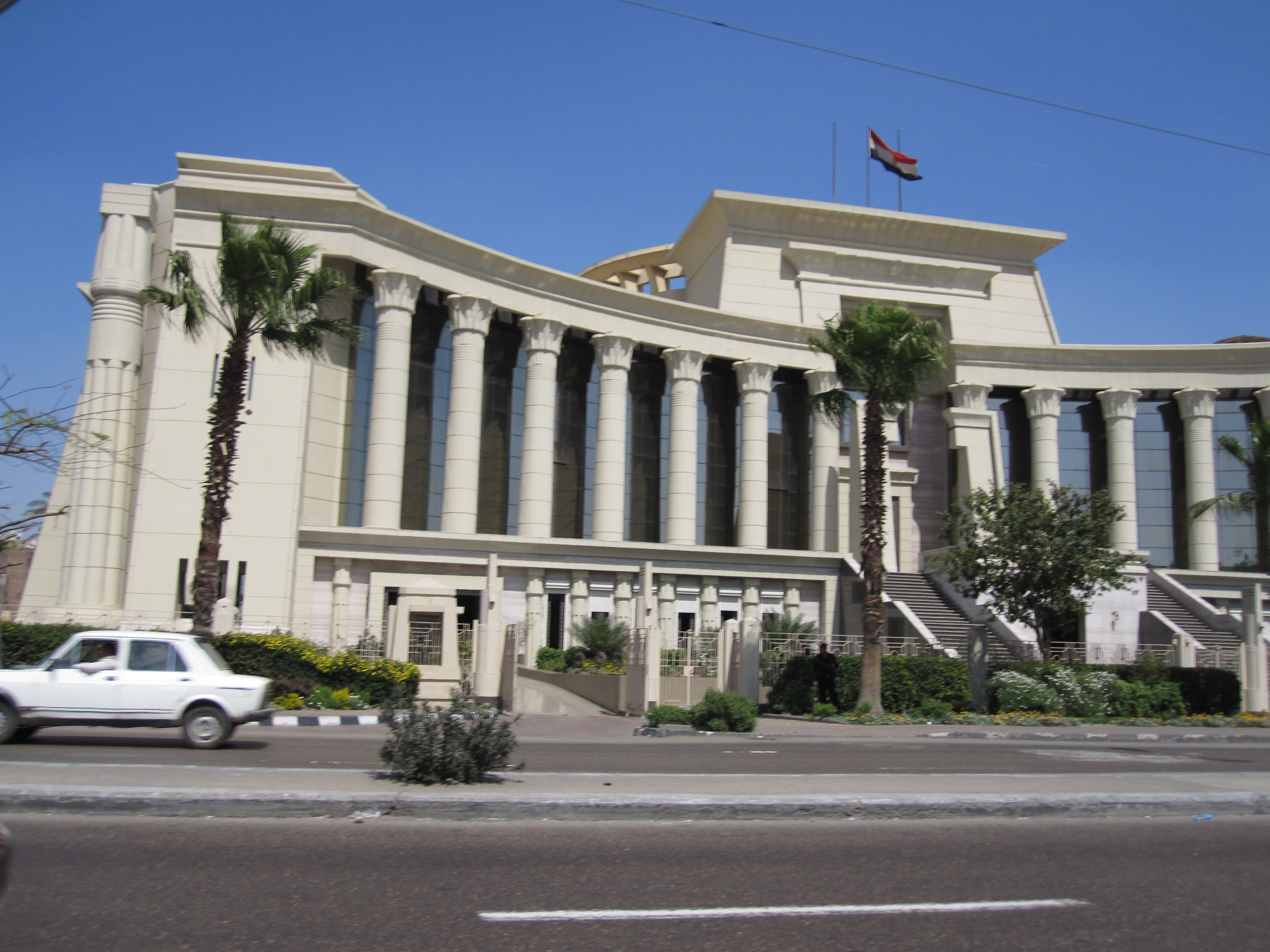
- Interactive map of Supreme Constitutional Court
- 29°58′8″N 31°14′23″E
- Established: 1979
- Jurisdiction: Egypt
- Location: Cairo
- Coordinates: 29°58′8″N 31°14′23″E
- Authorised by: 1971 Constitution; Law No. 48/1979
- Number of positions: 21

President
- Currently: Boulos Fahmy
- Since: 9 February 2022

The Supreme Constitutional Court (Arabic: المحكمة الدستورية العليا, Al Mahkama Al Dustūrīya El ‘Ulyā) is an independent judicial body in Egypt, located in the Cairo suburb of Maadi.

The Supreme Constitutional Court is the highest judicial authority in the Arab Republic of Egypt, with its headquarters located in Cairo. Its primary function is to ensure that laws are in compliance with the provisions of the Egyptian Constitution. The court has the power to annul any laws that are found to violate constitutional texts and articles.

Operating as an independent judicial body, the Supreme Constitutional Court is separate from both the legislative and executive branches of government. The court is composed of a president, one or more vice presidents, and a sufficient number of counselors. Rulings are issued by a panel of seven counselors, and such rulings are final and cannot be contested by any means.

In addition to its role in reviewing laws, the Supreme Constitutional Court also determines the appropriate jurisdiction in cases of conflict between governmental authorities. Several conditions must be met for the court to establish competent jurisdiction: the dispute must arise between two judicial bodies or entities with judicial authority; it must originate from two judgments that definitively resolve the issue; the judgments must be contradictory to the extent that simultaneous enforcement is impossible; and the conflicting judgments must be issued by two functionally independent courts.

== Specialization ==
The permanent Egyptian Constitution, issued in 1971, contains specific provisions regarding the Supreme Constitutional Court within Articles 174 to 178. This is followed by a statement of subsequent amendments and the texts of the Supreme Constitutional Court Law, enacted by Law No. 48 of 1979, which outlines its competencies. These competencies are as follows:

1. Monitoring the constitutionality of laws and regulations.
2. Interpreting legislative texts that raise controversy in application.
3. Adjudicating conflicts of jurisdiction between judicial bodies or bodies with jurisdiction.
4. Adjudicating a dispute over the execution of two conflicting final judgments.
5. Interpreting the texts of laws issued by the legislative authority and decrees issued by the President of the Republic in accordance with the provisions of the Constitution, if they raise a dispute in application and are of such importance that their interpretation must be standardized.

The Supreme Constitutional Court is empowered to declare the unconstitutionality of any text in a law or regulation that it encounters in the course of its functions, provided that the text is relevant to the dispute before it. This declaration follows the prescribed procedures for preparing constitutional cases.

The law specifies the methods for submitting cases to the court in various forms, as well as the procedures for the preparation and examination of these cases until a ruling is issued.

Additionally, the Supreme Constitutional Court participates in international activities. It is a member of the Association of Supreme Constitutional Courts and Councils, holds observer status in the Association of European Constitutional Courts, and serves as an observer member in the Association of Constitutional Courts of Latin American countries.

== Litigation procedures ==
The Supreme Constitutional Court is empowered to declare the unconstitutionality of any text in a law or regulation that it encounters in the course of its functions, provided that the text is relevant to the dispute before it. This declaration follows the prescribed procedures for preparing constitutional cases.

The law specifies the methods for submitting cases to the court in various forms, as well as the procedures for the preparation and examination of these cases until a ruling is issued.

Additionally, the Supreme Constitutional Court participates in international activities. It is a member of the Association of Supreme Constitutional Courts and Councils, holds observer status in the Association of European Constitutional Courts, and serves as an observer member in the Association of Constitutional Courts of Latin American countries.

1. Referral method: If a court or judicial body, during the course of hearing a case, finds that a provision in a law or regulation necessary for resolving the dispute may be unconstitutional, it is required to suspend the case and refer the matter, without any fees, to the Supreme Constitutional Court for a ruling on the constitutional issue.
2. Payment method: If, during the hearing of a case, one of the parties challenges the constitutionality of a legal provision, and the court or judicial body deems the challenge to be serious, the case must be postponed. The court is required to set a deadline, not exceeding three months, for the party raising the challenge to file a case before the Supreme Constitutional Court. If the case is not filed within the specified period, the challenge is deemed null and void.

The referral decision to the Supreme Constitutional Court, or the petition submitted to it, must include a statement identifying the legislative provision being challenged for unconstitutionality, the constitutional provision allegedly violated, and the grounds for the alleged violation.

Any interested party may request the Supreme Constitutional Court to designate the competent judicial body to hear the case. The request must detail the subject of the dispute, the judicial bodies that have previously examined the matter, and the actions taken by each body. The submission of such a request automatically suspends all related ongoing cases until the Court issues its ruling.

Additionally, any interested party may petition the Supreme Constitutional Court to resolve a conflict arising from the enforcement of two contradictory final judgments. The request must describe the enforcement dispute and explain the nature of the contradiction between the two rulings. Upon request, the President of the Court may order the suspension of one or both judgments until the conflict is resolved.

A request for legal interpretation may be submitted to the Court by the Minister of Justice at the request of the Prime Minister, the Speaker of the People's Assembly, or the Supreme Judicial Council. The request must outline the legislative provision in question, the disagreement over its application, and the importance of ensuring uniform interpretation to promote consistency in its enforcement.

Only lawyers admitted to practice before the Court of Cassation and the Supreme Administrative Court are permitted to appear before the Supreme Constitutional Court. The government must be represented by a member of the State Lawsuit Authority, holding at least the rank of Counselor.

The Supreme Constitutional Court generally rules on cases and petitions without oral argument. However, if the Court deems oral argument necessary, it may hear the arguments of the lawyers representing the parties and the representative of the Commissioner's Authority. In such cases, parties are not permitted to appear before the Court without legal representation. Additionally, parties that have not submitted memoranda as required under Article 37 are not entitled to have a lawyer represent them during the session.

The Court may grant permission for the parties' lawyers and the Commissioner's Authority to submit supplementary memorandum, within deadlines it establishes. The procedural rules concerning the presence or absence of parties, as outlined in the Code of Civil and Commercial Procedures, do not apply to cases and petitions before the Supreme Constitutional Court.

== The types of its provisions ==
- The court's judgments and decisions are issued in the name of the people.
- The court shall, on its own initiative, rule on all incidental matters.
- The court's rulings and decisions are final and not subject to appeal.
- The rulings of the Supreme Constitutional Court in constitutional cases, as well as its decisions on interpretations, are binding on all state authorities and individuals. Judgments and decisions must be published in the Official Gazette free of charge within fifteen days from the date of issuance. A ruling that declares a provision in a law or regulation unconstitutional results in its inapplicability starting the day after the publication of the judgment, unless the Court specifies a different date. However, a judgment declaring a tax provision unconstitutional has direct effect in all cases, preserving the plaintiff's right to benefit from the ruling. If the ruling of unconstitutionality concerns a criminal provision, all convictions based on that provision are rendered null and void. The President of the Commissioner's Authority is responsible for promptly notifying the Public Prosecutor of the ruling upon its announcement to facilitate necessary actions.
- The Supreme Constitutional Court has exclusive jurisdiction over all disputes concerning the enforcement of its judgments and decisions. The provisions outlined in the Civil and Commercial Procedure Code apply to these disputes, provided they do not conflict with the nature of the Court's jurisdiction or the specific conditions established before it. The filing of a dispute does not automatically result in the suspension of execution unless ordered by the Court until the resolution of the dispute.
- The provisions outlined in the Code of Civil and Commercial Procedures apply to the rulings and decisions issued by the Supreme Constitutional Court in matters not specifically addressed by its governing laws, provided that they do not conflict with the nature of those rulings and decisions.

== Financial affairs ==
A fixed fee of twenty-five Egyptian pounds is imposed on constitutional cases, covering all judicial procedures related to the case, including the notification of documents and judgments. The plaintiff is required to deposit a guarantee of twenty-five pounds in the court treasury upon submitting the petition. In cases with multiple plaintiffs filing a joint petition, only one guarantee is necessary. The court will confiscate the guarantee if it issues a ruling declaring the case inadmissible or dismissing it. The court clerk will not accept the petition if it is not accompanied by proof of this deposit.

The provisions regarding fees and expenses in matters not specifically addressed by this law are governed by Law No. 90 of 1944 concerning judicial fees in civil matters and the Code of Civil and Commercial Procedures. The Supreme Constitutional Court maintains an independent annual budget, which is prepared similarly to the general state budget, commencing at the beginning of its fiscal year and concluding at its end.

The President of the Court is responsible for preparing the budget proposal, which must be submitted to the competent authority after being reviewed and approved by the Court's General Assembly. The General Assembly exercises the powers granted to the Minister of Finance under relevant laws and regulations regarding the Court's budget. Meanwhile, the President of the Court exercises the powers typically granted to the Minister of Administrative Development and the head of the Central Agency for Organization and Administration. The provisions of the Public Budget Law apply to the Court's budget and final accounts in matters not specifically addressed by this law.

== History ==
Demands for judicial oversight of the constitutionality of laws in Egypt emerged at both doctrinal and judicial levels long before legislative measures were enacted to address this issue. Legal scholars advocated for the right of courts to review the constitutionality of applicable laws and to refrain from enforcing such laws in disputes brought before them, without directly challenging or declaring these laws void.

The first formal articulation of this perspective occurred in a lecture delivered in 1920, titled "The Role of the Judiciary in Constitutional Matters in the United States and Egypt." This viewpoint sparked extensive legal debate, leading many legal scholars to acknowledge the right of the Egyptian judiciary to oversee the constitutionality of laws. This recognition was grounded in the principle of the legality of laws, the assertion that upholding the law falls within the purview of judges, and the necessity for a judicial body to ensure the legality of laws in light of the principle of separation of powers. However, a minority of legal scholars opposed granting this authority to the courts.

=== The first stage: 1924 ===
The issue of the constitutionality of laws first emerged in the judicial arena in 1924 before the Alexandria Criminal Court. This occurred while the court was considering an appeal submitted by the defense on behalf of a group of citizens who had been charged by the Public Prosecution with disseminating revolutionary ideas aimed at changing the political and social landscape in Egypt between 1923 and 1924 in Alexandria and other cities.

The court rendered a judgment convicting the defendants in absentia, sentencing them to three years in prison based on Article 151 of the Penal Code. The defendants' legal team appealed this ruling, arguing that the aforementioned article violated Article 14 of the Constitution.

=== Second Stage: 1925 ===
In 1925, an amendment to the election law was enacted during a period of parliamentary dissolution. This led to resistance from some mayors and local leaders, who refused to accept the election registers and subsequently went on strike. In response, the Public Prosecution ordered their immediate arrest and prosecution for failing to comply with government directives issued by their legal superiors.

The defense counsel for the defendants argued that the amended election law was unconstitutional, as it had been enacted in the absence of Parliament. They contended that the refusal to act on an unlawful law should not result in punishment. In 1926, the court ruled in the defendants' presence, imposing a fine of ten Egyptian pounds on each of them for violating the official orders issued to them.

=== Third stage: 1941 ===
In 1941, the Egyptian Civil Court issued a landmark ruling affirming the authority of courts to oversee the constitutionality of laws. This ruling established the existence of two types of laws within the legal framework of Egypt: ordinary laws, which govern proceedings in Egyptian courts and are utilized by judges to resolve disputes, and the Constitution, which serves as the highest law in the country.

Judges are mandated to respect both categories of law when adjudicating any case. However, if a provision of ordinary law conflicts with a provision of the Constitution, the judge is required to prioritize the constitutional provision, reflecting the supremacy of the Constitution.

=== Fourth stage: 1948 ===
As a result of the efforts of legal scholars in Egypt to establish judicial oversight of the conformity of laws with the Constitution, the Administrative Court issued a pivotal ruling in 1948 that marked as turning point for the Egyptian judiciary's authority over the constitutionality of laws. This ruling clarified the judiciary's right to confront unconstitutional laws.

The court based its decision on the premise that Egyptian law does not formally or substantively prevent Egyptian courts from exercising the necessary oversight responsibilities. Such oversight is viewed as an essential application of the principle of separation of powers. Additionally, the court relied on the discretionary authority granted to Egyptian courts in addressing the cases before them, which enables the court to disregard any ordinary law that contradicts a provision of the Constitution.

=== Fifth stage: 1953 ===
The judicial landscape in Egypt remained largely unchanged following the ruling of the Administrative Court until the July Revolution of 1952. This revolution prompted the drafting of a new constitution to replace the 1923 Constitution, known as the "Fifty Committee Project." This project proposed the establishment of a Supreme Court with the authority to oversee the constitutionality of laws, representing the first practical attempt to create such a court in Egypt for legislative oversight.

The project stipulated that the Supreme Court would consist of no more than nine judges, selected from among law professors at Egyptian law schools, advisors from other courts, and legal practitioners before the Egyptian Court of Cassation. Although the Fifty Committee Project began to take tangible steps toward implementation, it was ultimately thwarted by the revolution's leaders, who disregarded it and prepared an alternative draft for the new constitution.

=== Sixth stage: 1969 ===
In 1969, President Gamal Abdel Nasser of the United Arab Republic issued Law No. 81, establishing the Supreme Court, which was officially inaugurated in 1970. This court was tasked with the responsibility of overseeing the constitutionality of laws. Many legal scholars consider this decision a remedy for the shortcomings of the Fifty Committee Project. The Supreme Court continued to fulfill its constitutional duties until the establishment of the Supreme Constitutional Court in 1979.

=== Seventh stage: 1971 ===
The designation "Supreme Constitutional Court" was established with the promulgation of the 1971 Constitution, which created the court responsible for overseeing the constitutionality of laws and defined it as an independent judicial authority.

Following this, Law No. 48 of 1979 was enacted to regulate the operations, structure, and jurisdiction of the Supreme Constitutional Court, ensuring its independence from the executive.

=== The eighth stage: 2012 ===
Following the January 25 Revolution in 2011 and the subsequent presidential elections in 2012, a significant dialogue and debate took place over a six-month period regarding a draft for a new constitution for Egypt, titled the "Draft Constitution of Egypt 2012." This culminated in a public referendum held in two phases on December 15 and 22, 2012. The new constitution was ultimately approved on December 25, 2012, with approximately 64% of voters in favor and 36% against.

Under the new constitution, the Supreme Constitutional Court continues to function as an independent judicial body based in Cairo, with exclusive jurisdiction to adjudicate the constitutionality of laws and regulations. The law outlines its additional powers and the procedures to be followed.

The constitution specifies that the court shall be composed of a president and ten members, detailing that legislation will define the judicial or other bodies responsible for their nomination, the appointment process, and the required qualifications. Final appointments are made through a decision issued by the President of the Republic.

Furthermore, Article 177 of the 2012 Constitution grants the Supreme Constitutional Court the authority to determine the conformity of draft laws governing political rights and legislative and local elections with the Constitution prior to their enactment. Laws in this context are exempt from the subsequent oversight described in previous articles.

== Court building ==
The Supreme Constitutional Court is situated on the Nile Corniche in Maadi, Greater Cairo, and covers an area of 4,000 square meters. The building comprises four floors, which include courtrooms, conference halls, the office of the court's president, 33 offices for advisors, and a legal library containing numerous legal texts and references. The building was designed by architect Ahmed Mito, where it combines elements of ancient Egyptian architecture with contemporary design, symbolizing a modern interpretation of traditional styles.

The building is inspired by the Temple of Luxor, featuring 14 Pharaonic obelisks on the ground floor and an additional 14 obelisks extending from the first to the fourth floor. This design mirrors the layout of ancient Egyptian temples, characterized by columns and capitals adorned with lotus and papyrus motifs. The columns reach a height of 28 meters, and there is a fountain designed in the shape of a lotus flower.

Additionally, the court incorporates glass panels that complement the ancient Pharaonic aesthetic of the building.

The establishment of this historical edifice is attributed to former Chief Justice Dr. Awad El-Mer, who served from 1991 to 1998. The main conference hall within the court is named in his honor.

=== Constitutional impasse in 2008 due to geographic location ===
On April 18, 2008, a reorganization of divisions within the Greater Cairo Governorate resulted in the establishment of two new governorates: Helwan and October 6. Following the issuance of the decision to create Helwan Governorate, the Supreme Constitutional Court determined that its location on the Nile Corniche, within the Al-Basateen district, had become geographically associated with Helwan rather than the capital, Cairo. This situation raised constitutional concerns, as the 1971 Constitution mandates that the court must be located in the capital. This provision is specified in Chapter Five of the Fifth Title of the 1971 Constitution under the heading "Supreme Constitutional Court," particularly in Article 174.

To resolve this issue, former President Mohamed Hosni Mubarak intervened to address the constitutional impasse on April 21, 2008. He stated that the Constitution mandates the Supreme Constitutional Court to be located in the capital and issued a decree to administratively reassign the court to Cairo Governorate.

Following the January 25 Revolution, the transitional government led by Dr. Essam Sharaf annulled the governorates of Helwan and October 6 as part of a reshuffling of governors initiated by the Supreme Council of the Armed Forces, which was responsible for managing the country's affairs at that time. Consequently, October 6 returned to its affiliation with Giza Governorate, while Helwan reverted to Cairo Governorate, as both were seen as desert extensions complementing the urban and agricultural expansion plans of Cairo and Giza.

== Recruitment ==
To be appointed as a counselor in the Supreme Constitutional Court, an individual must meet the general qualifications required for holding judicial positions as stipulated by the Judicial Authority Law. Additionally, the candidate must be at least 43 years of age. Appointments are made from among the following categories:

1. Current counselors or those of equivalent rank from various judicial bodies who have served in the position of counselor or an equivalent role for at least three years.
2. Those who have previously held the position of counselor or equivalent in judicial bodies for at least three years.
3. Those who have been teaching law at universities in the Arab Republic of Egypt in the position of professor for at least eight years.
4. Lawyers who have practiced before the Court of Cassation or the Supreme Administrative Court for at least eight years.

The President of the Supreme Constitutional Court is appointed by the President of the Republic, who selects from among the members of the Supreme Court or other candidates who meet the specified appointment criteria. Notably, the appointment of the President of the Court is not subject to retirement age limitations.

The Vice Presidents and counselors of the Court are appointed by a decision from the President of the Republic following consultation with the Supreme Judicial Council. The appointment decision specifies the position and seniority of each appointee. Terms for the President, Vice Presidents, and counselors last for three years and are renewable.

Before assuming their duties, all members of the Supreme Constitutional Court take an oath to adjudicate fairly and uphold the law. The President of the Court takes the oath before the President of the Republic, while the Vice Presidents and counselors take their oaths before the President of the Supreme Constitutional Court.

== Roles ==
- Members of the Supreme Constitutional Court cannot be dismissed from their positions. However, if a member is deemed to have lost trust and respect or commits a serious breach of duty, they may be referred to retirement by a decision from the President of the Republic, based on an investigation conducted by the Court. From the date of the Court's decision to refer a member for investigation, that member is considered to be on mandatory leave until a resolution is reached.
- The provisions regarding the retirement of Court of Cassation advisors apply to members of the Constitutional Court.
- Members of the Supreme Constitutional Court may not be seconded or loaned to other positions, except for legal work with international organizations or foreign countries, or for scientific missions.
- Sessions of the Supreme Constitutional Court are generally public unless the Court orders them to be held in camera for reasons of decency, public order, or other circumstances specified by law. In all cases, the verdict must be pronounced in a public session. The rules governing proceedings before the Court of Cassation also apply to the judgments issued by the Supreme Constitutional Court and the order of hearings.
- The rulings and decisions of the Supreme Court are final and cannot be appealed by any means of appeal.
- Lawyers admitted to the Supreme Court are admitted to the Court of Cassation or the Supreme Administrative Court.
- The Supreme Constitutional Court is assisted by a Chief Clerk, a Deputy Clerk, and a sufficient number of section heads, clerks, translators, and other personnel. Employees of the court are subject to the general provisions governing civil servants in the state. The President of the Supreme Constitutional Court holds authority equivalent to that of a minister and a deputy minister concerning these staff members, as outlined in relevant laws and regulations.
- The court shall establish a Personnel Affairs Committee composed of three counselors selected by the President of the court, in addition to the Chief Clerk and the Deputy Clerk.
- The same provisions concerning unfitness, recusal, and disqualification applicable to the justices of the Court of Cassation also extend to the members of the Egyptian Supreme Constitutional Court. The Supreme Constitutional Court adjudicates requests for recusal and claims of disqualification with the participation of all its members, excluding the member in question and any member who has a legitimate excuse. A request to recuse or disqualify all or some members of the Court will not be accepted if the remaining number of members falls below seven.

== General Assembly of the Court ==
The General Assembly of the Supreme Constitutional Court makes decisions by an absolute majority of the votes of those present. In the event of a tie, the side supported by the President prevails, except when the vote is conducted in secret, in which case the proposal is considered rejected. The proceedings of the General Assembly are documented in minutes recorded in a register, which is signed by the President of the Assembly and the Secretary-General of the Court.

Additionally, the General Assembly forms a Provisional Affairs Committee, chaired by the President of the Court and composed of two or more members. This committee is responsible for handling urgent matters during the Court’s judicial recess, acting in place of the General Assembly.

== Panel of Commissioners to the Court ==
The body functions as an internal entity within the Supreme Constitutional Court, composed of the President of the Court and a sufficient number of senior and assistant judges. In the absence of the President, the most senior member assumes the President's duties. The President of the body is tasked with organizing its work and supervising its activities.

Before assuming their duties, the President and members of the Commissioners' Authority must take the following oath before the General Assembly of the Supreme Constitutional Court:

"I swear by Almighty God to uphold justice, respect the law, and perform my duties with honor and integrity."

The President and members of the Commissioners' Authority are irremovable and cannot be transferred to other positions without their consent. The same provisions concerning guarantees, rights, duties, retirement, leaves, promotions, salaries, bonuses, pensions, and entitlements that apply to members of the Supreme Constitutional Court also apply to them and their beneficiaries.

== Court statistics ==
Aggregate statistics on cases decided from the establishment of the court until April 30, 2008.

Judicial year	Total cases	Constitutional issues	Conflict issues	Interpretation issues
First 1979	62	31	26	4
Second 1980	52	41	6	5
Third 1981	87	82	2	2
Fourth 1982	170	150	15	3
Fifth 1983	160	150	6	2
Sixth 1984	149	136	7	1
Seventh 1985	60	47	6	1
Eighth 1986	49	28	15	3
Ninth 1987	62	38	20	0
Tenth 1988	47	39	4	0
Eleventh 1989	56	40	12	0
Twelfth 1990	122	104	9	0
Thirteenth 1991	80	65	9	1
Fourteenth 1992	44	26	9	0
Fifteenth 1993	52	37	11	1
Sixteenth 1994	62	39	17	0
Seventeenth 1995	115	83	24	2
Eighteenth 1996	171	131	13	0
Nineteenth 1997	242	181	10	0
Twentieth 1998	254	159	13	0
Twenty-first 1999	292	174	34	0
Twenty-second 2000	224	128	17	0
Twenty-third 2001	428	280	17	0
Twenty-fourth 2002	369	165	16	1
Twenty-fifth 2003	331	113	10	0
Twenty-sixth 2004	275	22	8	0
Twenty-seventh 2005	323	11	1	0
Twenty-eighth 2006	83	67	14	0
Twenty-ninth 2007	222	169	50	0
Thirtieth 2008	332	271	57	0
General total	4975	3007	458	26

== See also ==
- Constitution
- Constitutionalism
- Constitutional economics
- Jurisprudence
- Judiciary
- Rule of law
- Rule According to Higher Law
- Tahani al-Gebali
