= Second Ganzouri Cabinet =

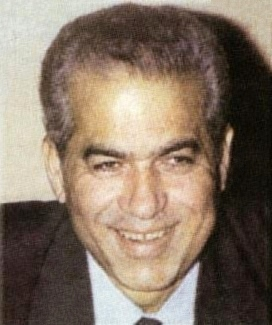
- Date formed: 7 December 2011
- Date dissolved: 26 June 2012

People and organisations
- Head of state: Muhammad Tantawi
- Head of government: Kamal Ganzouri
- Total no. of members: 28

History
- Predecessor: Sharaf Cabinet
- Successor: Qandil Cabinet

The Second Ganzouri Cabinet was led by Egyptian prime minister Kamal Ganzouri from 7 December 2011 to 26 June 2012. 28 ministers were sworn into Ganzouri's cabinet. The Cabinet headquarters in Cairo were the site of protests in mid-December 2011.

== List of ministers ==
Ministry	Minister	Start of office	Appointed by
Prime Minister	Kamal el-Ganzuri	7 December 2011	Army
Minister of Agriculture	Saad Nasar	7 December 2011	Army
Minister of Military Production	Ali Ibrahim Sabry	21 July 2011	Army
Minister of Foreign Affairs	Mohamed Kamel Amr	18 July 2011	Army
Minister of Interior	Mohamed Ibrahim	7 December 2011	Army
Minister of Information	Ahmed Anis	7 December 2011	Army
Minister of Higher Education	Hassan Mustafa Khaled	7 December 2011	Army
Minister of Scientific Research	Nadia Zakhary	7 December 2011	Army
Minister of Justice	Adel Abdel Hamid	7 December 2011	Army
Minister of Culture	Shaker Abdel Hamid	7 December 2011	Army
Minister of Tourism	Mounir Fakhry Abdel Nour	February 2011	Army
Minister of Housing and New Urban Communities	Mohamed Fathi ElBaradei	31 January 2011	Hosni Mubarak
Minister of Health	Foad ElNawawy	7 December 2011	Army
Minister of Water and Irrigation	Hisham Kandeel	21 July 2011	Army
Minister of Environment	Mostafa Hussein Kamel	7 December 2011	Army
Minister of Education	Gamal El-Araby	7 December 2011	Army
Minister of Industry and Foreign Trade	Mahmoud Eissa	21 July 2011	Army
Minister of Finance	Momtaz Said	7 December 2011	Army
Minister of Electricity	Hassan Younes	22 November 2001	Hosni Mubarak
Minister of Petroleum and Mineral Resources	Mohamed Abdullah Ghorab	21 March 2011	Army
Minister of International Cooperation	Faiza Abu Naga	13 July 2004	Hosni Mubarak
Minister of Social Affairs and Insurance	Nagwa Hassan Khalil	7 December 2011	Army
Minister of Traffic, Communication and Civil Aviation	Hassan Massoud	7 December 2011	Army
Minister of Food Supply and International Commerce	Gouda Abdel Khalek		
Minister of Investment and Businesses Sector	Ashraf El-Sharqawy	7 December 2011	Army
Minister of Labor Force	Fathi Fekri	7 December 2011	Army
Minister of Antiquities	Mohamed Ibrahim Ali Sayed	7 December 2011	Army
Minister of Religious Endowments	Mohamed El-Quosy	7 December 2011	Army
