= Qandil Cabinet =

Government of Egypt from 2012 to 2013

Hesham Qandil Cabinet
- Cabinet of Egypt

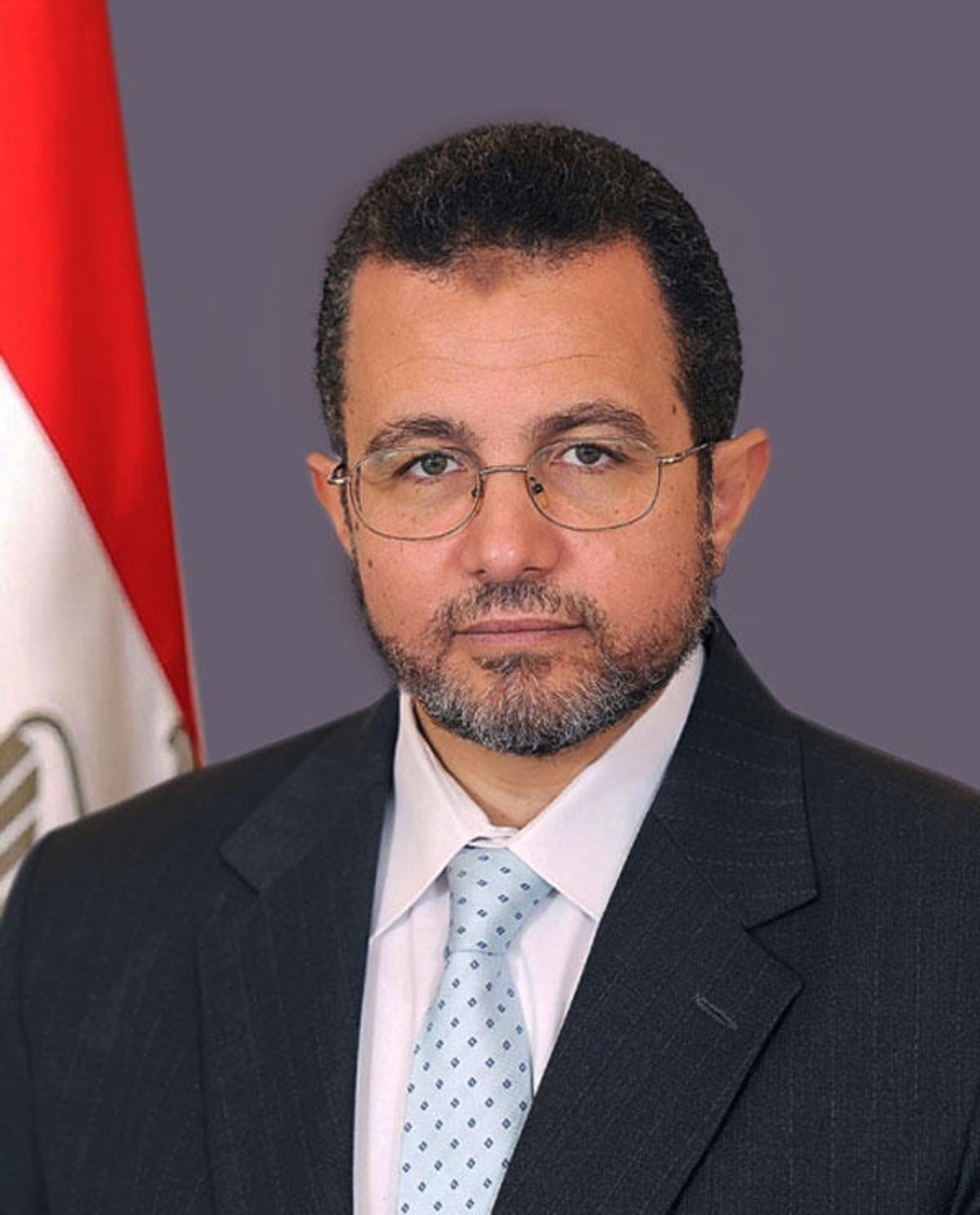
- Date formed: 2 August 2012
- Date dissolved: 8 July 2013

People and organisations
- President: Mohamed Morsi
- Prime Minister: Hesham Qandil
- Member party: Independent; Supported by: Freedom and Justice Party; Al-Wasat Party; Renaissance Party
- Status in legislature: Technocrats supported by FJP majority coalition

History
- Election: 2011–12 Egyptian parliamentary election
- Predecessor: Ganzouri II
- Successor: Beblawi Cabinet

The cabinet of Egyptian Prime Minister Hesham Qandil was sworn in on 2 August 2012. Qandil was appointed by President Mohamed Morsi, following the resignation of military-named premier Kamal Ganzouri. The cabinet consists of 36 ministers. The composition of the government is mostly formed by technocrats, with five Freedom and Justice Party (FJP) members and one member each from the Al-Wasat and Renaissance parties.

== Reshuffles ==
On 12 August 2012, President Mohamed Morsi appointed Abdel Fattah el-Sisi as defense minister and Reda Hafez as military production minister.

On 17 November 2012, transport minister Mohammad Rashad Al Matini resigned over the Manfalut railway accident.

On 5 January 2013, a cabinet reshuffle took place replacing ten ministers. The number of FJP members in the cabinet increased from five to eight after the reshuffle.

On 7 May 2013, another reshuffle took place replacing nine ministers, increasing the number of FJP members to 10 out of a total of 36.

== Resignations ==
On 1 July 2013, five cabinet members resigned together; they were tourism minister Hisham Zazou, communications and IT minister Atef Helmi, legal and parliamentary affairs minister Hatem Bagato, environment minister Khaled Abdel-Aal, and drinking water and sanitation facilities minister Abdel Khalifa. On 2 July 2013, foreign minister Mohamed Kamel Amr, petroleum minister Sherif Hadarra, and sports minister El Amry Farouk resigned. On 4 July 2013, one day after the 2013 Egyptian coup d'état, the Freedom and Justice Party announced nine ministers offered their resignations. The cabinet was dissolved on 8 July 2013 with the resignation of Prime Minister Hesham Qandil in protest over the killing of 61 protestors by the military at the Republican Guard headquarters.

== Composition ==
Portfolio	Minister	Took office	Left office	Party
Prime Minister	Hesham Qandil	2 August 2012	8 July 2013	Independent
Ministry of Interior	Ahmed Gamal El Din	2 August 2012	5 January 2013	Independent
Ministry of Interior	Mohamed Ibrahim Moustafa	5 January 2013	8 July 2013	Independent
Ministry of Defense	Muhammad Hussein Tantawy	2 August 2012	12 August 2012	Independent
Ministry of Defense	Abdel Fattah el-Sisi	12 August 2012	8 July 2013	Independent
Minister of Foreign Affairs	Mohamed Kamel Amr	2 August 2012	8 July 2013	Independent
Minister of Defense	Abdullah Ali Alewa	2 August 2012	8 July 2013	Independent
Minister of Military Production	Ali Sabry	2 August 2012	8 July 2013	Independent
Minister of Finance	Momtaz El-Saeed	2 August 2012	5 January 2013	Independent
Minister of Finance	Morsi El Sayed Hegazy	5 January 2013	7 May 2013	Independent
Minister of Finance	Fayyad Abdel Moneim	7 May 2013	8 July 2013	Independent
Minister of Insurance and Social Affairs	Nagwa Khalil	2 August 2012	8 July 2013	Independent
Minister of Scientific Research	Nadia Zakhary	2 August 2012	8 July 2013	Independent
Minister of Antiquities	Mohamed Ibrahim Al-Sayed	2 August 2012	7 May 2013	Independent
Minister of Antiquities	Ahmed Eissa	7 May 2013	8 July 2013	Independent
Minister of Environment	Mostafa Hussein Kamel	2 August 2012	5 January 2013	Independent
Minister of Environment	Khaled Abdel Aal	5 January 2013	8 July 2013	Independent
Minister of Local Development	Ahmed Abdeen	2 August 2012	5 January 2013	Independent
Minister of Local Development	Mohammed Ali Beshr	5 January 2013	8 July 2013	Freedom and Justice
Minister of Higher Education and Scientific Research	Abdul Wahab Raweh	2 August 2012	8 July 2013	Independent
Minister of Drinking Water and Sanitation Facilities	Abdel Qawi Khalifa	2 August 2012	8 July 2013	Independent
Minister of Culture	Mohamed Arab	2 August 2012	7 May 2013	Independent
Minister of Culture	Alaa Abdel-Aziz	7 May 2013	8 July 2013	Congress
Minister of Justice	Ahmed Mekki	2 August 2012	20 April 2013	Independent
Minister of Justice	Ahmed Sulaiman	20 April 2013	7 May 2013	Independent
Minister of Investment	Osama Saleh	2 August 2012	7 May 2013	Independent
Minister of Investment	Yehia Hamed Abdel-Samie	7 May 2013	8 July 2013	Freedom and Justice
Minister of Education	Ibrahim Ghoneim	2 August 2012	8 July 2013	Independent
Minister of Transportation	Mohammad Rashad Al Matini	2 August 2012	17 November 2012	Independent
Minister of Transportation	Hatem Abdel Latif	17 November 2012	8 July 2013	Freedom and Justice
Minister of Electricity and Energy	Mahmoud Balbaa	2 August 2012	5 January 2013	Independent
Minister of Electricity and Energy	Ahmed Emam	5 January 2013	8 July 2013	Independent
Minister of Legal and Parliamentary Affairs	Mohamed Mahsoub	2 August 2012	26 December 2012	Al-Wasat Party
Minister of Legal and Parliamentary Affairs	Omar Salem	26 December 2012	7 May 2013	Independent
Minister of Legal and Parliamentary Affairs	Hatem Bagato	7 May 2013	8 July 2013	Independent
Minister of Transport	Omar al-Amawdi	2 August 2012	8 July 2013	Independent
Minister of Tourism	Hisham Zazou	2 August 2012	8 July 2013	Independent
Minister of Agriculture and Land Reclamation	Salah Abdel Moamen	2 August 2012	7 May 2013	Independent
Minister of Agriculture and Land Reclamation	Ahmed Mahmoud Ali El-Gizawi	7 May 2013	8 July 2013	Independent
Minister of Communications and Information Technology	Hany Mahmoud	2 August 2012	5 January 2013	Independent
Minister of Communications and Information Technology	Atef Helmy	5 January 2013	8 July 2013	Independent
Ministry of Petroleum and Metallurgical Wealth	Osama Kamal	2 August 2012	7 May 2013	Independent
Ministry of Petroleum and Metallurgical Wealth	Sherif Hadarra	7 May 2013	8 July 2013	Independent
Minister of Telecommunications & Information Technology	Abdulmalik al-Mualami	2 August 2012	8 July 2013	Independent
Minister of Water Resources and Irrigation	Mohamed Bahaa Eldin	2 August 2012	8 July 2013	Independent
Minister of Housing and Urban Development	Tarek Wafik	2 August 2012	8 July 2013	Freedom and Justice
Minister of Higher Education	Mostafa Mussad	2 August 2012	8 July 2013	Freedom and Justice
Minister of Supply and Internal Trade	Mohamed Abou Zeid	2 August 2012	5 January 2013	Independent
Minister of Supply and Internal Trade	Bassem Ouda	5 January 2013	8 July 2013	Freedom and Justice
Minister of Manpower and Immigration	Khaled Azhari	2 August 2012	8 July 2013	Freedom and Justice
Minister of Religious Endowments	Talaat Afifi	2 August 2012	8 July 2013	Independent
Ministry of Planning and International Cooperation	Ashraf El-Araby	2 August 2012	7 May 2013	Independent
Ministry of Planning and International Cooperation	Amr Darrag	7 May 2013	8 July 2013	Freedom and Justice
Minister of Health and Population	Mohamed Hamed	2 August 2012	8 July 2013	Independent
Minister of Information	Salah Abdel Maqsoud	2 August 2012	8 July 2013	Freedom and Justice
Minister of Civil Aviation	Samir Imbabi	2 August 2012	5 January 2013	Independent
Minister of Civil Aviation	Wael El-Maadawy	5 January 2013	8 July 2013	Independent
Minister of Industry and Foreign Trade	Hatem Saleh	2 August 2012	8 July 2013	Renaissance Party (Egypt)
Minister of Youth Affairs	Osama Yassin	2 August 2012	8 July 2013	Freedom and Justice
Minister of Sports	El Amry Farouk	2 August 2012	8 July 2013	Independent
