= Khaled Azhari =

Egyptian politician (born 1966)

Minister of Manpower and Immigration
- In office 2 August 2012 – 4 July 2013
- Prime Minister: Hisham Qandil
- Succeeded by: Kamal Abu Eita

Personal details
- Born: Khaled Mahmoud Azhari; 16 December 1966 (age 59)
- Party: Freedom and Justice Party
- Education: Chemical Technical Institute; Higher Institute of Islamic Studies

Khaled Azhari (born 16 December 1966) is an Egyptian politician and the former minister of manpower and immigration. He was one of the Freedom and Justice Party (FJP) members serving in the Qandil cabinet.

== Early life and education ==
Azhari was born on 16 December 1966. He received a Bachelor of Science degree from the Chemical Technical Institute in 1987. Then he obtained a LL.B. in law in 2002 and a master's degree in sharia and law from the Higher Institute of Islamic Studies in 2004.

== Career ==
Azhari worked as a director of quality control at the Amal Petroleum Company. He is the vice president of the Egyptian Federation of Trade Unions, and a member of the General Union of Egyptian Workers. He was one of the victims of police brutality in 2010.

=== Political career ===
Azhari was elected to the People's Assembly for the FJP in 2011. In January 2012, he was named deputy chairman of the parliamentary manpower committee. He was also among the Constituent Assembly's 85 members. The Assembly was charged with the writing of Egypt's new constitution.

He was appointed minister of manpower and immigration on 2 August 2012. His appointment led to suspicions over the Brotherhood's potential to dominate labor affairs in Egypt. He and other FJP members in the cabinet resigned from office on 4 July 2013 following the 2013 coup in Egypt. His term officially ended on 16 July 2013 when the interim government led by Hazem Al Beblawi was formed.

Azhari was arrested on 29 August 2013 by security forces in Giza, along with senior leader Mohamed Elbeltagy and Jamal al-Ishri, another brotherhood official.
