= Osama Yassin =

Egyptian politician

Minister of Youth
- In office 2 August 2012 – 4 June 2013
- Prime Minister: Hisham Qandil
- Succeeded by: Khaled Abdel Aziz

Personal details
- Born: 25 December 1964 (age 61)
- Party: Freedom and Justice Party

Osama Yassin Abdel Wahab (Arabic: أسامة ياسين عبد الوهاب; born 25 December 1964) is the former minister of youth of Egypt. He was part of the Qandil Cabinet and one of the five Freedom and Justice (FJP) members in the first cabinet. He is also one of the leading members of the FJP.

== Early life and education ==
Yassin was born on 25 December 1964. He received a BS in medicine and surgery in 1989 and a master's degree in pediatric medicine in 1994.

== Career ==
Yassin served as a medical specialist and advisor in the pediatric unit of Ain Shams University's hospital from 1994 to 2010. He is a member of the World Allergy Organization and a founding member of the Egyptian Pediatric Allergy and Immunity Group.

== Political career ==
Yassin is one of the very active Brotherhood members since he joined the group in 1985 and became the spokesperson for the group. He was a member of the Brotherhood's central Cairo administrative office from 2005 to 2011. He is a member of the so-called "iron organization," a strong, committed faction in the Brotherhood led by Khairat Al Shater, who is the Brotherhood's first deputy chairman and the deputy general guide.

During Egyptian Revolution of 2011, he acted as the group's field coordinator. In fact, he was the de facto "security chief" in Tahrir Square during the protests that had resulted in toppling of the former President Hosni Mubarak. After the revolution, he took part in the establishment of the Freedom and Justice Party, and he was elected to the People's Assembly in November 2011. In January 2012, he was named the chairman of the parliamentary Youth Committee. He was among the potential candidates for the head of the Freedom and Justice Party (FJP) after the election of President Mohamed Morsi. He is also the assistant secretary-general of the FJP. In addition, he is a member of the Constituent Assembly that drafted Egypt's new constitution.

He was appointed minister of youth to the Qandil cabinet on 2 August 2012. He and other FJP members in the cabinet resigned from office on 4 July 2013 following the 2013 coup in Egypt. His term officially ended on 16 July 2013 when the interim government led by Hazem Al Beblawi was formed.

He then participated in protests in Rabaa Square before being arrested and put into solitary confinement.
