= Salah Abdel Maqsoud =

Egyptian journalist and politician

Minister of Information
- In office 2 August 2012 – 4 June 2013
- Prime Minister: Hisham Qandil
- Preceded by: Ahmed Anis
- Succeeded by: Durriyah Sharaf Al Din

Personal details
- Born: 13 June 1958 (age 68) Sharqia Governorate, Egypt
- Party: Freedom and Justice Party
- Education: Cairo University

Salah Abdel Maqsoud (Arabic: صلاح عبد المقصود) was the minister of information of Egypt as part of the Qandil Cabinet.

== Early life and education ==
Maqsoud was born on 13 June 1958 in Sharqia Governorate. He received a Bachelor of Arts degree in journalism from Cairo University in 1980.

== Career ==
Maqsoud is a member of the Muslim Brotherhood. He is a journalist, and was one of the leading figures in the Journalists' Syndicate. He began his journalist career in 1979 and mostly worked for Dar El Tahrir publication house. He wrote for various Islamist magazines such as Dawa al Bashir (1985), the Banner of Islam (1987 and 1994) and Harvest of Thought (1992). He also served as the head of the Arab Media Center, which is the media training center of the Muslim Brotherhood.

Maqsoud became a member of the Freedom and Justice Party and worked as a spokesman during the election campaign of Mohamed Morsi. He also writes articles for the website of the party. He was appointed minister of information to the cabinet headed by Hisham Qandil on 2 August 2012, replacing Ahmed Anis. He and other FJP members in the cabinet resigned from office on 4 July 2013 following the 2013 coup in Egypt. His term officially ended on 16 July 2013 when the interim cabinet led by prime minister Hazem Al Beblawi was formed.
