= Tarek Wafik =

Egyptian politician

Minister of Housing
- In office 2 August 2012 – 16 July 2013
- Prime Minister: Hisham Qandil
- Preceded by: Fathi El Baradei

Personal details
- Party: Freedom and Justice Party
- Education: Cairo University; University of Colorado

Tarek Wafik Mohamed is an Egyptian urban planner and former minister of housing during the Qandil Cabinet. He was the first housing minister of Egypt who is a specialist in urban development.

== Education ==
Wafik studied architecture at Cairo University. He received a PhD in natural resources and planning from the University of Colorado.

== Career ==
Wafik is an urban planning professional and economics expert. He served as an urban planning professor at Cairo University. He also dealt with business activities and headed the Eco Plan Consulting, a private firm based in Giza. He is a member of the Freedom and Justice Party (FJP) and also, a member of the party's high board. Wafik developed the regional and urban dimensions of the Muslim Brotherhood's the Renaissance Project and is head of the FJP's internal housing committee. He is also one of the members of the Engineers Syndicate after the Muslim Brotherhood won the majority of its seats. He headed the housing portfolio during Morsi's presidential campaign.

He was appointed minister of housing in August 2012, replacing Fathi El Baradie. He was one of the FJP members serving in the Qandil cabinet. Wafik's term ended on 16 July 2013 when the interim government led by Hazem Al Beblawi was formed.
