= Amr Darrag =

Egyptian politician

Minister of Planning and International Cooperation
- In office 7 May 2013 – 4 July 2013
- Prime Minister: Hisham Qandil
- Preceded by: Ashraf Al Arabi

Personal details
- Born: October 1958 (age 67)
- Party: Freedom and Justice Party
- Children: 3
- Education: Cairo University; Purdue University

Ahmed Amr Darrag (born October 1958) is the founder and chairman of the Egyptian Institute for Studies (EIS). EIS is a think tank based in Istanbul, Turkey. He is an Egyptian engineer and politician, who briefly served as Egypt's minister of planning and international cooperation from 7 May to 4 July 2013 under the Freedom and Justice Party-led government.

== Early life and education ==
Darrag was born in October 1958. He holds a bachelor's degree in civil engineering and a master's degree in soil mechanics and foundations both of which he received from Cairo University in 1980 and 1984, respectively. He also obtained a PhD in soil mechanics and foundations from Purdue University in 1987.

== Career ==
Darrag began his career in 1987 as a senior engineer for Erdman and Associates Inc. in Orlando, Florida, where he worked for one year. He served as the board chairman at Egyptian engineering consultancy firm, Engineering House of Expertise. He also worked as professor of geotechnical engineering at Cairo University. In addition, he served as director of corporate planning and business development at the Egyptian Group for Engineering Consultations (EGEC).

He is one of the founding members of the Freedom and Justice Party (FJP), a Muslim Brotherhood-affiliated Islamist party in Egypt. He served as the party secretary in Giza governorate. He was appointed chairman of the party's foreign relations committee in July 2012 and also, served as chairman of its development and planning committee. He is a member of the higher commission and executive board of the party. He was secretary general of the constituent assembly that was tasked with drafting Egypt's 2012 constitution.

In the general elections of 2011, he ran for a parliamentary seat in Giza on the list of the FJP, but lost the election. On 7 May 2013, Darrag was appointed minister of planning and international cooperation to the cabinet headed by prime minister Hisham Qandil. Darrag replaced Ashraf Al Arabi in the post. He and other FJP members in the cabinet resigned from office on 4 July 2013 following the 2013 coup in Egypt. His term officially ended on 16 July 2013 when the interim government led by Hazem Al Beblawi was formed.

== Personal life ==
Darrag is married and has three daughters.
