= Osama Saleh =

Egyptian economist and politician

Minister of Investment
- In office 16 July 2013 – 1 March 2014
- President: Adly Mansour
- Prime Minister: Hazem Al Beblawi
- Preceded by: Yehya Hamed
- In office 2 August 2012 – 7 May 2013
- President: Mohamad Morsi
- Prime Minister: Hesham Qandil
- Succeeded by: Yehya Hamed

Personal details
- Born: 2 July 1960 (age 66)
- Party: Independent
- Education: Cairo University

Osama Saleh (born 2 July 1960) is an Egyptian economist, who served as the minister of investment of Egypt from 2 August 2012 to 7 May 2013. He was part of the Qandil Cabinet. He stayed as investment minister in the 2013 interim government.

== Early life and education ==
Saleh was born in 1960. He is a graduate of the faculty of commerce at Cairo University and graduated in 1982.

== Career ==
Saleh was the chairman of the Egyptian Mortgage Finance Authority (EMF) from 2005 to July 2009. In September 2009, he was appointed chairman of the General Authority for Investment (GAFI) under Nazif's cabinet. He is also a board member of the Egyptian Financial Supervisory Authority. In addition, he also served as Regional Manager of American Express Bank Ltd. He has been a visitor professor of finance at American University in Cairo since 2008.

In August 2012, he was appointed minister of investment as part of the Qandil cabinet. This ministry was disestablished during the Mobarak era. His term ended on 7 May 2013 and he was succeeded by Yehya Hamed in the post in a cabinet reshuffle. On 16 July 2013, Saleh was again appointed minister of investment to the interim cabinet led by Hazem Al Beblawi, replacing Yehya Hamed.
