= Adel Abdel-Hamid =

Egyptian politician and judge

Adel Abdel-Hamid (born December 2, 1939 ) was the Minister of Justice of Egypt in the interim government of Hazem Al Beblawi. He was appointed and took oath of office before acting President Adly Mansour on 21 July 2013.

== Biography ==
Adel Abdel-Hamid was born in 1939. He graduated from Cairo University's law faculty in 1960. He worked in prosecution until appointed a judge at Giza Court of First Instance in July 1973. In March 1984 he was appointed a counselor at the Court of Cassation. In June 1989 he was appointed deputy chief of the Court of Cassation. In July 2009 he was appointed head of the Court of Cassation and chairman of the Supreme Judicial Council.

In December 2011 Abdel-Hamid was appointed Minister of Justice in the interim cabinet of Kamal el-Ganzouri. On 2 August 2012 he was replaced as Justice Minister by Ahmed Mekki in the Qandil Cabinet.
