= Ahmed Galal (politician) =

Egyptian economist and politician (born 1948)

Minister of Finance
- In office 16 July 2013 – 1 March 2014
- Prime Minister: Hazem Al Beblawi
- Preceded by: Fayyad Abdel Moneim
- Succeeded by: Hani Qadri Demian

Personal details
- Born: 1948 (age 77–78)
- Party: Independent
- Education: Cairo University; American University in Cairo; Boston University
- Profession: Economist

Ahmed Galal (born 1948) is an Egyptian economist and politician, who was appointed minister of finance in the interim government headed by Hazem Al Beblawi on 16 July 2013.

== Early life and education ==
Galal was born in 1948. He received a bachelor's degree in business administration from Cairo University in 1973. Next he obtained a master's degree in economics from the American University in Cairo in 1984. He also holds a PhD in economics, which he received from Boston University in 1986.

== Career ==
Galal began his career at World Bank in 1984 where he worked for eighteen years. He was the executive director and director of research of the Egyptian Center for Economic Studies (ECES) for two terms (1996–1997 and 2000–2006). In 2007 he was appointed member of the international board of governors of the International Development Research Center in Canada. He is the president of Forum Euroméditerranéen des Instituts de Sciences Économiques (FEMISE) in France and the founding co-chairman of the board of the MENA Health Policy Forum in Jordan.

He has been the managing director of the Economic Research Forum (ERF), a Cairo-based non-governmental research institution on the Middle East, since 2007. He was involved in the economic development initiative started by Prime Minister Hisham Qandil in December 2012. Galal, an independent politician, was appointed finance minister on 16 July 2013 to the interim government led by Prime Minister Hazem Al Beblawi.

His tenure ended in March 2014. He has been working as an external expert at the Policy Center for the New South.

Galal has been author of various publications on economy and finance.
