= Salah Abdel Moamen =

Egyptian politician

Minister of Agriculture and Lands Reclamation
- In office 2 August 2012 – 7 May 2013
- Prime Minister: Hisham Qandil
- Succeeded by: Ahmed Gezawi

Personal details
- Party: Independent
- Education: University of Texas

Salah Mohammad Abdel Moamen or Momen was the Egypt's minister of agriculture and lands reclamation from 2012 to 2013.

== Education ==
Moamen holds a PhD in plant pathology from the University of Texas.

== Career ==
Moamen served the president of the institute of plant pathology research and as the vice president of the agricultural research centre. Then he became the president of the research center. He was appointed minister of agriculture and lands reclamation to the Qandil cabinet in August 2012. He is one of the independent and non-political appointees in the cabinet. On 7 May 2013, he was succeeded by Ahmed Gezawi in the post in a cabinet reshuffle.
