= Laithi Nassef =

Lieutenant General Muhammad Al-Laithi Nassef (1922 - August 24, 1973) was the founder of the Egyptian Republican Guard and its first commander. He supported President Muhammad Anwar Sadat in eliminating the centers of power, as he arrested Sadat's opponents, senior leaders and officials in the state. What was known as the Correction Revolution on May 15, 1971.

== Death ==
He died in mysterious circumstances on August 24, 1973. While he was with his family in the British capital, London, to receive treatment after he fell in a strange way from the balcony of the apartment he lived in in the Stuart Tower building in the Maida Vale area of London, from the eleventh floor (it is the same tower from which the Egyptian artist Soad Hosny fell in 2001).
