= El Fadila =

El Fadila may refer to:

- El Vadila, a political party in Mauritania
- Islamic Virtue Party, a political party in Iraq
- Virtue Party (Egypt)
