= Gamal El-Araby =

Egyptian politician

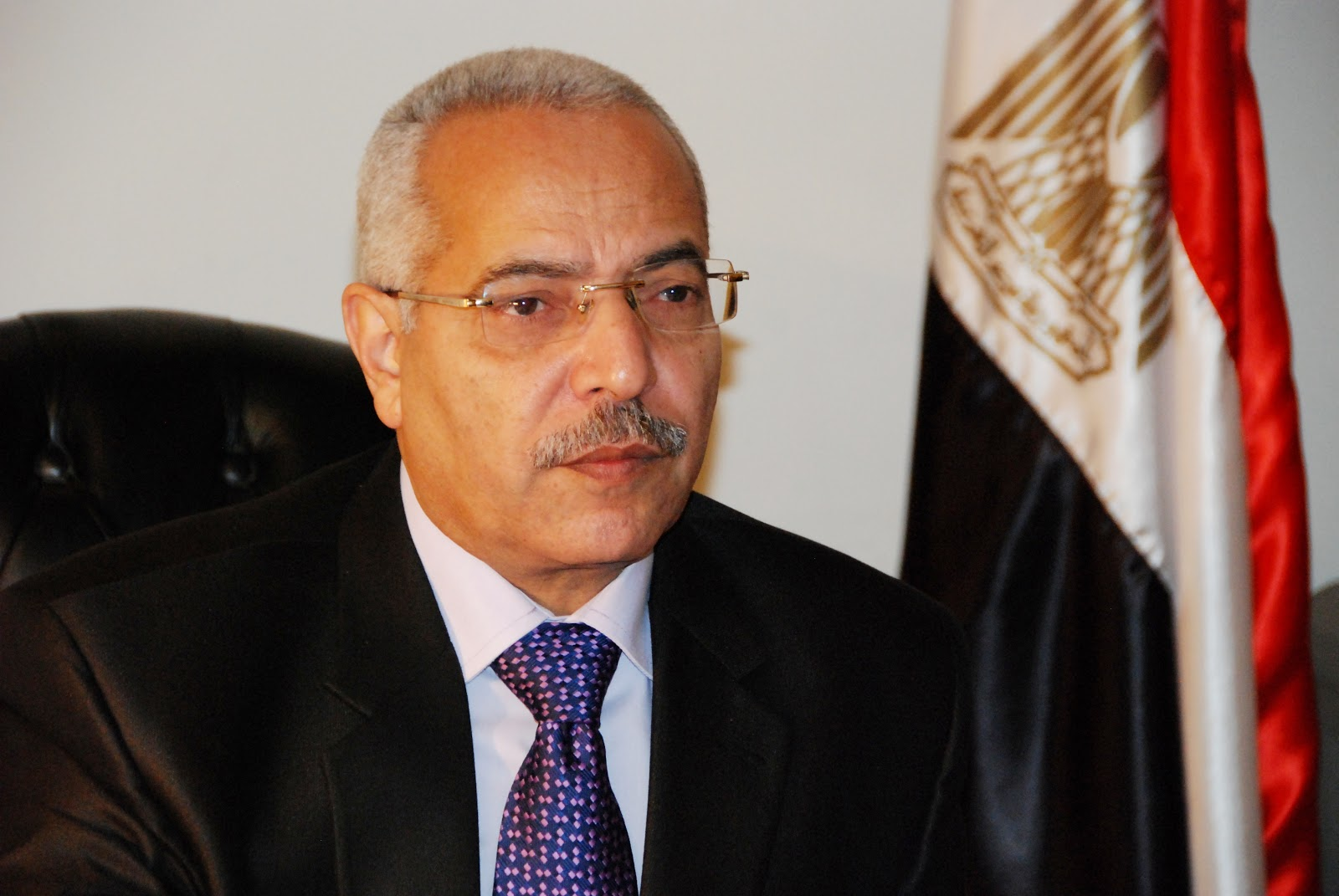

Minister of Education
- In office 7 December 2011 – 24 July 2012
- Prime Minister: Kamal Ganzouri
- Preceded by: Ahmed Gamal El-Din Moussa
- Succeeded by: Ibrahim Deif

Personal details
- Born: 4 September 1954 (age 72) Banha, Qalyubia Governorate
- Education: Ain Shams University; University of East Anglia
- Occupation: Politician, teacher

Gamal El-Araby Ahmad (Arabic: جمال العربي, born 4 September 1954) is an Egyptian politician who served as Minister of Education from December 2011 to July 2012 in the Cabinet of Kamal Ganzouri.

He was educated at Ain Shams University and the University of East Anglia. He was formerly a mathematics teacher.

== Professional Experience ==
- Head of the Central Administration of Secondary Education, Ministry of Education
- Undersecretary of the Ministry of Education in Qalyubiya
- Undersecretary of the Ministry of Education in Dakahlia
- Director General of Banha Management 30/6/2008
- Appointed Director General of Banha Educational Administration as of 12/3/2008
- Director of Banha Educational Administration 2007–2008
- Director of the Training Center 2001–2007
- Mathematics instructor 1995–2001
- Teaching Mathematics as a teacher and first teacher 1976–1995

== Achievements ==
- First place in the competition of the distinguished director at the level of the center – New Horizon
- The first place in the contest of distinguished director at the governorate level – Ministry of Administrative Development
- The ideal leader in the governorate of Qalioubia sub-committee Benha
- The ideal teacher at the level of the Republic – General Union of Teachers
