= Nagwa Khalil =

Egyptian politician

Nagwa Hussein Khalil

Minister of Social Affairs and Insurance
- Incumbent
- Assumed office 2 August 2012
- President: Mohamad Morsi
- Prime Minister: Hesham Qandil

Personal details
- Party: Independent
- Education: Cairo University

Nagwa Hussein Khalil was the Egyptian minister of social affairs and insurance. She was sworn into prime minister Hesham Qandil's cabinet on 2 August 2012, following the Egyptian revolution that deposed president Hosni Mubarak. She was one of the independent ministers in the cabinet, as well as only one of two women in the cabinet.

== Early life and education ==
Khalil obtained her PhD from the Cairo University, where her thesis was titled "The problems of Egyptian society following the Second World War."

== Non-political career ==
Khalil served as a member of a fact-finding committee which was mandated to investigate the violent events that occurred during the Egyptian Revolution of 2011.

== Political career ==
The Ministry of Social Affairs and Insurance was eliminated six years prior to the Egyptian revolution of 2011, but was reinstated during the interim government of the then prime minister Kamal Ganzouri. Khalil served as the minister of social affairs and insurance in the Ganzouri's cabinet. She continued to serve in this post as part of Qandil's Cabinet. On 2 August 2012, Khalil was sworn in. Khalil's first statement after she was appointed was that she would work to increase pensions in Egypt.

In late August, Khalil told Al-Masry Al-Youm that some members of the Muslim Brotherhood approached her to legalize a bill on civil society organizations, which would allow the Muslim Brotherhood to legalize its status and end controversy over the issue. However, Khalil said that they did not submit formal requests, because they feared that due to "the number of its members, sources of funding and unlawful objectives would be exposed."

== See also ==
- Elections in Egypt
- List of political parties in Egypt
- Timeline of the 2011-2012 Egyptian revolution under Supreme Council of the Armed Forces
