= Mohamed Mahsoub =

Egyptian politician

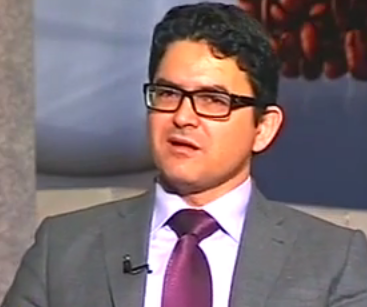

Minister of Legal Affairs
- In office 2 August 2012 – 26 December 2012
- President: Mohamed Morsi
- Prime Minister: Hesham Qandil
- Preceded by: Office established
- Succeeded by: Omar Salem

Personal details
- Party: Wasat Party

Mohamed Mahsoub Abdel Meguid is an Egyptian politician and former minister of legal affairs, who served in the Qandil cabinet for a short time in 2012.

== Career and activities ==
Mahsoub is one of the vice-presidents of the Al Wasat Party, a moderate Islamist party. The party consists mainly of former members of the Muslim Brotherhood. In 2000, Mahsoub was a candidate in the parliamentary elections as independent candidate; however, he was not elected.

He was appointed minister of state for parliamentary affairs, being the only member of the party serving in the cabinet, on 2 August 2012. He was also head of the drafting committee and a member of the Constituent Assembly charged with drafting Egypt’s new constitution.

Mahsoub resigned from his post on 27 December 2012 in protest against the decision by President Mohamed Morsi to reshuffle the cabinet but keep prime minister Hesham Qandil. Omar Salem succeeded him as state minister for parliamentary affairs in a cabinet reshuffle on 5 January 2013.

On 29 July 2013, Mahsoub was part of a delegation of the National Coalition for Supporting Legitimacy that met the High Representative of the European Union for Foreign Policy, Catherine Ashton, in Cairo to discuss possible solutions for the crisis in Egypt in the aftermath of the military coup.

=== Controversy ===
In July 2013, following the military coup against president Morsi, the Twitter account of Mahsoub was hacked by unknown persons, and fake tweets were posted in his name, claiming that the Muslim Brotherhood is burning Egypt and intending to produce seas of blood in order to blame it on the army.
