= Talaat Afifi =

Egyptian academic

Minister of Religious Endowments (Awqaf)
- In office 2 August 2012 – 16 July 2013
- Prime Minister: Hisham Qandil
- Preceded by: Mohamed Abdel Fadil

Personal details
- Born: Talaat Mohamed Afifi Salem
- Party: Independent
- Website: Official website

Talaat Afifi (Arabic: طلعت محمد عفيفي سالم) is an Egyptian professor at Al Azhar University. He served as Egypt's minister of religious endowments (Awqaf) from August 2012 to July 2013 and was part of the Qandil Cabinet.

== Career and views ==
Afifi was the dean of the faculty of preaching at Al Azhar University. He also served the deputy head of the Islamic Legal Body for Rights and Reform, comprising more than a hundred of Egypt's leading Islamic scholars and activists.

He was appointed minister of religious endowments (Awqaf) on 2 August 2012, replacing Mohamed Abdel Fadil. He was one of the independent members in the cabinet. However, Omar Ashour from the Brookings Institution states that Afifi was one of the Muslim Brotherhood's allies in the cabinet. Afifi's term ended on 16 July 2013.
