= Ahmed Mekki (politician) =

Former Egyptian Minister of Justice

Minister of Justice
- In office 2 August 2012 – 20 April 2013
- President: Mohamad Morsi
- Prime Minister: Hesham Qandil
- Preceded by: Adel Abdel Hamid
- Succeeded by: Ahmed Sulaiman

Personal details
- Born: 1941 (age 84–85)
- Party: Independent
- Education: Alexandria University

Ahmed Mekki (born 1941) was the Minister of Justice of Egypt from 2 August 2012 until he submitted his resignation to President Morsi on 20 April 2013. He was a member of the Qandil Cabinet. Mekki was one of the independent ministers in the cabinet. He is the brother of the former vice president Mahmoud Mekki, who resigned from office on 22 December 2012.

== Early life and education ==
Mekki was born in 1941. He studied law at Alexandria University and graduated in 1961.

== Career ==
Mekki is the former deputy head of the Court of Cassation, Egypt’s highest appeals court. He was also the chairman of the fact-finding Committee in the Egyptian Judges Club.

On 2 August 2012, he began to serve as minister of justice in the cabinet led by prime minister Hesham Qandil, replacing Adel Abdel Hamid. Although Mekki was an independent member of the cabinet, he is close to the Muslim Brotherhood. Mekki resigned from office on 20 April 2013. His resignation was due to pressure from both the opposition and Brotherhood supporters. In a reshuffle of May 2013, Ahmed Sulaiman was appointed minister of justice, succeeding Mekki in the post.

=== Views ===
Mekki is a strong supporter of judicial independence. He was known as "a reformist judge", and "the revolution’s representative" in Qandil’s government. After his appointment, Mekki argued that Egypt is an Islamic state governed by Islamic traditions.
