= Abdel Qawi Khalifa =

Egyptian academic and engineer

Minister of Utilities, Drinking Water and Sewage
- In office 2 August 2012 – 16 July 2013
- Prime Minister: Hisham Qandil
- Preceded by: Office established

Personal details
- Party: National Democratic Party (Formerly); Independent
- Education: Ain Shams University; University of Pittsburgh; University of Windsor

Abdel Qawi Khalifa is an Egyptian engineer, academic, former governor of the Cairo province and former minister of water and wastewater utilities, a ministerial office established in August 2012.

== Education ==
Khalifa holds bachelor of science and master of science degrees in civil engineering both from Ain Shams University in Cairo. He also received a master of science degree in petroleum engineering from the University of Pittsburgh. He obtained a PhD in civil engineering from the University of Windsor in Canada.

== Career ==
Khalifa is a university professor. He has a long experience in the fields related to water projects management and civil engineering. He served as a consultant for the hydraulics and sediment research institute at the Egyptian ministry of public works and water resources from 1988 to 1990. Then he dealt with business activities, being the owner of Khalifa Consulting Engineers (KCE) office from 1990 to 2004. He is back again to share the KCE company from 2013 until now.

He worked in the public sector and served as chairman of the Egyptian Holding Company for Water and Wastewater at the Ministry of Housing from 2004 to 2011. Khalifa was appointed governor of Cairo in April 2011. He was the first Cairo governor to be appointed after the Egyptian Revolution that ousted President Hosni Mubarak on 11 February 2011. Khalifa served in the post until August 2012.

Khalifa was appointed minister of utilities, drinking water and sewage in August 2012 as part of the cabinet led by Prime Minister Hisham Qandil, and was an independent minister. His tenure ended on 17 July 2013 when the interim government led by Prime Minister Hazem Al Beblawi was formed.
