= Nadia Zakhary =

Egyptian minister of scientific research

Nadia Eskandar Zakhary

Minister of Scientific Research
- In office December 2011 – 2013
- President: Mohamad Morsi
- Prime Minister: Kamal Ganzouri; Hesham Qandil

Personal details
- Party: Independent

Nadia Eskandar Zakhary (Coptic: ⲛⲁⲇⲓⲁ ⲁⲗⲉⲝⲁⲛⲇⲣⲟⲥ ⲍⲁⲭⲁⲣⲓ) was the Egyptian minister of scientific research between 2 August 2012 and 2013. She was part of the Qandil Cabinet and one of the independent ministers in the cabinet. Zachary was the only member in the cabinet who is a member of the Coptic Christian group, representing about 10% of the population.

== Education and career ==
Zakhary obtained a PhD in Medical Biochemistry from the University of Cairo. She was professor of biochemistry and tumour biology at Egypt's National Cancer Institute. She was also the chair of the Department of Oncology at the Institute of Biology of tumors. She has more than 60 research publications in international scientific journals. She also served as the minister of scientific research in the interim government headed by Kamal Ganzouri.
