= Mostafa Hussein Kamel =

Egyptian politician (born 1960)

Mostafa Hussein Kamel Ahmed Mostafa

Minister of State for Environmental Affairs
- In office 2 August 2012 – 5 January 2013
- President: Mohamad Morsi
- Prime Minister: Hesham Qandil
- Preceded by: Himself
- Succeeded by: Khaled Abdel Aal

Minister of State for Environmental Affairs
- In office December 2011 – 2 August 2012
- Prime Minister: Kamal Ganzouri
- Preceded by: Maged George

Personal details
- Born: 23 March 1960 (age 66) Beni Suef
- Party: Independent
- Education: Cairo University
- Profession: Geophysicist

Mostafa Hussein Kamel Ahmed Mostafa (born 23 March 1960; Arabic: مصطفى حسين كامل أحمد مصطفى) is an Egyptian politician. He served as the Minister of State for Environmental Affairs from December 2011 to August 2012. He was sworn into Prime Minister Hesham Qandil's cabinet, the Qandil Cabinet, on 2 August 2012, following the 2011–2012 Egyptian revolution that deposed President Hosni Mubarak, retaining his position from former Prime Minister Kamal Ganzouri's interim government. He was one of the independent ministers in the cabinet.

== Early life and education ==
Mostafa Hussein Kamel is a Professor of Cairo University. He was born in Beni Suef, Egypt, on 23 March 1960.

He attended Cairo University, which he graduated from Faculty of Science in 1981 with a Bachelor of Science degree in geology and in 1989 a PhD in geophysics.

== Non-political career ==
Kamel is a geophysicist and taught as a professor at Cairo University's science department. He also served as the director of Cairo University's Centre for Combating Environmental Hazards and the Basel Regional Center for Training and Technology Transfer across the Arab Region from 2 August 2010 until 6 December 2011. From 19 July 2003 until 8 October 2011, Kamel served as Chairman of the Geophysics Department, Faculty of Science at Cairo University as well as the geophysics branch at the university.

== Political career ==
Kamel was sworn into former Prime Minister Kamal el-Ganzouri's interim government, which was established after the Egyptian revolution of 2011–2012. In doing so, he replaced Maged George, who had served as the minister since 2004.

He retained this position in Prime Minister Qandil's Qandil Cabinet, after the Salafi Al-Nour Party declined the position, believing it to be an "insult" and not important enough. He was sworn into the cabinet on 2 August 2012. A number of environmentalists were dismayed over his appointment, believing that he cannot address Egypt's environment, which they said is in a "critical state" and Egyptians cannot waste "time with leftover government officials." Following his appointment to the ministry, some environmentalists who view the ministry as dangerous to the environment have proposed dismantling the ministry altogether. In a cabinet reshuffle on 5 January 2013, Kamel was replaced by Khaled Abdel Aal.

=== Nature reserves visit ===
In early August 2012, he paid a visit to certain nature reserves located in the Sinai Peninsula. The purpose of the visit was to listen to workers' demands and complaints regarding the reserves, which would be incorporated into an attempt to change the maintenance of these reserves, with an independent body that is affiliated with Egypt's Environmental Affairs Ministry controlling the reserves. In addition, Kamel stressed the importance of decentralization, and also promised to work and fix the problems that the workers at the reserves voiced.
