= Osama Kamal =

Egyptian government minister

Minister of Petroleum and Mineral Resources
- In office 2 August 2012 – 7 May 2013
- President: Mohamad Morsi
- Prime Minister: Hesham Qandil
- Succeeded by: Sherif Haddara

Personal details
- Born: 5 April 1959 (age 67) Zagazig, Egypt

Osama Kamal (Arabic: أسامة كمال; born 5 April 1959) was the Egyptian minister of petroleum and mineral resources. He was sworn into President Mohamad Morsi's cabinet, the Qandil Cabinet, on 2 August 2012, following the 2011–2012 Egyptian uprising that deposed President Hosni Mubarak. He was in office until 6 May 2013.

== Early life and education ==
Kamal was born on 5 April 1959 in the Nile Delta city Zagazig. He attended Cairo University, faculty of engineering, and graduated from the chemical engineering department in 1982. Kamal began his career at the state-owned Engineering for Petroleum and Process Industries (Enppi) as an engineer. A few years later, Kamal switched to another public-sector energy company, known as Petrojet.

== The Egyptian Petrochemicals Holding Company ==
Osama Kamal helped establish Egyptian Petrochemicals Holding Company (Echem) in 2002, which belongs to Egypt's petroleum ministry, and is mandated with managing and developing Egypt's petrochemicals industry. Kamal was appointed chairman of Echem in 2009. While Kamal was in charge of Echem, a crisis erupted pertaining the Agrium fertiliser plant in the Nile Delta city of Damietta. In 2008, Agrium, which is 30% owned by Echem, was faced with a popular campaign that alleged that the factory was bad for the environment, causing Egypt's government to abruptly cancel the project. Agrium was offered a 26% stake in the state-owned Egyptian fertilizer producer MOPCO instead. However, the project resumed in 2011, which dragged Agrium and Echem into more controversy. The project was completed and started operation in 2016.

== Carbon Holdings ==
Currently Eng. Osama Kamal resides on the board of the Egyptian industrial company, Carbon Holdings. In addition he acts as a Chief Strategy Officer.

== Political career ==
On 2 August 2012, Kamal was sworn into the Qandil Cabinet, as the minister of petroleum and mineral resources. His term ended on 7 May 2013 and he was replaced by Sherif Haddara in the post.

== Personal life ==
Kamal is married and has three daughters and Five grandchildren.
