= Ali Sabry =

Ali Sabry or Ali Sabri is an Arabic name given to

- Ali Sabri (1920–1991), Egyptian politician
- Ali Sabri Raheem (born 1963), Sri Lankan politician
- Ali Sabry (Egyptian politician), former Egyptian minister
- Ali Sabry (Sri Lankan politician), Sri Lankan lawyer and politician, Minister of Justice and Foreign Affairs
