= Republican Guard headquarters clashes =

Clashes between pro-Morsi protesters and the military

- Part of the Post-coup unrest in Egypt (2013–14)
Date	8 July 2013
Location	Republican Guard Headquarters; Heliopolis, Cairo, Egypt 30°04′51″N 31°19′00″E

Belligerents
Pro-Morsi protesters Supported by: Muslim Brotherhood	Egyptian Armed Forces; Republican Guard

Commanders and leaders
Mohammed Badie (Supreme Guide of the Muslim Brotherhood)	Abdul Fatah al-Sisi (Commander-in-Chief & Defense Minister)

Units involved
	Egyptian Republican Guard; Egyptian Army

Strength
Unknown	Unknown

Casualties and losses
61 protesters killed	3 military and security personnel killed

On the morning of 8 July 2013 at the Republican Guard headquarters in Cairo, Egypt there was a clash between protesters seeking the return of deposed President Mohamed Morsi, and the military, who were protecting the institution. According to the Forensic Medical Authority, at least 61 protesters seeking the return of Morsi to power were killed and more than 435 injured in the clashes, in what has been deemed a massacre by the Muslim Brotherhood and those opposed to the recent coup d'état. Amnesty International has condemned the military's disproportionate use of force, with a spokesperson stating, "Even if some protesters used violence, the response was disproportionate and led to the loss of life and injury among peaceful protesters."

== Incident ==
According to some witnesses, the military opened fire without provocation towards the end of morning prayers, immediately using live ammunition and shooting to kill. Gehad El-Haddad, the Muslim Brotherhood's spokesman, claimed that the military opened fire at the protesters while they were praying in front of the Republican Guard and staging a peaceful sit-in. One witness claimed that protestors had their backs to the Republic Guard building, as they were praying towards Mecca. Others claimed that the incident was after prayers. Some protestors claimed that police officer Mohamed el-Mesairy was sheltering in his parked car when he was killed by military gunfire striking the car.

According to the military, a "terrorist group" tried to storm the Republican Guard headquarters and that it had retaliated by opening fire at the attackers. A military spokesman reported that an officer was killed and six troops were injured before adding that 42 troops were injured and eight were in critical condition. An amateur video recording showed people holding guns from the side of the protesters during daylight.

== Investigation ==
Preliminary investigations claimed that the crime scene contained firearms, ammunition, Freedom and Justice Party membership cards, explosives that contained pieces of glass, smoke grenades and a document that contained a list of names with monetary values next to it.

The army said it had arrested over 200 people, with "large quantities of firearms, ammunition and Molotov cocktails".

== Domestic response ==
- The interim presidency ordered the formation of a judicial committee to investigate the killings at the "raid against the Republican Guard headquarters".
- Prime Minister Hesham Qandil resigned from office effective immediately in protest of the bloodshed.
- The National Salvation Front condemned "all acts of violence" and called for an investigation over the incident.
- The Nour Party objected to the incident and stated that they would stop participating in the political transition.
- The Freedom and Justice Party called for "the international community and international groups and all the free people of the world to intervene to stop further massacres [...] and prevent a new Syria in the Arab world."
- Former presidential candidate and Strong Egypt Party leader Abdel Moneim Aboul Fotouh called for interim President Adly Mansour to step down in response to the clashes.

== International response ==
- Germany – The Foreign Ministry said that it was "dismayed" over reports of the violence and called for a "speedy clarification" by an independent body into the incident.
- Iran – The Foreign Ministry published a statement about recent conflicts in Egypt: "Expressing concern about Egypt's internal conflicts, we stressed the need for strict adherence to the democratic process in this country."
- Palestine Hamas expressed "extreme pain and grief for the falling of these victims".
- Qatar – Qatar expressed "great concern" over the incident.
- Turkey – Foreign Minister Ahmet Davutoğlu wrote on Twitter: "I strongly condemn the massacre that took place at morning prayers in the name of basic human values."
- United Kingdom – Foreign Secretary William Hague said: "There is an urgent need for calm and restraint".
