= Mohamed Bahaa Eldin =

Egyptian civil engineer and politician

Minister of Water and Irrigation
- In office 2 August 2012 – July 2013
- Prime Minister: Hisham Qandil
- Preceded by: Hisham Qandil
- Succeeded by: Ayman Abu Hadid

Personal details
- Born: 26 July 1947 (age 79) Cairo, Egypt
- Party: Independent
- Education: Ain Shams University; University of Southampton

Mohamed Bahaa Eldin is an Egyptian civil engineer and politician who served as minister of water and irrigation from 2 August 2012 to July 2013 as part of the Qandil cabinet.

== Early life and education ==
Eldin was born on 26 July 1947. He received a bachelor's degree in civil engineering from Ain Shams University in 1970. He holds a master's degree, which he obtained from the University of Southampton in 1980, and a PhD in civil engineering that he earned from the same university in 1986.

== Career ==
Eldin worked at the ministry of water resources and irrigationas throughout his career. He started his career as secretary general of the national water research center in 1992 and served there until 1994. From 1995 to 2001, he worked as the director of the hydraulics research institute. Then he was named as the head of the planning sector, and served for one year from 2001 to 2002. In 2007, he was appointed the general coordinator of the national plan for water resources and irrigation project. Next he served at different units of the ministry until 2011. Lastly, he was named deputy minister of water resources and irrigationas. On 2 August 2012, he was appointed minister of water resources and irrigations. He is an independent member of the cabinet led by prime minister Hisham Qandil, whom he succeeded as minister. Eldin's and the Qandil cabinet's term ended in July 2013. Eldin was replaced by Ayman Abu Hadid in the post.

== Personal life ==
Eldin is married and has children.
