= Janzouri =

Family name

Janzouri, Janzuri, Zanzuri, Zanzouri, Ganzouri, or Ganzuri, derived from the name (Egyptian Arabic: جَنْزُور), is a label referring to a person from the Egyptian City of Ganzur in Menoufia Governorate. And also Janzūr) (and zanzur (Arabic: زَنْزُور zanzūr) is same of janzur but in Libyan dialect the ǧīm change to zayn, and ganzur is same of Janzur but the ǧīm is Voiced velar stop), refer to people residing in a Libyan City with the same name. In Israel Italy, the families that reside there are Jews origin from the Libyan city of Janzour, rather than the Egyptian one, and they moved from Libya to Israel at 1949 and the rest moved to Italy at 1969.

There is also a City with the same name in Palestine, in Jenin. The Arabic term Janzour is singular, meaning chain, and its plural is "Janazeer" or Chains.

== People with surname ==
Kamal Ganzouri, who served as Prime Minister of Egypt from 2 January 1996 until 5 October 1999, and again from 25 November 2011 until 2 August 2012.
