= Pioneer Party =

Political party in Egypt

Pioneer Party حزب الريادة Al Riyada
- Leader: Haitham Abu Khalil
- Founded: 26 June 2011
- House of Representatives: 0 / 568

The Pioneer Party (Arabic: حزب الريادة Ḥizb ar-Riyadah), also known as the Leadership Party, is a civil political party in Egypt.

== History ==
The party was founded by former members of the Muslim Brotherhood. The party has decided to exclude former members of the National Democratic Party. The party joined a coalition with the Renaissance Party and the Wasat Party in Alexandria during the parliamentary elections held in 2011 and 2012.
