= Abou Elela Mady =

Egyptian politician

Abou Elela Mady أبو العلا ماضي
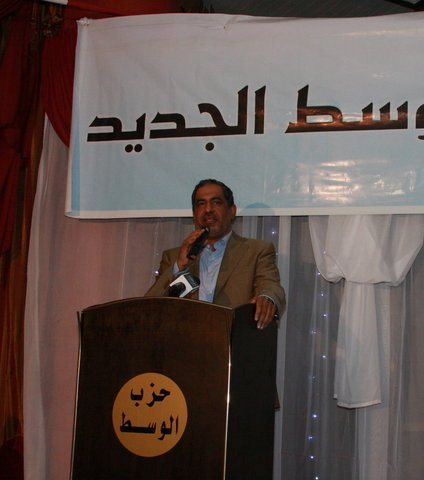

Chairman of Al-Wasat Party
- Incumbent
- Assumed office 1996 (Foundation of the party); 2011 (legalization of the party)
- Preceded by: Office created

Personal details
- Born: 3 April 1958 (age 68) Minya, Egypt
- Party: Wasat Party
- Education: Minya University
- Profession: Engineer

Abou Elela Mady (Arabic: أبو العلا ماضي) (born 3 April 1958) is an Egyptian engineer and politician. He is the chairman of the Wasat Party and a former member of the Muslim Brotherhood. He was released from detention on 13 August 2015, 2 years after being arrested.

== Education and career ==
Mady was born on 3 April 1958. He graduated from Minya University’s School of Engineering with honors in 1984, and also received a Bachelor of Laws from Cairo University.

== Politics ==
He was a member of Al-Jama'a al-Islamiyya early in his time at Minya University and was the president of the students' union at the university in 1977, and then became the president of the students' union of all the Egyptian universities in 1978. Mady joined the Muslim Brotherhood in the 1980s, and then left the Muslim Brotherhood with the aim of founding a new political party with a new vision of moderate democratic Islamic reference in 1996.

He was appointed to the Constituent Assembly of Egypt in 2012.
