= Tanta Flax and Oil Company =

- Native name: شركة طنطا للكتان والزيوت
- Romanized name: Sharikat Tanta lil-Kattan wal-Zuyūt
- Type: Private (formerly state-owned)
- Industry: Flax and oil production
- Founded: 1954
- Headquarters: Tanta, Gharbia Governorate, Egypt, Tanta, Egypt
- Area served: Egypt
- Products: Flax products, Oil products
- Owner: Private interests (since 2005)

The Tanta Flax and Oil Company is an Egypt-based manufacturer of flax products in the city of Tanta, Gharbia Governorate.

== History ==
Founded in 1954, the company was nationalized in July 1961. It was owned by the Government of Egypt until sold to a private interest in 2005 at below market-price. Protests and legal actions have occurred to reverse the sale. In September 2011, a legal action to reverse the sale succeeded but failed to be implemented by the Egyptian Government during the tumultuous political environment of the Egyptian Revolution of 2011 and 2012–13 Egyptian protests. Failure to execute a court order to re-nationalize the company led to an Egyptian appeals court to endorse a verdict on 3 July 2013, the same day of the 2013 Egyptian coup d'état, to dismiss Prime Minister Hesham Qandil of his duties and sentenced him to one year in prison. In late September 2013, the Cairo Misdemeanor Court endorsed the sentence against Qandil and he was arrested on 24 December 2013. On 13 July 2014, the Court of Cassation accepted Qandil's appeal and abolished the verdict to imprison him for a year, to remove him from his job and to fine him 2,000 Egyptian pounds ($285). He was subsequently released on 15 July 2014.
