= El Amry Farouk =

Egyptian businessman (1970–2024)

Minister of State for Sports
- In office 2 August 2012 – 2 July 2013
- Prime Minister: Hisham Qandil

Personal details
- Born: 8 November 1970 Cairo, Egypt
- Died: 26 January 2024 (aged 53) 6th of October, Egypt
- Party: Independent

El Amry Farouk (Arabic: العامري فاروق; 8 November 1970 – 26 January 2024) was an Egyptian businessman who was minister of state for sports as part of the Qandil cabinet.

== Biography ==
El Amry Farouk was born on 8 November 1970.

Farouk was one of the board members of Al Ahly Club. He served as the secretary-general of the Association of Private Schools (APS) in Egypt.

Farouk was appointed minister of state for sports on 2 August 2012. He was one of the independent ministers serving in the cabinet. Shortly after his appointment, Farouk fired the Egyptian Football Association's executive committee members and appointed a new board to run the federation. On 2 July 2013, Farouk resigned from office due to mass demonstrations in the country.

Farouk was admitted to El Moalmeen Hospital in Gezira after he fell into a coma on 7 November 2023. He was later taken to a hospital in 6th of October, and underwent brain surgery, but died on 26 January 2024 at the age of 53.
