= Ali Sabry (Egyptian politician) =

Egyptian politician

Minister of Military Production
- In office 2 August 2012 – 17 July 2013
- President: Mohamad Morsi
- Prime Minister: Hesham Qandil

Personal details
- Party: Independent

Ali Sabry is the former Egyptian minister of military production. He was sworn into Prime Minister Hesham Qandil's cabinet, the Qandil Cabinet, on 2 August 2012, following the 2011–2012 Egyptian uprising that deposed President Hosni Mubarak. He is one of the independent ministers in the cabinet.

== Political career ==
Sabry was appointed minister of military production by former Egyptian premier Kamal Ganzouri in the interim government in December 2011. On 2 August 2012, Sabry was sworn in as part of the Qandil Cabinet, retaining his post as minister of military production.
