= Virtue Party (Egypt) =

Political party in Egypt

Virtue Party (Egypt) الفضيلة Al-Fadyla
- Leader: Adel Abdel Maqsoud Afify
- Founded: March 2011
- Headquarters: Nasr City
- Ideology: Salafism
- National affiliation: National Legitimacy Support Coalition
- House of Representatives: 0 / 568

Website
- http://www.alfadyla.com/

The Virtue Party is a Salafist political party.

== History ==
Mahmoud Fathy, the founding deputy chairman, stated that the goals of the party are: to "achieve justice and equality for all citizens, equal distribution of wealth, and to guarantee legal prosecution of anyone who commits a crime against the people". Other party principles include "reform, supporting state institutions in accordance with the constitution, and restoring Egypt’s leading role in the Arab and Islamic worlds". Mostafa Mohamed, a member of the party, said that even Christians can join the party.

The party stated in September 2011 that it and the Renaissance Party would merge.

The party announced in October 2011 that it would leave the Democratic Alliance for Egypt.

The party supported Hazem Salah Abu Ismail in the 2012 Egyptian presidential election.

== Lawsuit against Islamic parties ==
The Virtue Party is one of the eleven Islamic parties targeted by a lawsuit in November 2014, when an organization named Popular Front for opposing the Brotherhoodization of Egypt sought to dissolve all political parties established "on a religious basis." The Alexandria Urgent Matters Court however ruled on 26 November 2014 that it lacked jurisdiction.
