= Beblawi Cabinet =

Egyptian prime minister

Hazem Al Beblawi Cabinet
- Cabinet of Egypt

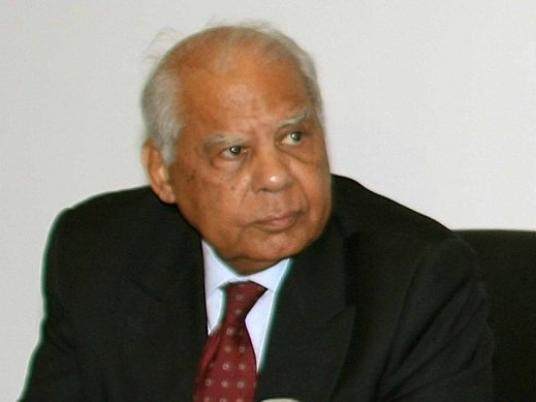
- Date formed: 16 July 2013
- Date dissolved: 1 March 2014

People and organisations
- Head of state: Adly Mansour
- Head of government: Hazem Al Beblawi
- Member party: Independent; Supported by: New Wafd Party; Dignity Party; Egyptian Social Democratic Party; Egypt Party

History
- Predecessor: Qandil Cabinet
- Successor: First Mahlab Cabinet

The cabinet of Egyptian Prime Minister Hazem Al Beblawi was sworn in on 16 July 2013. Al Beblawi was appointed on 9 July 2013 by interim president Adly Mansour. The cabinet is made up of 34 members – mostly liberal technocrats and no Islamists.

The first resignation from the cabinet was that of Mohamed ElBaradei, who had been appointed vice president in July 2013. ElBaradei resigned from office on 14 August stating "he could not bear the responsibility for decisions he disagreed with."

== Resignation ==
The government resigned unexpectedly on 24 February 2014. Some members of the cabinet have remained in office in a "caretaker" position. News sources attributed the resignation to a series of strikes in the country, a shortage of cooking gas and conflict between the security services and supporters of the Muslim Brotherhood. Beblawi gave a televised address to announce the resignation but gave no clear reason for it. The AFP quoted Hani Saleh, a government spokesman, as saying that there was a "feeling that new blood was needed."

== Cabinet members ==
Office	Name	Party
Prime Minister	Hazem Al Beblawi	Independent
Vice President	vacant	
First Deputy Prime Minister and Ministry of Defence	Abdul Fatah al-Sisi	Military
Second Deputy Prime Minister and Minister of International Cooperation	Ashraf El-Araby	Independent
Deputy Prime Minister and Ministry of Higher Education	Hossam Eisa	Independent
Ministry of Interior	Mohamed Ibrahim Moustafa	Police
Ministry of Foreign Affairs	Nabil Fahmi	Independent
Ministry of Military Production	vacant	
Ministry of Finance	Ahmed Galal	Independent
Ministry of Scientific Research	Ramzy George	Independent
Ministry of Antiquities	Mohamed Ibrahim Ali al-Sayed	Independent
Ministry of Environment	Laila Rashed Iskandar	Independent
Ministry of Local Development	Adel Labib	Independent
Ministry of Culture	Mohamed Arab	Independent
Ministry of Justice	Adel Abdel-Hamid	Independent
Ministry of Investment	Osama Saleh	Independent
Ministry of Education	Mahmoud Abo El-Nasr	Independent
Ministry of Transportation	Ibrahim El-Demairy	Independent
Ministry of Electricity and Energy	Ahmed Imam	Independent
Ministry of Tourism	Hisham Zazou	Independent
Ministry of Agriculture	Ayman Abu Hadid	Independent
Ministry of Communications and Information Technology	Atef Helmy	Independent
Ministry of Information	Durriyah Sharaf Al Din	Independent
Ministry of Petroleum	Sherif Ismail	Independent
Ministry of Water Resources and Irrigation	Mohamed Abdel Muttalib	Independent
Ministry of Housing, Utilities and Urban Development	Ibrahim Mahlab	Independent
Ministry of Supply and Internal Trade	Mohamed Abu Shadi	Independent
Ministry of Manpower and Immigration	Kamal Abu Eita	Dignity Party
Ministry of Religious Endowment (Awqaf)	Mukhtar Gomaa	Independent
Ministry of Planning	Ashraf El-Araby	Independent
Ministry of Health	Maha El-Rabat	Independent
Ministry of Civil Aviation	Abdel Aziz Fadel	Independent
Ministry of Social Solidarity	Ahmed Borai	Independent
Ministry of Industry and Trade	Mounir Fakhry Abdel Nour	Wafd Party
Ministry of State for Youth	Khaled Abdel Aziz	Egypt Party
Ministry of State for Sports	Taher Abouzeid	Wafd Party
