= Hisham Zazou =

Egyptian politician

Hisham Zaazou
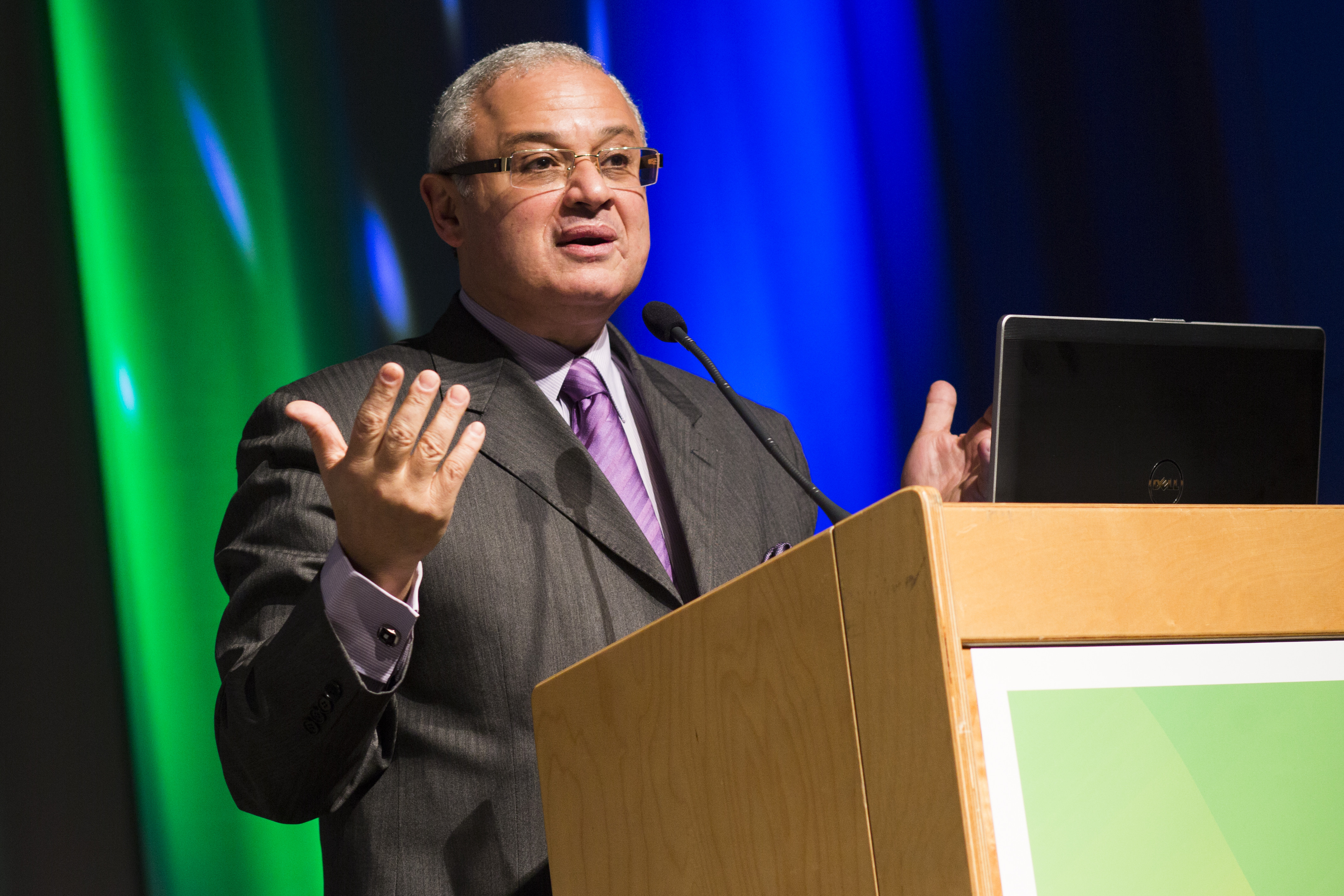

Minister of Tourism
- In office 19 September 2015 – 23 March 2016
- President: Abdel Fattah el-Sisi
- Prime Minister: Sherif Ismail
- In office 2 August 2012 – 5 March 2015
- President: Mohamad Morsi; Adly Mansour; Abdel Fattah el-Sisi
- Prime Minister: Hesham Qandil; Hazem Al Beblawi; Ibrahim Mahlab
- Preceded by: Mounir Fakhry Abdel Nour
- Succeeded by: Khaled Abbas Rami

Personal details
- Born: 1954 (age 71–72)
- Education: Ain Shams University

Hisham Zazou (Arabic: هشام زعزوع; born 1954) is an Egyptian businessman and politician who is the former Egyptian minister of tourism. He was one of the ministers who were not affiliated with an Islamist party in the Qandil cabinet. Zazou remained in his post in the interim government of Egypt, until he was replaced by Khaled Abbas Rami. He was reappointed on 19 September 2015.

== Early life and education ==
Zazou was born in 1954. He holds a Bachelor of Arts degree in commerce from Ain Shams University in 1980. Beside his Bachelor of Commerce in Accounting from the University of Ain Shams in Cairo, Zaazou earned a specialized Certificate in PPP. (Public Private Partnership) from Harvard Kennedy Business School, MBA & PhD from the international business from IBRA, Delaware, USA.

== Career ==
Zazou began his career in the City Bank Group for five years in Cairo. Then he helped to establish a tourist agency in the US focusing on the Egyptian market and began to work in the tourism field. From 2004 to 2007, Zazou served as the chair of the Egyptian Tourism Federation.

== Political career ==
During the Mubarak era, in 2009, Zazou served as the first deputy of the minister of tourism. After the Egyptian uprising, he served as senior assistant to former tourism minister Mounir Fakhry Abdel Nour. On 2 August 2012, Zazou began to serve as tourism minister in the cabinet of Hesham Qandil. Although Zazou submitted his resignation on 1 July 2013, it was announced by the state news agency MENA on 15 July that he would continue to serve as tourism minister in the cabinet of interim prime minister Hazem Al Beblawi. Zazou sworn in on 16 July.

=== Statement on tourism following attack in Sinai ===
Following a fatal attack in the Sinai Peninsula in August 2012, in which 16 Egyptian soldiers were killed by armed men who subsequently infiltrated into Israel and were killed by the Israel Air Force, Zazou denied that there was a negative impact on tourism following the attack, and said that tourism agencies did not cancel reservations and that he was personally calling them to make sure. Zazou stressed that tourists should feel secure in Egypt.

=== Resignations ===
In June 2013, Zazou submitted his resignation in protest at President Morsi's appointment of a member of the Construction and Development party as governor of Luxor – this party being associated with the Jama'a al-Islamiya group, which had killed 62 tourists and local tourism-industry workers in the 1997 Luxor Massacre. Zazou's resignation placed him at the head of a mass protest from all quarters of the Egyptian tourism industry, a main source of foreign currency that is vital to the country's economy. Prime Minister Hisham Qandil "refused the resignation and asked him to stay at his post to review the situation". A few days later the new governor resigned instead.

However, he and four other ministers resigned from office on 1 July due to government's reaction to mass demonstrations in the country. Then prime minister Qandil refused to accept Zazou's resignation, however, and asked him to remain in the post.
