= Renaissance Party (Egypt) =

Political party in Egypt

Renaissance Party حزب النهضة Hezb Al-Nahda
- Leader: Ibrahim Al-Zafaraany
- Founded: March 2011
- Ideology: Salafism
- House of Representatives: 0 / 568

The Egyptian Renaissance Party (Arabic: حزب النهضة, romanized: Hezb Al-Nahda), also known as the Revival Party, is a Salafist political party. However, it has also been reported to be in favor of a civil state.

== History ==
The party was founded by former members of the Muslim Brotherhood. The founder of the party is Mohammed Habib.

It allied with the Al-Wasat Party and the Pioneer Party during the 2011–12 Egyptian parliamentary election.

In the Qandil Cabinet, one minister was a member of the Renaissance Party. The party has stated in September 2012 that it and the Virtue Party would merge.

== Policy ==
The leader of the party, Ibrahim Al-Zafaraany, stated that the party would focus on education and "scientific research" as well as the economy. Al-Zafaraany is a former member of al-Gama'a al-Islamiyya.
