= Mohamed Kamel Amr =

Egyptian diplomat

- محمد کامل عمرو
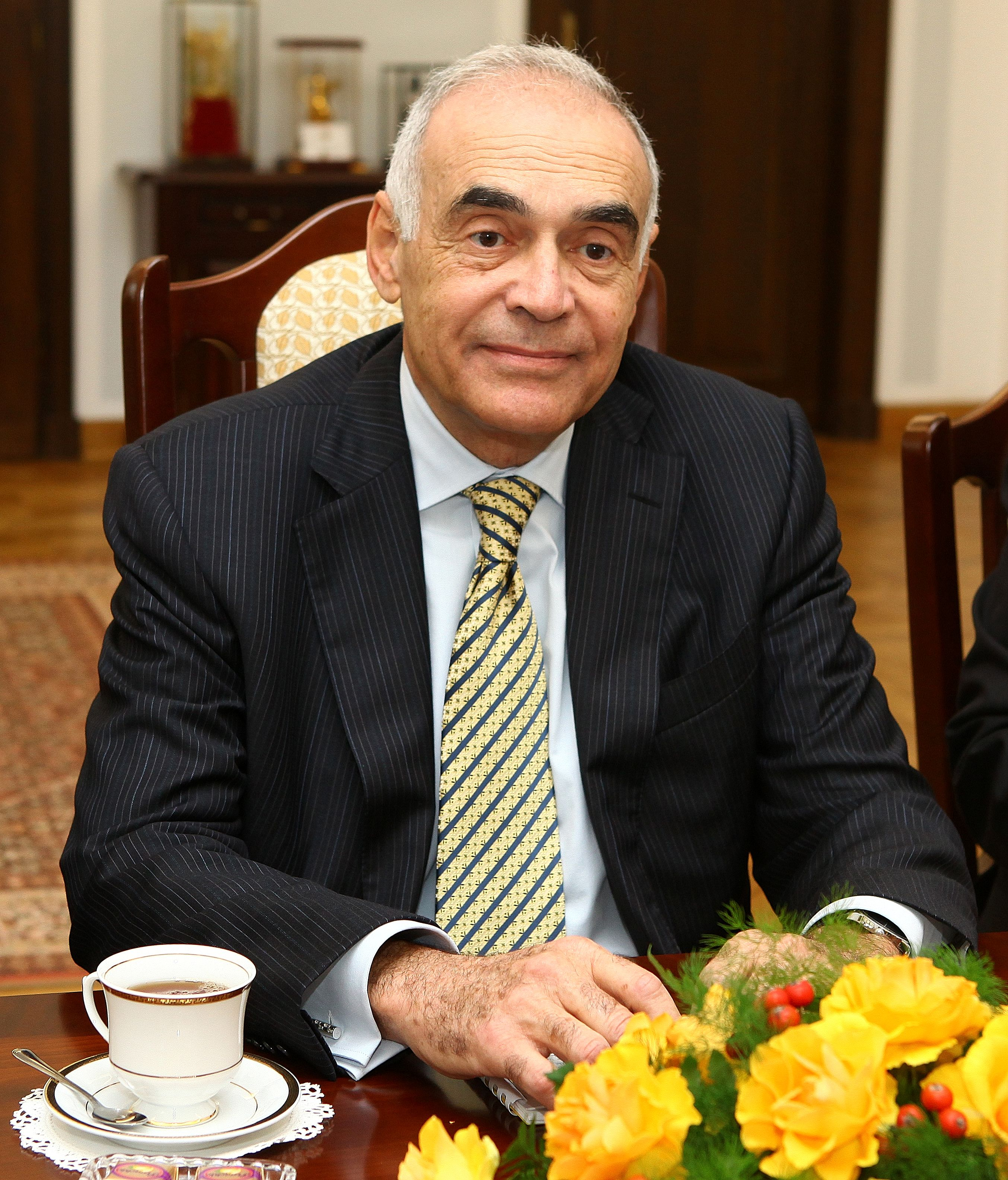
- Amr in 2011

Minister of Foreign Affairs
- In office 18 July 2011 – 16 July 2013
- President: Mohammed Morsi; Adly Mansour (acting)
- Prime Minister: Essam Sharaf; Kamal Ganzouri; Hesham Qandil
- Preceded by: Mohamed Orabi
- Succeeded by: Nabil Fahmy

Personal details
- Born: 1 December 1942 (age 83) Cairo, Kingdom of Egypt

Mohamed Kamel Amr (Arabic: محمد کامل عمرو; born 1 December 1942) is an Egyptian politician and diplomat who served as Egypt's Minister of Foreign Affairs between 2011 and 2013. He resigned from office on 30 June 2013.

== Early life ==
Amr was born on 1 December 1942 in Shobrareis, Beheira Governorate, a small village in the Nile Delta by the Rosetta branch of the river Nile, in a family of landowners. He graduated from Alexandria University in 1965 with a degree in Economics and Political Science.

After passing the foreign service exam, Amr joined the Egyptian foreign service in late 1967. Then, he spent two years training at the Foreign Ministry’s Diplomatic Institute in Cairo, Egypt.

== Career ==
Upon completing his foreign service training, Amr was assigned to the Office of the Egyptian Foreign Minister, Mahmoud Riad, as a diplomatic attache.

After three years with the Office of the Foreign Minister, Amr was posted to the Egyptian Embassy in Addis Abba, Ethiopia, as a Third Secretary. After spending one year in Ethiopia, Mr Amr was assigned to the Egyptian Embassy in London, England. Amr served under three different Ambassadors in London, including General Saad-Eldin El-Shazly, who was the Chief of Staff of the Egyptian Army during the 1973 October War.

Upon completion of his assignment in London, Amr returned to Cairo in 1976 as First Secretary working as an advisor to Mohamed Riad, Minister of State for Foreign Affairs.

Amr’s next assignment was to the Egyptian Embassy in Beijing, China as First Secretary in late 1977. His period in China coincided with the beginning of the transformation of the Chinese economy after the death of Mao Zedong and the rise of Deng Xiaoping. This assignment left a considerable impact on Amr as an example of a third world country’s ability to transform and modernize itself, eventually becoming the second largest economy in the world. From China, Amr was transferred to the Egyptian Embassy in Canberra, Australia, where he spent two years.

Returning to Cairo in late 1980, Amr was assigned as an advisor to Dr. Boutros Boutros-Ghali, then Minister of State for Foreign Affairs. Working closely with Dr. Ghali, Amr worked on various issues including Egyptian-American relations.

In 1982, Amr was assigned as a Counselor to the Egyptian Permanent Mission to the United Nations in New York, New York, where he working under Dr. Esmat Abd El-Meguid, the permanent representative at the time. During his tenure in New York, Amr was in charge of African affairs, including relations with the African Group in the United Nations and in such capacity was a member of the United Nations Council on Namibia, which was at the time under occupation by South Africa.

In 1983 while Amr was serving in New York, Egypt was elected as a non-permanent member of the United Nations Security Council, representing the North African countries. During this period, the United Nations Security Council established a select committee to investigate the attacks carried out by South Africa against Angola. Amr was chosen to head this committee and amongst his responsibilities was visiting Angola and reporting to the Security Council on the extent of damage sustained by these attacks. Based on his report, the Security Council adopted United Nations Security Council Resolution 567 (1985), condemning South Africa for its attacks on Angola and demanding South Africa’s unconditional withdrawal of its occupation forces from the territory of Angola and the immediate cessation of all acts of aggression against Angola.

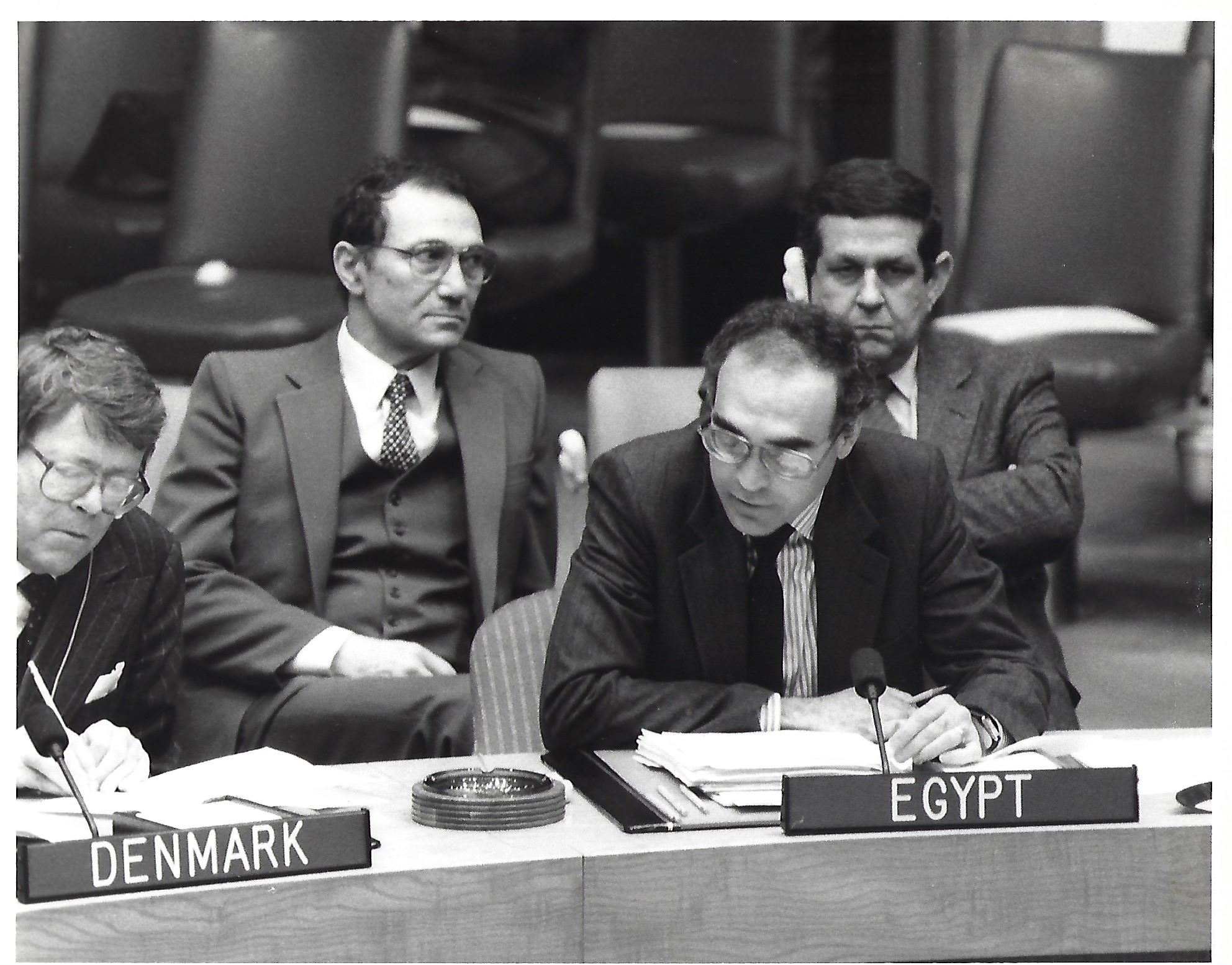
Amr presenting his report to the United Nations Security Council in 1984

Returning to Cairo in 1987, Amr was appointed as advisor to Dr. Ahmed Asmat Abdel-Meguid, who at the time was the Egyptian deputy prime minister and minister of foreign affairs. After two years in this capacity, Amr was appointed to the Egyptian embassy in Washington, D.C., as the political minister.

During his tenure in Washington, D.C., Amr was responsible for Egyptian-US relations, including US assistance to Egypt, relations with the US Senate, relations with US based think tanks, Jewish special interest groups and the US academic community. Amr was involved in the efforts that resulted in the forgiveness of United States military debt to Egypt.

In 1993, Amr returned to Cairo as assistant deputy foreign minister for African organizations. This period in time coincided with the end of the apartheid regime in South Africa and the release of Mr. Nelson Mandela from imprisonment. In his capacity as Assistant Deputy Foreign Minister for African Affairs, Amr was involved in the process of re-establishing relations between Egypt and the new regime South Africa.

In 1995, Amr was appointed as the Egyptian ambassador to Saudi Arabia. Amr was instrumental in working to strengthen relations between the two countries.

In 1997, Amr was chosen by the Egyptian Government to represent the Egypt and other Arab countries as a member of the Board of Executive Directors of the World Bank in Washington, D.C., where he remained in this capacity for 11 years.

Amr returned to Cairo in early 2009 assuming the position of executive director of the Center for Strategic Documentation of the Economic and Social transformation process in Egypt. Amr occupied this post until July 2010.

=== Ministerial activities and views ===
After the January 2011 revolution, Amr was appointed as the foreign minister of Egypt in July 2011. Amr’s two-year tenure as Foreign Minister of Egypt was widely seen as one of the most complex and tumultuous periods in Egyptian history. For the first year, Amr served under the Supreme Council of the Armed Services (SCAF) headed by Field Marshal Mohamed Hussein Tantawi. Following the Egyptian presidential elections of 2012, and at the behest of several Egyptian political figures who were worried about the direction of Egyptian foreign policy under an ideologically motivated government, Amr agreed to continue as Foreign Minister under newly elected President Mohamed Morsi.

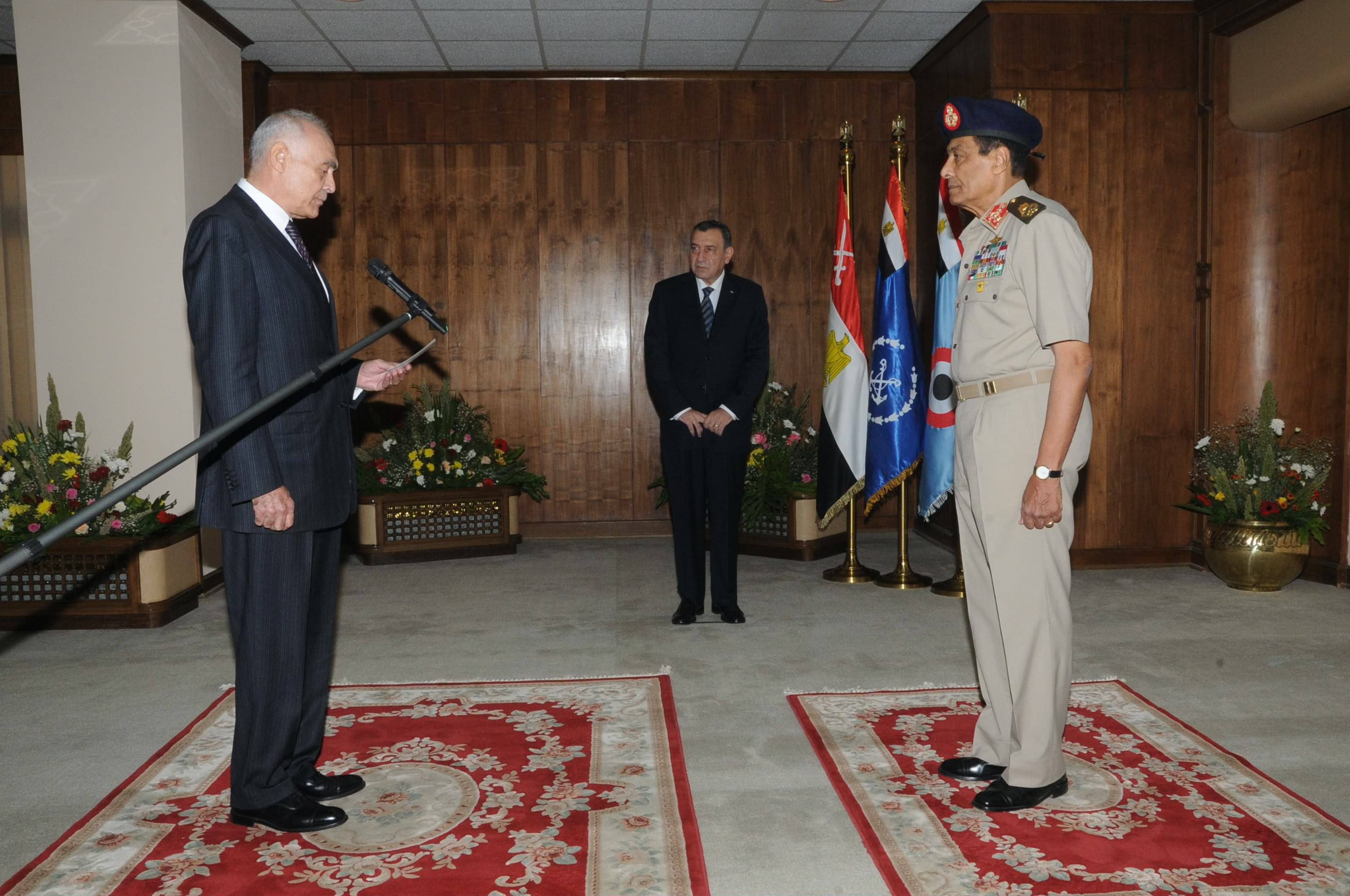
Amr being sworn in as foreign minister by Field Marshal Tantawi in July 2011

Amr was credited by many as being able to maintain the independence and integrity of the foreign ministry as an institution and apolitical body, impervious to any ideological influences. Amr sought to regain balance in Egypt's foreign relations through strengthening and renewing relationships with its historical partners.

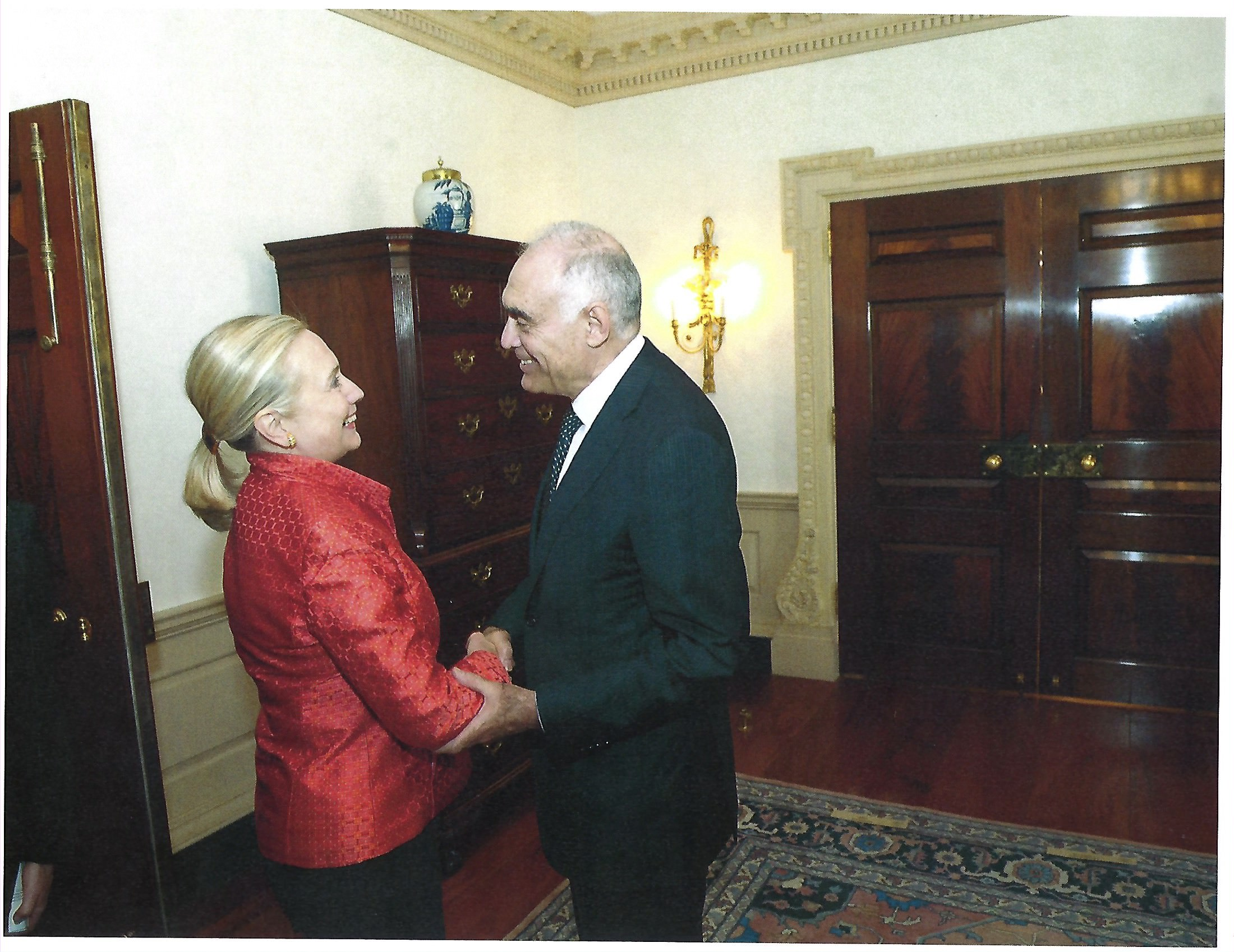
Amr meeting Secretary of State Hillary Clinton at the US State Department in September 2011

Amr resigned his post as foreign minister in late June 2013 due to the ongoing civil and political strife gripping the country. Amr continued in his post in a caretaker capacity until the formation of the new government on July 18, 2013, at which time he announced his retirement from government service.

== Personal life ==
In his spare time, Amr enjoys reading, particularly about technology advancements, world history and the history of naval advancement since the era of sails to the current time and technology. He is also a fan of British novelist John Le Carre. Amr also enjoys photography and listening to jazz and classical music.

Amr has been married to Hayam Hussein since 1969. Together they have two sons and two grandsons.

Political offices
Preceded by Mohamed Orabi	Foreign Minister of Egypt; 2011–2013	Succeeded by Nabil Fahmy
