= Al-Wasat Party =

Political party in Egypt

New Center Party حزب الوسط الجديد Hizb al-Wasat al-Jadid
- President: Mohamed Abdel Latif (acting); Abou Elela Mady
- Vice-President: Essam Sultan
- Vice-President: Mohamed Mahsoub
- Secretary-General: Mohammed Abdul-Latif
- Spokesperson: Amr Farouk
- Founded: 1996
- Legalized: 19 February 2011
- Split from: Muslim Brotherhood in Egypt
- Headquarters: 8 Pearl St., Mokattam, Cairo
- Membership (2011): 5.088
- Ideology: Islamic democracy
- Political position: Centre
- Colors: Maroon
- Slogan: الوطن قبل الوسط; Motherland before Al-wasat
- House of Representatives: 0 / 568

The al-Wasat Party (Arabic: حزب الوسط, romanized: Hizb al-Wasat), translated in English as the Center Party, is a moderate Islamist political party in Egypt.

== History ==
=== Foundation ===
The party was founded by Abou Elela Mady in 1996 as a split from the Muslim Brotherhood in Egypt, which Mady accused of having "narrow political horizons." The creation of al-Wasat was criticized by the Brotherhood, which said Mady was trying to split the movement. It was also not well received by the Egyptian government, which brought its founders before a military court on the charge of setting up a party as an Islamist front.

Al-Wasat tried to gain an official license four times between 1996 and 2009, but its application was rejected each time by the political parties committee, which was chaired by a leading member of the ruling National Democratic Party. Political parties formed on the basis of religion have been banned by the Egyptian constitution since an amendment to Article 5 was approved in 2007.

=== Recognition ===
Al-Wasat was granted official recognition on 19 February 2011 after a court in Cairo approved its establishment. The court's ruling was handed down in the wake of the Egyptian Revolution of 2011, and made al-Wasat the first new party to gain official status after the resignation of President Hosni Mubarak. Its newly acquired official status allowed al-Wasat to compete in the next parliamentary election, and made it the first legal party in Egypt with an Islamic background.

=== 2011/2012 parliamentary election ===
The party initially was part of the Democratic Alliance for Egypt, though it left in October 2011 and later allied with the Renaissance Party and the Pioneer Party, both of which were also offshoots of the Muslim Brotherhood, and won 10 seats.

=== Post-coup d'etat ===
The leader of the party, Abou Elela Mady, as well as deputy head Essam Sultan, were detained following the 2013 Egyptian coup d'état. Elela Mady was released in August 2015.

The party withdrew from the Anti-Coup Alliance on 28 August 2014. A court case was brought forth to dissolve the party, though the Alexandria Urgent Matters Court ruled on 26 November 2014 that it lacked jurisdiction.

== Ideology ==
According to the Carnegie Endowment for International Peace, al-Wasat "seeks to interpret Islamic sharia principles in a manner consistent with the values of a liberal democratic system. Although al-Wasat advocates a political system that is firmly anchored in Islamic law, it also views sharia principles as flexible and wholly compatible with the principles of pluralism and equal citizenship rights." The party's manifesto accepts the right of a Christian to become head of state in a Muslim-majority country. Its founder Mady likens its ideology to that of the Turkish Justice and Development Party (AKP).

== Electoral history ==
=== People's Assembly elections ===
Election	Seats	+/–
2011–12	10 / 596	▲10

== See also ==
- List of Islamic political parties
- List of political parties in Egypt
