= Egyptian Republican Guard =

Army unit defending the President and government

- قوات الحرس الجمهوري; El-Haras el-Gomhoury
- Active: 1955 – present
- Country: Egypt
- Role: Armoured
- Size: 24,000 active duty troops
- Part of: Egyptian Army
- Garrison/HQ: Heliopolis
- Engagements: Suez Crisis; Six-Day War; Yom Kippur War; 2012 Heliopolis Palace incident Republican Guard headquarters clashes

Commanders
- Current commander: Major General Tarek Nassar
- Notable commanders: Mohammed Hussein Tantawi; Magdi Hatata

The Egyptian Republican Guard (Arabic: قوات الحرس الجمهوري, romanized: Qūwāt El-Ḥaras el-Gomhoury) is a Division level command within the Egyptian Army, designed to be an armored division with the main responsibilities of defending the President of the Republic as well as the major presidential and strategic institutions, including the Presidential Palaces, Command centers, and presidential airports.

It is one of the largest Divisional commands in Egypt with a heavy emphasis on Armoured and Mechanized warfare. It is the most senior Corps in the Egyptian Army. The Republican Guard is the only division in the Egyptian Armed Forces that receives commands only from its commander and the president, rather than the Supreme Council of the Armed Forces led by the minister of defense.

== Location ==
The Republican Guard Division is the only significant military unit allowed in central Cairo.

The Republican Guard House, or the Republican Guard Club, is located on Salah Salem Street, next to the El Obour Buildings. It is a recreational club for Republican Guard officers and has a wedding hall used for weddings. It witnessed a sit-in outside its walls by supporters of the ousted President Mohamed Morsi in July 2013 due to their belief that he was being kept inside.

== History and present role ==
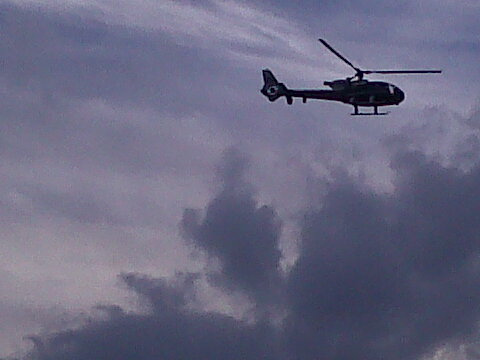
Republican Guard helicopter during the Egyptian Revolution of 2011

The Republican Guard was established in 1955, two years after the monarchy of Egypt and Sudan was toppled in the Egyptian Revolution of 1952 which led to the declaration of the Republic of Egypt. The office of President of Egypt being vacant from November 1954 to January 1956 following the forced resignation of Egypt's first President, Mohamed Naguib, it was Prime Minister (and eventual second President of Egypt) Gamal Abdel Nasser who ordered the creation of the Guard, issuing instructions to General Nasser Mohammad Laithi Nassif to oversee a dedicated military unit with responsibility for protecting the institutions of government in the capital, Cairo, especially the Presidency. One of its primary establishment by Nasser was to protect the President from coups by the military. Known originally as the National Guard, it was mainly a paramilitary force, but was expanded into a large military force, first at a brigade level in the 1950s and 1960s, and incorporated into the Egyptian Armored Corps in 1985. It was still the size of an armoured brigade in 1990, but was then augmented to division level,

Secondary duties are to protect presidential sites and important State buildings in Cairo (such as the Federal Palace, the Dome Palace, the Abdeen Palace and the Tahra Palace), to provide Honor Guard and security services for the highest national personalities and important foreign guests; and to respond to any rebellion, coup, or other threat to the government of the Republic.

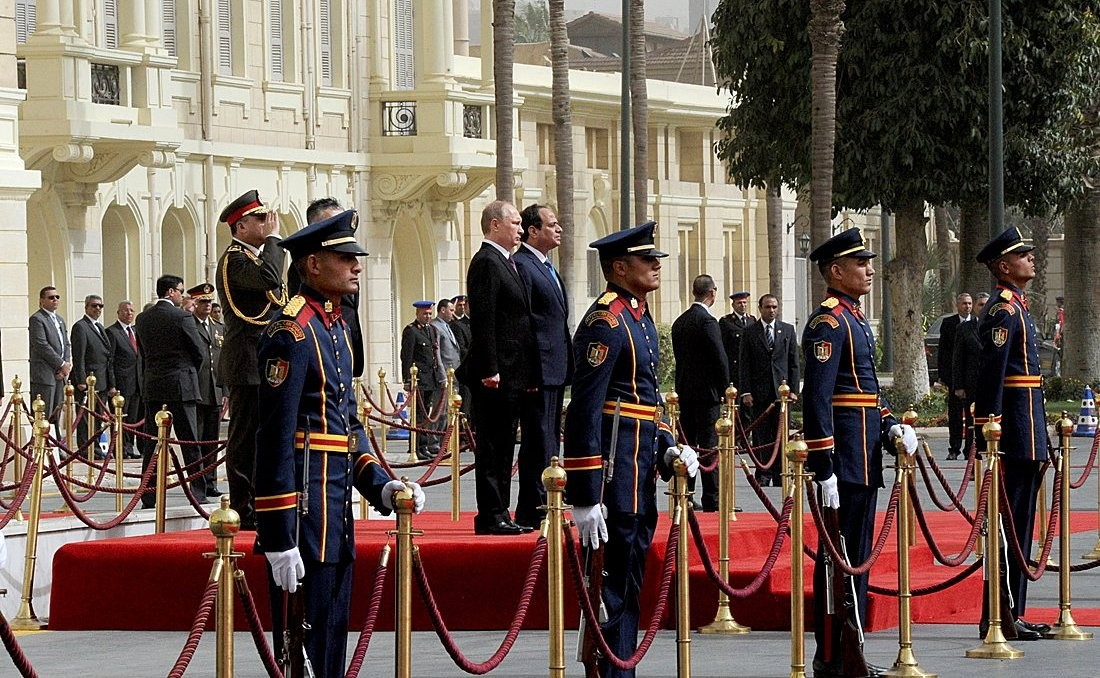
Egyptian Presidential Guard of Honor during the playing of the national anthem

Members are mainly but not exclusively volunteers on deputation from other Army units, mainly armored and mechanized units, who receive bonuses and subsidized housing, and received greater training than the regular army. The Egyptian Republican Guard, however, doesn't recruit directly from the population, unlike their Syrian, Yemeni, and (formerly) Iraqi counterparts. The bulk of its troops are recruited from other Army units, mainly on the basis of performance and advanced training in urban and other types of modern warfare.

Generally components of one or more Brigades of the Guard have been deployed to forward divisions on Egypt's eastern and western borders.

The Republican Guard is mainly equipped with M60 Patton and M1A1 Abrams tanks, Fahd 280, BMP-1 and AIFV armoured fighting vehicles. There are several anti-tank infantry platoons as well, equipped with the AT-13 Saxhorn and BGM-71 TOW anti-tank guided missiles. They were initially trained by the Soviet Army in the 1950s and 1960s.

The Military Police battalions of the Republican Guard have often been deployed as conventional Riot Police armed with teargas, water cannons and batons, especially during civil unrest targeting key Defence installations and buildings.

At dawn on July 8, 2013, a series of clashes erupted between Republican Guard soldiers and protesters who demanded the return of the former President Mohamed Morsi to power following the 2013 Egyptian coup d'état. This led to at least 61 deaths and 435 injuries.

== Leadership ==
The Republican Guard is under the direct command of the Ministry of Defense. Its current commander is General Mohamed Ahmed Zaki.

=== Commanders of the Republican Guard ===
- Staff Brigadier General Mustafa Shawkat (February 2020 – present)
- Staff General / Ahmed Ali (2017 - 2020)
- Lieutenant General Mohamed Ahmed Zaki (August 12, 2012 - TBC)
- Brigade / Naguib Abdel Salam
- Staff General / Sami Abu Al-Atta Diab
- Staff General / Muhammad Hani Metwally
- Staff General / Sabri Al-Adawi (December 2001)
- Staff General / Mahmoud Khalaf
- earlier commanders

== Structure ==
- HQ Republican Guard Armored Division (aka 1st Republican Guard Armored Division)
- Armored brigades
  - 2 Armored Brigades (33rd & 35th)
    - 4 Armored Battalions (118th, 119th, 120th, 121st)
    - 2 Mechanized Battalions (41st & 42nd)
- Mechanized Brigades
  - 2 Mechanized Brigades (510th & 512th)
    - 6 Mechanized Battalions (41st, 42nd, 43rd, 44th, 45th, 46th)
    - 2 Armored Battalions (116th & 117th)
- 1 S/P Artillery Brigade Command H.Q. (Brigade level)
  - 4 S/P Artillery Battalions (1st to 4th)
    - 16 S/P Artillery Batteries

== Uniform and Insignia ==
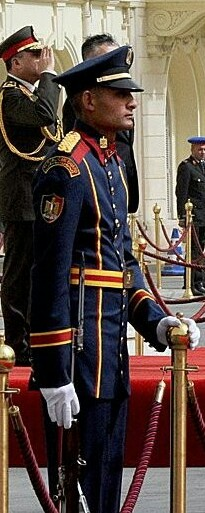
Ceremonial parade uniform.

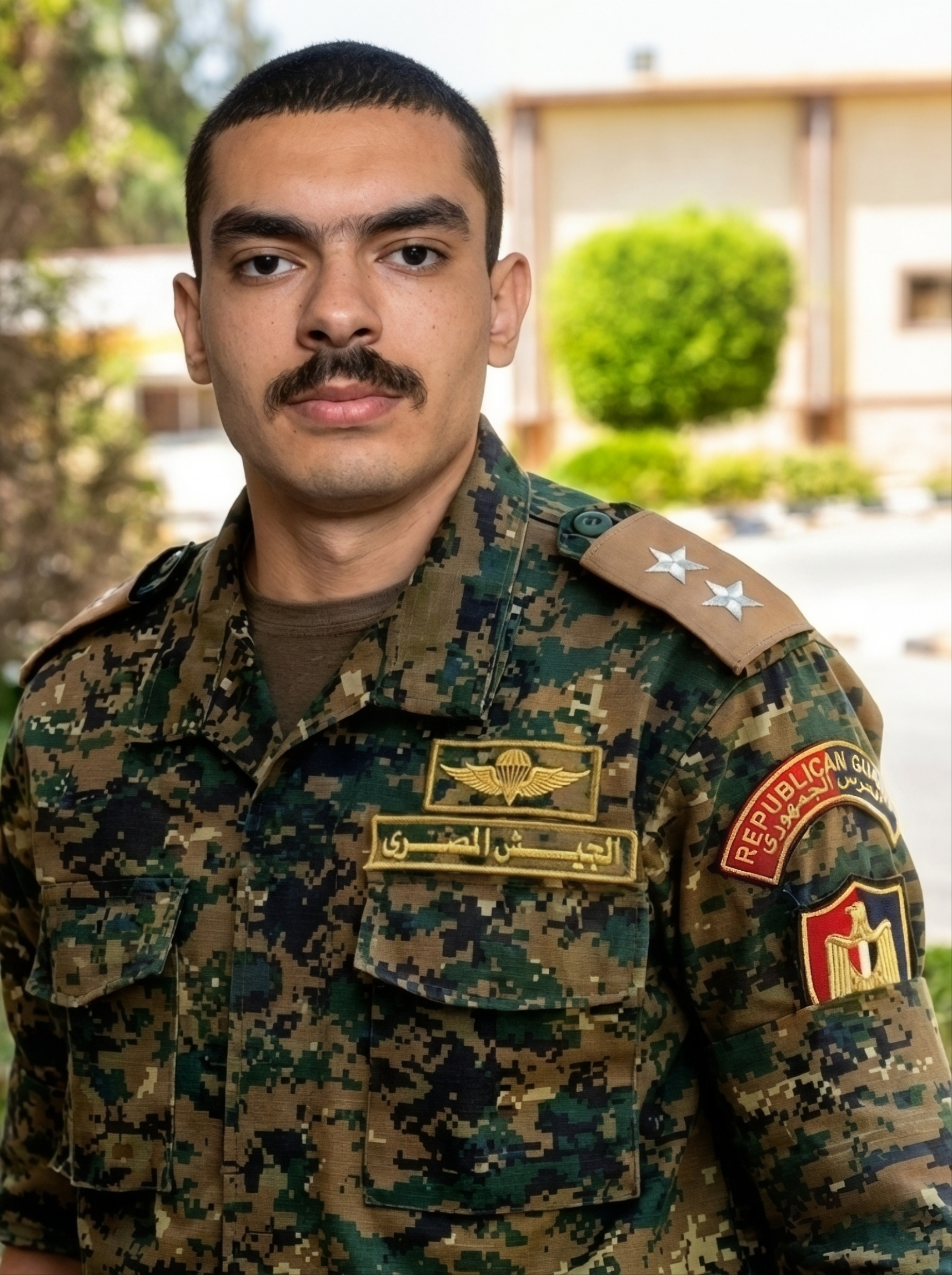
Digital Camo uniform

The Republican Guard has a distinctive uniform different from that of the regular Egyptian Army. The service uniform of the Guards is of a tan color with a distinctive blue beret and epaulets. A blue-grey parade uniform is worn by honor guard and other ceremonial detachments. The Military Police battalions wear a red beret, with a red colored helmet when deployed in riot control duties.

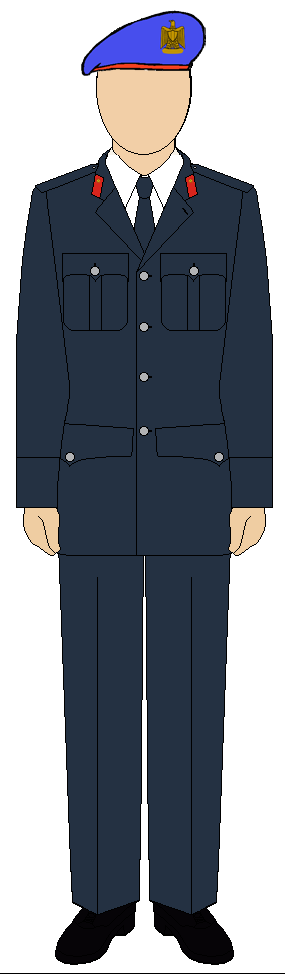
Everyday suit
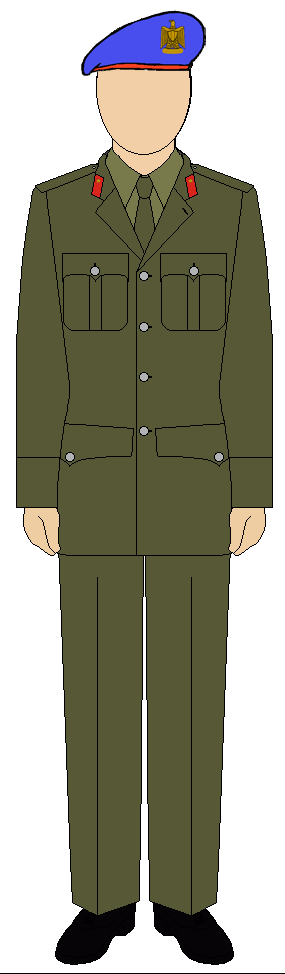
Republican Guard Police
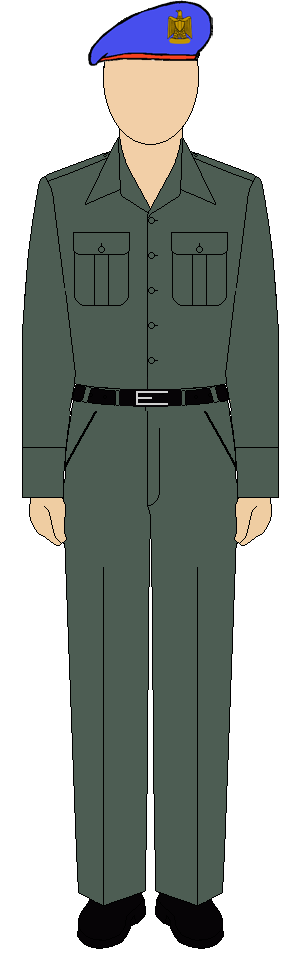
Field outfit
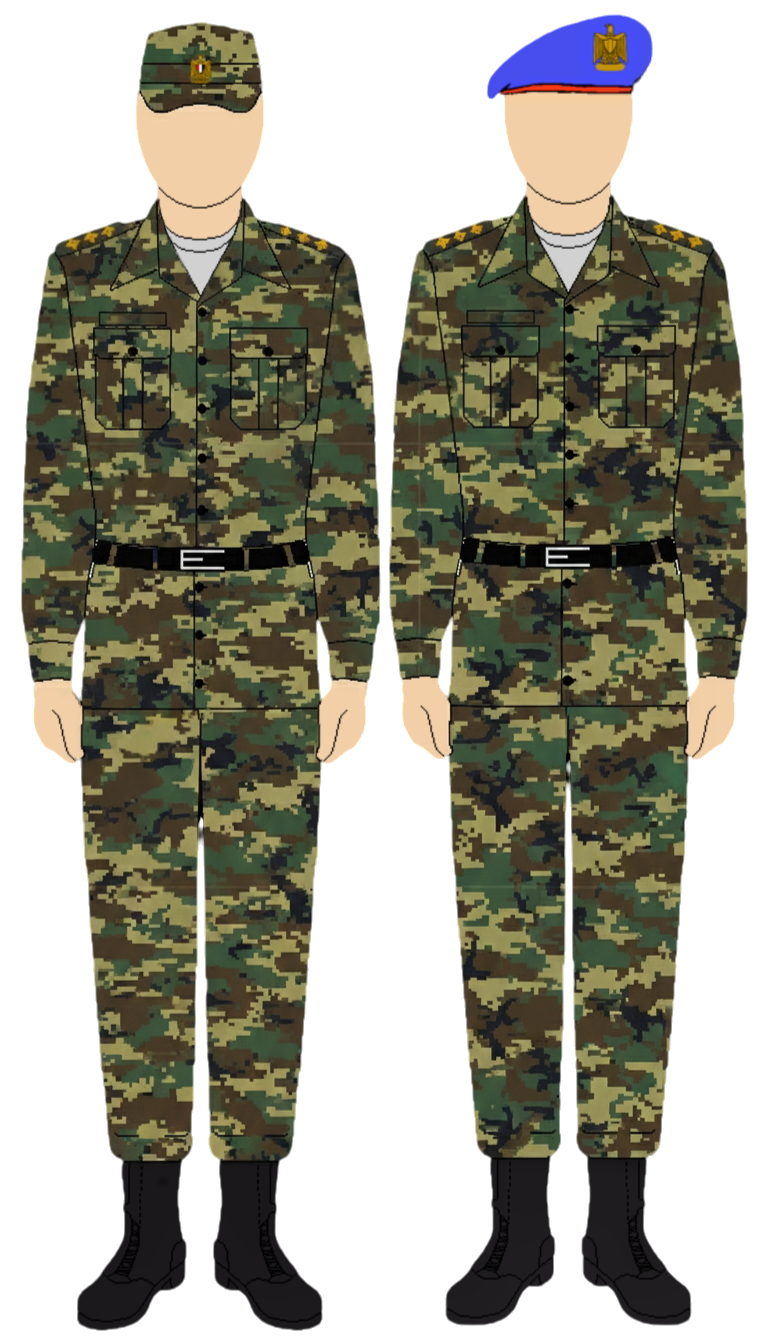
Camouflage outfit

Guard Police | Other Guard

=== Berets ===
Beret

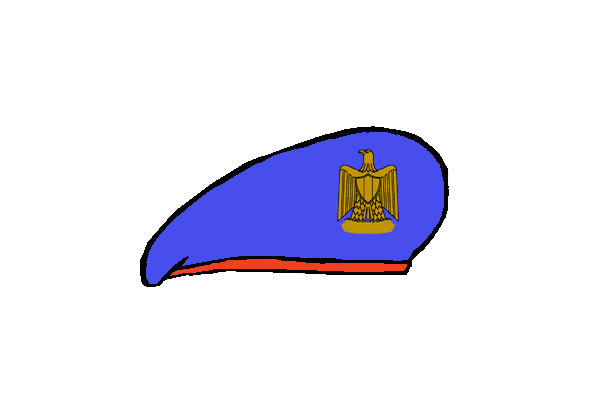
Officers

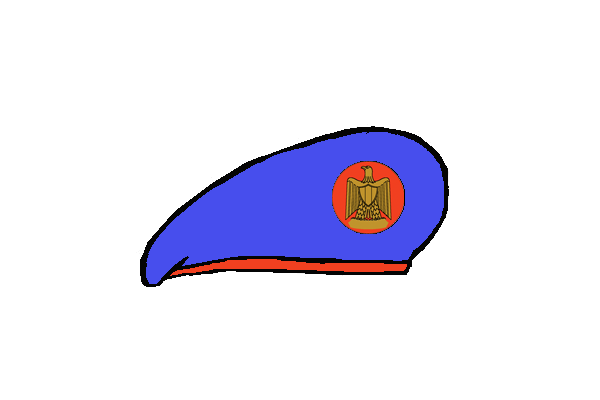
Brigadier General

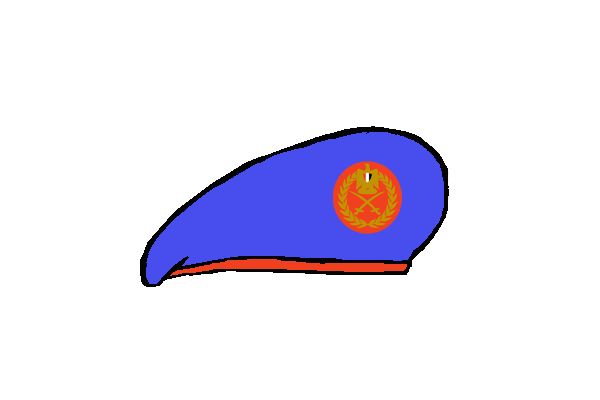
General

== See also ==
- Republican guard
- Central Security Forces
