= Freedom and Justice Party (Egypt) =

Political party in Egypt

Freedom and Justice Party حزب الحرية و العدالة
- Chairman: Saad El-Katatni
- Secretary General: Hussein Ibrahim
- Founded: 30 April 2011
- Banned: 9 August 2014 (continues to function underground)
- Headquarters: 20 King El-Salem Hameed Street Roda Island, Cairo
- Newspaper: Freedom and Justice
- Membership (2011): 8,821
- Ideology: Islamism; Mixed economy; Economic liberalism; Neoliberalism; Social justice
- Political position: Centre-right to right-wing
- Religion: Sunni Islam
- National affiliation: Muslim Brotherhood in Egypt
- International affiliation: Muslim Brotherhood
- Colours: Green; Blue
- Slogan: We hold good for Egypt (Arabic: نحمل الخير لمصر)

Website
- www.fj-p.com

The Freedom and Justice Party (FJP; Arabic: حزب الحرية والعدالة, romanized: Ḥizb al-Ḥurriyyah wa-l-ʿAdālah) is an Egyptian Islamist political party. The ex-president of the party, Mohamed Morsi, won the 2012 presidential election, and in the 2011 parliamentary election it won more seats than any other party. FJP is nominally independent, but has strong links to the Muslim Brotherhood of Egypt, the largest political group in Egypt. The party was banned and dissolved in 2014; however, it continues to function underground.

The 2011–12 Egyptian parliamentary election resulted in the FJP winning 47.2 percent of all seats in the country's lower house of parliament, with fellow Islamist parties al Nour and al Wasat winning 24.7 and 2 percent, respectively. Both the FJP and the Salafist Al Nour Party have since denied alleged intentions of political unification.

The FJP originally stated that it would not field a candidate for the 2012 Egyptian presidential election, but ultimately did so; Muslim Brotherhood leader Khairat el-Shater was the initial candidate, followed by Morsi after el-Shater was disqualified. The Muslim Brotherhood has been declared a terrorist group by the interim government, leaving the status of the FJP unclear. On 15 April 2014, the Alexandria Court for Urgent Matters banned current and former members of the Muslim Brotherhood from running in the parliamentary elections. On 9 August 2014, the Supreme Administrative Court ordered the dissolution of the Muslim Brotherhood's Freedom and Justice Party and the liquidation of its assets.

== History ==
The Muslim Brotherhood announced on 21 February 2011, in the aftermath of the 2011 Egyptian revolution, that it intended to found the Freedom and Justice Party, to be led by Saad El-Katatny.

The party was officially founded on 30 April 2011, and it was announced that it would contest up to half the seats in the upcoming parliamentary election. It gained official status on 6 June 2011. The Muslim Brotherhood's legislative body appointed Mohamed Morsi as president of the Freedom and Justice Party, Essam el-Erian as vice president, and Saad El-Katatny as secretary general. The three are former members of the Muslim Brotherhood "Guidance Office", or Maktab al-Irshad, the highest-level body of the Egyptian Muslim Brotherhood.

The party was expected to win "the vast majority" of the seats that it contested in the 2011 parliamentary election – i.e., just under half of the seats in parliament – as "no other party" had "anything close to the network of committed supporters" that it had. In addition, the MB worked with independent candidates promising them support. On 24 June 2012, FJP's presidential candidate, Morsi, was announced as the winner of the election with 51.73% of the vote. Almost immediately afterward, he resigned from the presidency of the Freedom and Justice Party.

On the party congress held on 19 October 2012, Katatni was elected president, el-Erian remained as vice president, and Hussein Ibrahim as the new secretary-general.

By late 2012, the Freedom and Justice Party was no longer part of the Democratic Alliance coalition. And as of early 2013, Egypt was said to have become "increasingly divided between two camps": that of President Morsi and "Islamist allies", and opposing them "moderate Muslims, Christians and liberals".

In December 2013 the Muslim Brotherhood was declared a terrorist group by the interim government, leaving the status of the FJP unclear; the FJP was formally banned by a court in August 2014.

In June 2017 Cairo Criminal Court decided to postpone the retrial of Mohammed Badi, leader of the Muslim Brotherhood, and his deputy Shater, and 10 others in the case of events "Guidance Bureau", to 10 next July meeting to attend the accused.

=== Qandil government (2012–2013) ===
After 30 June 2012, when Morsi was sworn in as fifth and first democratically elected president of Egypt, Freedom and Justice Party became the principal governmental party. In the cabinet of Prime Minister Hesham Qandil, sworn in on 2 August 2012, FJP became the largest party in the government, taking 5 ministers, including the ministry of Housing and Urban Development, ministry of higher education, Ministry of Manpower and Immigration, Ministry of Media and ministry of State for Youth. On 27 August 2012, Morsi named 21 advisers and aides that included three women and two Christians and a large number of Islamist-leaning figures and the new governors to the 27 regions of the country, all coming from FJP. On 5 January 2013, ten ministers were changed, leading to an increase in the number of those who are members of the FJP in the cabinet. More specifically, the number of the FJP members in the cabinet became eight after the reshuffle. This reshuffle included the following ministries; ministry of finance, ministry of interior, ministry of state for local development, ministry of legal and parliamentary affairs, ministry of electricity, ministry of civil aviation, ministry of transportation, ministry of state for environmental affairs, ministry of local development and supply, and ministry of communication. On 7 May 2013, nine ministers were also changed in the cabinet, increasing the number of the FJP members to 12 out of a total of 35. The ministries reshuffled were as follows: Justice, Parliamentary Affairs, Petroleum, Antiquities, Agriculture, Finance, Planning, and International Cooperation, Culture, and Investment. After Morsi's and FJP's impossibility to redress the economy, they started to lose popularity and were criticized. On 30 June 2013, massive demonstrations were held across Egypt calling for President Morsi's resignation from office. Concurrently with these anti-Morsi demonstrations, his supporters held demonstrations elsewhere in Cairo. On 3 July at 21:00 (GMT+2), Abdul Fatah al-Sisi announced a road map for the future, stating that Morsi was removed and that the head of the Constitutional Court had been appointed the Interim President of Egypt. Also, FJP ministers resigned or were deposed by the military. An Egyptian appeals court endorsed a verdict dismissing Qandil of his duties and sentencing him to one year in prison for not executing a court ruling. Ensuing protests in favor of Morsi were violently suppressed with the dispersal of pro-Morsi sit-ins on 14 August 2013, amid ongoing unrest.

== Lawsuit against Islamic parties ==
Though officially dissolved, the Freedom and Justice Party was one of the eleven Islamic parties targeted by a lawsuit in November 2014, when an organization named Popular Front for opposing the Brotherhoodization of Egypt sought to dissolve all political parties established "on a religious basis." The Alexandria Urgent Matters Court however ruled on 26 November 2014 that it lacked jurisdiction.

== Political platform ==
On launching the new party, the Muslim Brotherhood confirmed that it did not object to women or Copts serving in a ministerial post (cabinet), though it deems both "unsuitable" for the presidency. The group supports a mixed economy with social justice, but without "manipulation or monopoly". The party's political program would include tourism as a main source of national income.

The Freedom and Justice Party is based on Islamic law, "but will be acceptable to a wide segment of the population," said leading MB member Essam al Arian. The party's membership is open to all Egyptians who accept the terms of its program. The spokesperson for the party said that "when we talk about the slogans of the revolution – freedom, social justice, equality – all of these are in the Sharia (Islamic law)." There is a rivalry between the Freedom and Justice Party and the Salafis, who regard the Freedom and Justice Party as having 'watered down' its values.

In an interview with Al-Alam TV that aired on 22 August 2012, Ahmad Sabi', the Freedom and Justice Party's media advisor stated (as translated by MEMRI) that the 1979 Camp David Accords between Egypt and Israel were "a mark of shame upon the Egyptian people" and was "undermining Egypt's sovereignty" and "projects for the development of the Sinai." Sabi' also stated that the Accord "is an unjust and unfair agreement, which has isolated Egypt from its Arab and Islamic environments, and from the pan-Arab effort to liberate the land of Palestine and to support Palestinian resistance."

In the same interview, Sabi' stated:

In addition, carcinogenic pesticides were imported from the Zionist entity, and Egyptian agriculture was made available to the Zionist entity. This led to the destruction of various sectors in Egypt. Egypt now suffers from endemic diseases, such as various types of cancer, hepatitis and kidney infections. All these and other diseases are the results of the carcinogenic pesticides, which were brought here along with that agreement.

== Leaders ==
List of leaders of the Freedom and Justice Party.

Number	Person	In-office
1.	Mohamed Morsi	30 April 2011 – 24 June 2012
–	Essam el-Erian (acting)	24 June 2012 – 19 October 2012
2.	Saad El-Katatni	19 October 2012 – present

== Electoral history ==
=== People's Assembly elections ===
Election	Seats	+/–
2011–12 (as part of Democratic Alliance for Egypt)	213 / 596	▲213

=== Shura Council elections ===
Election	Seats	+/–
2012	105 / 270	▲105

== See also ==
- List of Islamic political parties
- List of political parties in Egypt
- 2011–12 Egyptian parliamentary election
- 2012 Egyptian presidential election
