= Kamal Ganzouri =

Prime Minister of Egypt (1996–1999; 2011–2012)

- كمال الجنزوري
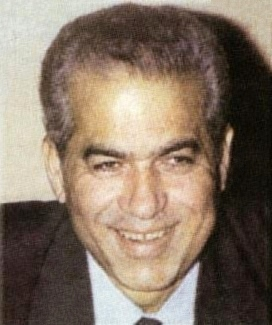
- Ganzouri in 1976

46th Prime Minister of Egypt
- In office 7 December 2011 – 30 June 2012
- President: Mohamed Hussein Tantawi (Acting)
- Preceded by: Essam Sharaf
- Succeeded by: Hesham Qandil
- In office 2 January 1996 – 5 October 1999
- President: Hosni Mubarak
- Preceded by: Atef Sedky
- Succeeded by: Atef Ebeid

Personal details
- Born: 12 January 1933 Monufia, Kingdom of Egypt
- Died: 31 March 2021 (aged 88) New Cairo, Egypt
- Party: National Democratic Party (Before 1999); Independent (1999–2021)
- Education: Michigan State University

Kamal Ganzouri (Arabic: كمال الجنزوري, romanized: Kamāl al-Ganzūrī, IPA: [kæˈmæːl elɡænˈzuːɾi]; 12 January 1933 – 31 March 2021) was an Egyptian economist who served as prime minister of Egypt from 2 January 1996 to 5 October 1999 and again from 7 December 2011 to 24 July 2012.

During his first term he was branded "Minister of the Poor" and "the Opposition Minister" because of his way of dealing with limited income people and the opposition. Before becoming prime minister, Ganzouri served as Minister of Planning and International Cooperation. On 24 November 2011, Ganzouri was appointed prime minister again by Egypt's military rulers.

== Early life and education ==
Kamal Ganzouri was born on 12 January 1933 in Garwan, a town in Bagor city in Monofia. He obtained a PhD at Michigan State University, United States and began teaching at Egyptian universities and training institutes in 1959.

== Political career ==
=== Early career ===
Ganzouri served as a board member of the Sadat Academy for Administrative Sciences from 1962 to 1967 and became economic adviser to the Arab Bank for Economic Development in Africa in 1968. He was an adviser to the President Anwar Sadat. He was also a member of the National Specialized Councils of production, education and services. In 1974, he became undersecretary of Planning Minister and kept this until 1975. He was appointed Governor of the New Valley State in 1976 and then became Governor of the Bani Suef State in 1977 but resigned after just six months.

=== Minister of Planning ===
He was appointed director of The National Planning Institute in 1977 after resigning from Governor of Bani Suef State. After Hosni Mubarak assumed power as President of Egypt in 1981, Ganzouri became Minister of Planning after one year in 1982. In June 1984, he became Minister of International Cooperation. He was also Deputy Prime Minister from November 1986 to January 1996.

=== First premiership ===
On 2 January 1996, Hosni Mubarak appointed Ganzouri as a replacement of Atef Sedki. His government (First Ganzouri Cabinet operated on a level that was unprecedented in Egypt's modern history: In about 4 years or less they declared 387 laws, 57 of those made dramatic changes to Egypt. He started his Prime Ministry with 4 major projects that were supposed to help move Egypt from the valley of the River Nile by developing and reclaiming new lands to live in away from the river Nile valley. His speciality in Planning enabled him to make a plan of development for Egypt up to 2017. He improved Egypt's relations with the International Bank through the International Monetary Fund by completing the only program ever completed between Egypt and the International Bank since 1961. 13 other programs had gone to nowhere back then. The poverty ratio was reduced from 21% to 17%. Many of his proposed projects were abandoned after he was dismissed as prime minister on 5 October 1999.

=== Life after first term as prime minister ===
Following his dismissal, he stayed completely away from the media. Some regime officials kept saying he didn't do any good to the country, and so his 20-year plan vanished while the 4 projects were neglected by the new government. Even though, he had a good reputation among the people of Egypt because of the major changes he had accomplished.

Ganzouri then appeared for the first time in about 11 years of silence as the Egyptian Revolution broke and right after Hosni Mubarak stepped down in a phone call on "Al Haya Al Youm" television program saying that's a day of a new era in Egypt and that there is no going back from this day.

He then reappeared in "Al Ashera Masa'a" TV program as his first dedicated interview after resurfacing. He started it with condolences to the protestors who died during the Egyptian Revolution, and stated that he was ready to be judged for whatever actions he took that damaged Egypt.

He was later interviewed on Almasry Alyoum where he was asked if he would nominate himself for the Presidency of Egypt, but declined to answer saying that would be the people's choice to make.

=== Possible presidential candidacy ===
Immediately following his appearance on television, pages and groups on Facebook emerged supporting him for presidency. They grouped up and had an official page for Media outreach. Involved parties therein expected to meet him and discuss his nomination. New Wafd Party sources were said to be thinking of backing him up as their own nominee. Nevertheless, he already had a big sector of people who supported him from the old days especially the limited income sector which is a big sector in Egypt's population. He mentioned nothing official after his last television appearance but he had some appearances in the press answering some corruption cases and investigations which were undertaken by his Cabinet that he did not approve of.

=== Second premiership ===
After Essam Sharaf resigned as Prime Minister of Egypt on 21 November 2011, the Supreme Council of the Armed Forces appointed Ganzouri to form a new coalition government on 24 November. He formed his "Salvation Government" (Second Ganzouri Cabinet) on 3 December 2011 and was sworn in on 7 December. The military leadership stated as the cabinet was being sworn in that it has transferred all presidential powers to him, with the exception of affairs related to the judiciary and the military. His government resigned on 25 June 2012 after the election of Mohamed Morsi as President of Egypt to make way for the new government.

=== Parliamentary list ===
Ganzouri began working on forming an electoral list, called the National Alliance, in September 2024, ahead of the 2015 Egyptian parliamentary election. He withdrew from the race on 4 February 2015.

== Personal life and death ==
Ganzouri was married and had three daughters (Suzanne, Magda and Mona).

Ganzouri died on 31 March 2021. He was 88.

Political offices
Preceded by Atef Sedki	Prime Minister of Egypt; 1996–1999	Succeeded by Atef Ebeid
Preceded by Essam Sharaf	Prime Minister of Egypt; 2011–2012	Succeeded by Hesham Qandil
