= Hazem El Beblawi =

Interim Prime Minister of Egypt from 2013 to 2014

- حازم الببلاوي
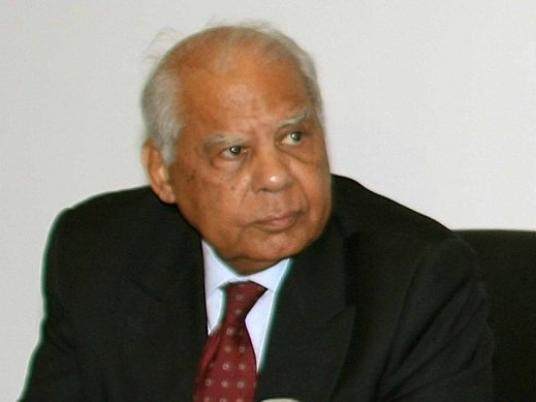
- Beblawi in 2012

Prime Minister of Egypt; Acting
- In office 9 July 2013 – 1 March 2014
- President: Adly Mansour (interim)
- Preceded by: Hesham Qandil
- Succeeded by: Ibrahim Mahlab (acting)

Deputy Prime Minister of Egypt
- In office 17 July 2011 – 1 December 2011
- Prime Minister: Essam Sharaf
- Preceded by: Samir Radwan
- Succeeded by: Momtaz El-Saeed

Minister of Finance
- In office 17 July 2011 – 1 December 2011
- Prime Minister: Essam Sharaf
- Preceded by: Samir Radwan
- Succeeded by: Momtaz El-Saeed

Personal details
- Born: Hazem Abdel Aziz El Beblawi; 17 October 1936 (age 90) Cairo, Kingdom of Egypt
- Party: Egyptian Social Democratic Party
- Education: Cairo University; University of Grenoble; Pantheon-Sorbonne University
- Website: Official website

Hazem El Beblawi (also spelled el Beblawy; Arabic: حازم عبد العزيز الببلاوي, romanized: Ḥāzim ʿAbd al-ʿAzīz al-Bablāwī, pronounced [ˈħæːzem ʕabd elʕaziːz elbebˈlæːwi]; born 17 October 1936), is an Egyptian economist and politician who was the interim prime minister of Egypt from 2013 until 1 March 2014. Previously he served as deputy prime minister and minister of finance in 2011. After the ouster of President Mohammed Morsi and his government in July 2013, Beblawi was named interim prime minister. On 24 February 2014, Beblawi announced his resignation.

== Early life and education ==
Beblawi was born in Cairo, Egypt, on 17 October 1936. He studied law at Cairo University and graduated in 1957. One of his teachers at Cairo University was Ismail Sabri Abdullah.

Beblawi obtained a postgraduate degree in economics from the University of Grenoble in France in 1961. He also holds a PhD in economics, which he received from the Pantheon-Sorbonne University in 1964.

== Career ==
Beblawi began his career as a lecturer at the University of Alexandria in 1965 and taught economy-related courses at several universities, including the University of Southern California, until 1980. He became a manager at the Industrial Bank of Kuwait in 1980, serving there until 1983. From 1983 to 1995, he was chairman and chief executive of the Export Development Bank in Egypt. He then worked at the United Nations Economic and Social Commission for Western Asia (ESCWA) as executive secretary from 1995 to 2000. Next, he served as an advisor to the Arab Monetary Fund in Abu Dhabi from 2001 to 2011.

After the January–February 2011 Egyptian revolution, Beblawi became a founding member of the Egyptian Social Democratic Party. He was appointed to the government as deputy prime minister for economic affairs, as well as minister of finance, in a cabinet reshuffle on 17 July 2011. He succeeded Samir Radwan, who had served as finance minister since January 2011. The cabinet was headed by Prime Minister Essam Sharaf.

After nearly four months in office, Beblawi resigned from office in October 2011 when Coptic Christians were killed by security forces. However, his resignation was not accepted by the ruling military council. Beblawi's tenure lasted until December 2011, when he was replaced by Momtaz Saeed as finance minister; Saeed had served as Beblawi's deputy at the Ministry of Finance.

Beblawi was one of the nominees for prime minister after the 2012 presidential election, together with Mohamed ElBaradei and Farouk El Okdah.

Following the removal of President Mohammad Morsi from office by the Egyptian military on 3 July 2013, Beblawi was appointed interim prime minister on 9 July. He subsequently suspended his membership in the Egyptian Social Democratic Party. His cabinet was sworn in on 16 July 2013.

On 24 February 2014, Prime Minister Beblawi announced the resignation of his cabinet in a press conference.

=== Activities and views ===
Beblawi defended the military's crackdown on Morsi supporters after the 2013 Egyptian coup d'état as necessary and restrained in August 2013. He proposed the legal dissolution of the Muslim Brotherhood on 17 August.

=== Works ===
Beblawi is the author of several books mostly about banking, finance, international trade and development. He also writes articles in a column for Al Ahram. His books include:

- Hazem Beblawi (2012). Arba Shohour Fi Qafas Al Hokouma (Four Months in the Government's Cage'). Cairo: Shrouk Publishing House.
- Hazem Beblawi; Giacomo Luciani (1987). The Rentier State. London: Croom Helm. ISBN 978-0709941446.
- Hazem Beblawi. (1984). The Arab Gulf Economy in a Turbulent Age. London: Croom Helm.

=== Awards ===
- Chevalier de la Légion d'honneur from France in 1992
- Commander, the order of Leopold II from Belgium in 1992
- Grand Officier, National Order of the Cedar from Lebanon in 2000

Political offices
Preceded by Samir Radwan	Minister of Finance; 2011	Succeeded by Momtaz El-Saeed
Preceded by Samir Radwan	Deputy Prime Minister of Egypt; 2011	Succeeded by Momtaz El-Saeed
Preceded by Hesham Qandil	Prime Minister of Egypt; Acting; 2013–2014	Succeeded by Ibrahim Mahlab; Acting
