= Hesham Qandil =

Prime Minister of Egypt from 2012 to 2013

- هشام قنديل
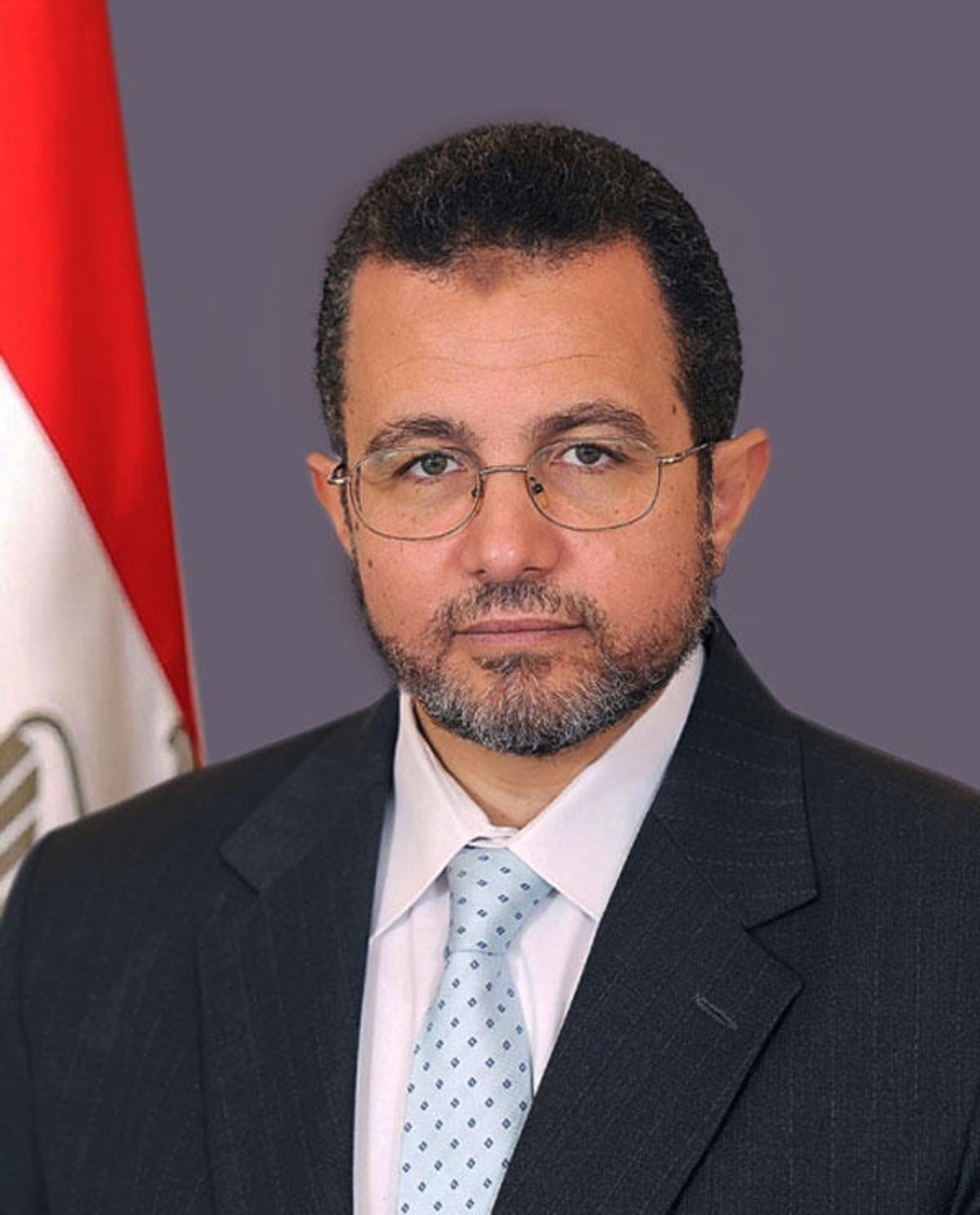
- Official portrait, 2012

51st Prime Minister of Egypt
- In office 2 August 2012 – 8 July 2013
- President: Mohamed Morsi
- Deputy: Mohamed Kamel Amr
- Preceded by: Kamal Ganzouri
- Succeeded by: Hazem El Beblawi (Acting)

Minister of Water Resources and Irrigation
- In office 21 July 2011 – 2 August 2012
- Prime Minister: Essam Sharaf; Kamal Ganzouri
- Preceded by: Hussien Ehsan Al-Atfy
- Succeeded by: Mohamed Bahaa Eldin

Personal details
- Born: Hesham Mohamed Qandil; 17 September 1962 (age 64) Beni Suef, United Arab Republic (present-day Egypt)
- Party: Independent
- Education: Cairo University (BS); Utah State University (MS); North Carolina State University (PhD)

Hesham Mohamed Qandil (also spelled: Hisham Kandil; Arabic: هشام محمد قنديل pronounced [heˈʃæːm mæˈħæmmæd ʔænˈdiːl]; born 17 September 1962) is an Egyptian engineer and civil servant who served as the 51st prime minister of Egypt from 2012 to 2013. Qandil was appointed as prime minister by President Mohamed Morsi on 24 July 2012 and sworn in on 2 August 2012. Qandil previously served as Minister of Water Resources and Irrigation from 2011 to 2012.

Reuters reported that Qandil was a politically independent senior public servant in the Morsi administration, but was not popularly considered to be a likely candidate for the position of prime minister. Qandil was Egypt's youngest prime minister since Gamal Abdel Nasser's appointment in 1954. When Morsi was overthrown in a coup d'état by the military, Qandil after initially continuing in his role as prime minister until the formation of a new government, resigned from office on 8 July 2013 in protest over the killing of 61 protestors by the military at the Republican Guard headquarters. He was arrested on 24 December 2013 and released seven months later on 15 July 2014 after he was acquitted by the Court of Cassation, which accepted his appeal and annulled the one-year sentence against him.

== Early life and education ==
Qandil was born in 1962. He holds a bachelor's degree in engineering, which he obtained from Cairo University in 1984. Then he received a master's degree in irrigation and drainage engineering from Utah State University in 1988 and a PhD in biological and agricultural engineering with a minor in water resources from North Carolina State University in 1993.

== Career ==
After graduation, Qandil joined the Egyptian civil service in the water resources department in 1985. He was granted a presidential award in 1995 for services to irrigation, and was promoted to office director for the minister of water resources from 1999 to 2005. He participated in the work of the Nile Basin Initiative, was an observer member of the Joint Egyptian-Sudanese Water Authority, and helped launch the African Water Council. He was also Chief of Water Resources at the African Development Bank, a position he held for approximately six years, from 2004 to early 2011. He returned to Egypt following the revolution to help rebuild the country. In 2011, he was appointed Minister of Water Resources and Irrigation as part of Prime Minister Essam Sharaf's second cabinet.

== Prime Minister of Egypt ==
On 24 July 2012, Qandil was appointed as prime minister by President Mohamed Morsi. His appointment was seen as unexpected by the Arab media, including The Majalla. On 2 August 2012, the newly formed Egyptian cabinet was sworn in consisting of a technocrat-dominated government, with a few political parties (the Freedom and Justice Party, the Al-Wasat Party, and the Renaissance Party).

=== First Qandil Cabinet ===
Qandil's first cabinet consisted of 35 ministers, including technocrats, the Freedom and Justice Party members, the Al-Wasat Party members, and the Renaissance Party members.

=== Second Qandil Cabinet ===
On 6 January 2013, ten ministers in the first cabinet of Qandil were changed. The reshuffle included ministry of finance, ministry of local development, ministry of transportation, ministry of legal affairs and parliamentary councils, ministry of electricity, ministry of interior, ministry of supply and social affairs, ministry of environment, ministry of communications and ministry of civil aviation. Following the reshuffle, the number of the ministers who were the members of the Freedom and Justice Party increased to eight in the cabinet.

=== Cabinet Resignations ===
On 1 July 2013, five cabinet members resigned together; they were Hisham Zazou, the tourism minister, Atef Helmi, the communications and IT minister, Hatem Bagato, the state minister for legal and parliamentary affairs, Abdel Qawi Khalifa, the irrigation minister, and Khaled Abdel Aal, the environment minister. Mohamed Kamel Amr, the foreign minister, resigned as well. The sports minister, El Amry Farouk, resigned on 2 July 2013.

=== Resignation ===
On 3 July 2013, an Egyptian appeals court upheld a verdict dismissing Qandil of his duties and sentenced him to one year in prison for not executing a court ruling to re-nationalize the Tanta Flax and Oil Company. Subsequently, on the same day, Morsi was removed from office in a coup d'état by the military. On 8 July 2013, Prime Minister Qandil resigned over the killing of 61 protestors by the military at the Republican Guard headquarters. He had initially decided to remain in his position as a caretaker PM until the formation of a new government. In late September 2013, the Cairo Misdemeanor Court upheld the sentence against Qandil and he was arrested on 24 December 2013. On 13 July 2014, the Court of Cassation accepted Qandil's appeal and abolished the verdict to imprison him for a year, to remove him from his job and to fine him 2,000 Egyptian pounds ($285). He was subsequently released on 15 July 2014.

== Personal life ==
Qandil is married and has five daughters.

Political offices
Preceded by Hussien Ehsan Al-Atfy	Minister of Water Resources and Irrigation; 2011–2012	Succeeded by Mohamed Bahaa Eldin
Preceded by Kamal Ganzouri	Prime Minister of Egypt; 2012–2013	Succeeded by Hazem El Beblawi; Acting
