= 2012–2013 Egyptian protests =

Period of unrest around the 2012 presidential elections and 2013 coup

- Part of the Egyptian Crisis
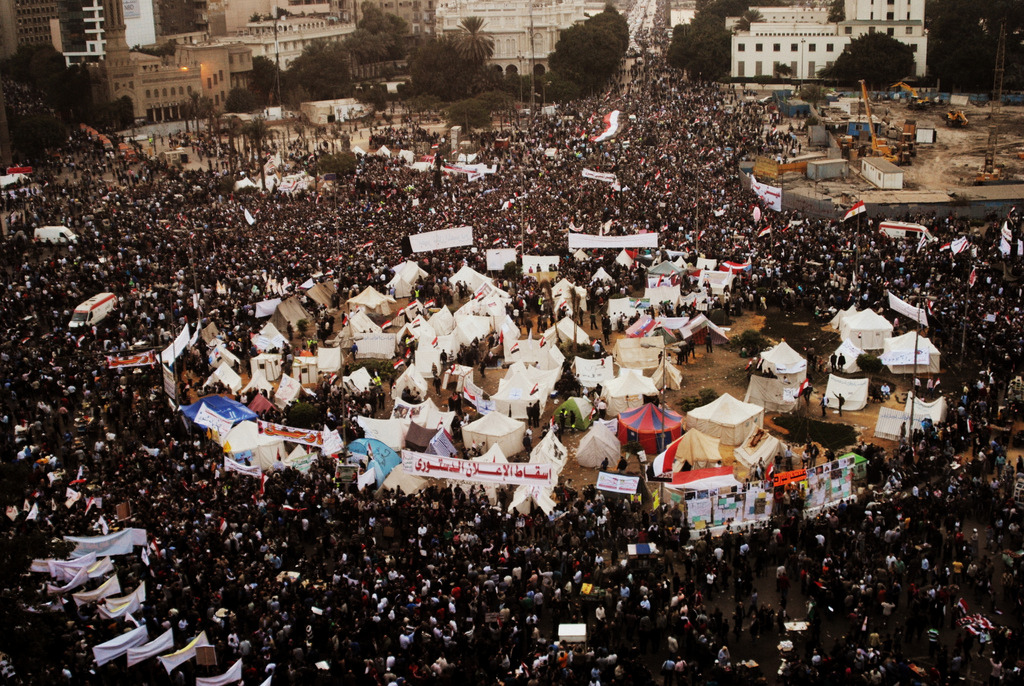
- Demonstrators in Cairo's Tahrir Square on the morning of 27 November 2012
- Date: 2 February 2012 – 3 July 2013
- Location: Egypt; 30°2′N 31°13′E
- Caused by: Perceived totalitarianism and nepotism; Mass death sentences for Port Said Stadium riot
- Goals: Withdrawal of Morsi's decree; Cancellation of referendum on draft constitution; Overhaul of the Islamist-dominated constitutional assembly; Ousting of President Mohamed Morsi; Overthrow of the Qandil Cabinet
- Methods: Civil disobedience; Civil resistance; Demonstrations; Strike actions; Online activism; Black Bloc; Riots
- Result: Mohamed Morsi overthrown on 30 June 2013; Pro-Muslim Brotherhood media experiences a downfall in Egypt; Constitution temporarily suspended for amendments, until a constitutional referendum is held; the Egyptian Constitution of 2014 is now the current constitution; Adly Mansour becomes interim president; new presidential election held in 2014; Continued protests, mainly pro-Brotherhood

Parties
Opposition: National Salvation Front; Kifaya; Tamarod; Al-Wafd; Judges' Club; Liberals; Leftists; Secularists; Anarchists (Black Bloc); Feminists; Artists and intellectuals; Anti-Sexual Harassment activists; Supported by: Egyptian Armed Forces	(Egypt) Government Supported by: Muslim Brotherhood: FJP; Building and Development Party)

Lead figures
Hosni Mubarak (Former President of Egypt); Abdel Fatah al-Sisi (Minister of Defense, Commander-in-Chief); Mohamed ElBaradei (leader of The Egyptian Salvation Front); Hamdeen Sabahi (leader of the Egyptian Popular Current); Amr Moussa (leader of Conference Party); Mohamed Abou El-Ghar (leader of the Egyptian Social Democratic Party); Ahmed el-Tayeb (Grand Imam of Al Azhar); Pope Tawadros II of Alexandria (Pope of the Coptic Orthodox Church of Alexandria)	Mohamed Morsi (President of Egypt); Hesham Qandil (Prime Minister of Egypt); Mohammed Badie (Supreme Guide of the Muslim Brotherhood); Khairat el-Shater (Deputy Chairman of the Muslim Brotherhood)

Casualties and losses
- 28 killed (17–22 November 2012); 59–60+ killed (25 January–3 February 2013); 40 killed (23 June–3 July 2013)

The 2012–2013 Egyptian protests (sometimes called the Hirak Uprising) were part of the crisis in Egypt including the June 2013 protests, the July 2013 coup d'état, and part of the post-coup unrest. They saw varying opposition against three contiguous heads of state; namely, the Supreme Council of the Armed Forces (SCAF), Muslim Brotherhood, and the de facto ruling Egyptian Armed Forces.

Beginning with the anniversary of the 2011 Egyptian revolution, small-scale protests took place in January demanding the military to step away from power. Those protests saw at least 7 protesters killed. Increasing violence, however, began in February 2012 with the massacre of Port Said, where 74 people (72 of which being Al-Ahly fans) were killed and hundred were injured by purported fans who were armed with knives, batons and swords, while the sparse security present stood idly. The lack of police intervention and alleged political involvement sparked a number of protests. Subsequent protests in March saw 1 killed after demands for the return of football matches for El Masry after the riots last month.

Mass demonstrations in April demanding a transfer of power were attacked by the military. In June, riots and violent demonstrations against the delay of the trial of those responsible for the killings of protesters since 2011 took place and demands for the parliament to be dissolved was heard. From 16 June – 30 July, strikes and major protests against the continued lack of freedom of speech and the apparent power grab by the SCAF. Workers protested in major strikes in July against unemployment and the economic situation. Protests against the film discriminating Islam took place from 11 to 14 September. It was suppressed. Doctors and nurses protested in October for weeks demanding better wages. Protests against the resignations of members of the armed forces in August were carried out by supporters of the military.

During Morsi's presidency, the demonstrations were organized by Egyptian opposition organizations and individuals, mainly liberals, leftists, secularists and Christians. They resulted in violent clashes between pro- and anti-Morsi protesters, with dozens of deaths and hundreds of injuries. Demonstrators gathered outside the Heliopolis Palace, which in turn was surrounded by tanks and armored vehicles of the Republican Guard. The anti-Morsi protesters in Cairo were estimated at 200,000, while over 100,000 supporters of Morsi gathered in Cairo to show support.

A number of Morsi's advisers resigned in protest, and many judges spoke out against his actions as well. Resignations were tendered by the director of state broadcasting, Rafik Habib (Christian vice president of the Muslim Brotherhood's Freedom and Justice Party), and Zaghloul el-Balshi (general secretary of the commission overseeing the planned constitutional referendum). Seven members of Morsi's 17-member advisory panel resigned in December 2012.

On 8 December 2012, Morsi annulled his temporary decree which had expanded his presidential authority and removed judicial review of his decrees, an Islamist official said, but added that the results of the temporary declaration would still stand.

On 22 December, the Constitution supported by Morsi was approved in a national referendum by 64% of the voters, with 33% of the electorate voting. The opposition claimed fraud in the process and called for an inquiry.

On 30 June 2013, prior to the anti-government protests, Morsi supporters gathered in Rabaa el-Adaweya square to celebrate the one-year anniversary of Morsi's inauguration. In turn, tens of thousands of Morsi opponents massed in Tahrir Square and outside the Heliopolis Palace demanding Morsi's resignation and pre-term presidential elections. Demonstrations were also reported in 18 locations across Cairo and in other different locations across the country including Alexandria, El-Mahalla and cities in the Suez Canal region. Various political organizations supported the demonstrations, including the Tamarod movement formed by members of the Egyptian Movement for Change, which claimed to have collected 22 million signatures calling for Morsi's resignation.

On 3 July 2013, the Egyptian Armed Forces released a statement announcing the end of Morsi's presidency, following a 48-hour deadline demanding that Morsi "responds to the demands of the people." In the same statement, the military announced the constitution was suspended for amendments and that new elections would be held at a future date. The chief justice of the constitutional court, Adly Mansour, became head of a transitional government.

Protesting Morsi's overthrow, his supporters staged large demonstrations in the Nasr City district of Cairo, and in Alexandria, Luxor, Damanhour, and Suez. In the aftermath, massacres were perpetrated during clashes between Morsi supporters and Egyptian soldiers and security forces, including the Rabaa massacre and the Republican Guard clashes. In many cases, the Armed Forces denied shooting at demonstrators with live ammunition, contrary to claims by the Brotherhood, its supporters, and several Western media outlets.

== Background ==
On 22 November 2012, Morsi issued a constitutional declaration purporting to protect the Constituent Assembly of Egypt from judicial interference. The declaration stated that it only applied until a new constitution was ratified. The declaration also required new trials for people acquitted of Mubarak-era killings of protesters, and extended the mandate of the constituent assembly by two months. Additionally, the declaration authorized Morsi to take all measures necessary to these ends.

In effect, the declaration made all constitutional declarations, laws and decrees made since Morsi assumed power immune to appeal by any individual, political or governmental body. Demonstrations both in support of and opposing Morsi broke out around Egypt after the declaration was made.

== Timeline ==
=== February 2012 ===
On 1 February 73 people were killed at a football game, in a stadium in Port Said. The riots began when fans of the team El Masry invaded the stadium, some of them carrying knives, and attacked fans of the rival team, Al Ahly. Initial media reports stated that more than 70 people were killed, with the death toll rising.

Numerous protests then took place, following this event. On Thursday, 2 February, protesters took to the streets of Cairo, enraged by the fact that the lax security had failed in preventing this tragedy from happening. Some of the protesters were heard chanting that Tantawi should be executed. The police then deployed tear gas, on the protesters.

=== March 2012 ===
On 24 March, numerous protesters took to the streets, angry that the football team El-Masry was banned for two more seasons, following the riots last month. The army then attacked the protesters. At least one person was killed, and at least 18 others were injured.

=== April 2012 ===
On 20 April, hundreds, possibly thousands, of protesters re-assembled in Cairo's Tahrir Square, demanding that the country's military rulers transfer power to a civilian government, sooner. They also wanted the Field Marshal, and leader of Egypt's military, Mohamed Hussein Tantawi, to step down.

On 14 April, several candidates in the upcoming presidential election were disqualified, for various reasons.

=== May ===
On 23–24 May, the first round of voting in the presidential elections took place. Many people went to the polls, to vote. The two candidates with the highest number of votes were the Muslim Brotherhood's replacement candidate, Mohamed Morsi, and Hosni Mubarak's last Prime Minister, Ahmed Shafik.

On 31 May, the decades-old State of Emergency was finally completely lifted, in Egypt.

=== June ===
On 2 June, former Egyptian President Hosni Mubarak was sentenced to life in prison, for complicity in the killings of protesters by police, during the revolution that eventually toppled him, in 2011. However, the judge also found him not guilty, on corruption charges. This, and the fact that he had not received the death penalty, led numerous protesters to immediately take to the streets, directly after the verdict was announced. On 14 June, Egypt's Constitutional Court ruled that a law preventing members of Hosni Mubarak's former government from running for President was unconstitutional, therefore letting Ahmed Shafik remain in the presidential race. The court also ruled that the mainly Islamist-led Parliament, should be dissolved. Both of these verdicts also led to protests, as well.

On 16–17 June, the second round of voting in the presidential elections took place. Both candidates claimed that they had won the election, and each accused the other of cheating. The results of the presidential election were initially going to be officially announced, on Thursday, 21 June. However, this date was later postponed.

On 18 June, the Muslim Brotherhood announced that its candidate, Morsi, had won the election. On the same day, the ruling military junta, (which is scheduled to transfer power to the newly elected President on 30 June), made a statement, in which they severely restricted the powers, of the Presidency. This led to huge protests in Tahrir Square, the biggest since those that eventually ousted Mubarak, more than a year earlier. Many of the protesters were members of the Muslim Brotherhood. On 19 June, the protests continued. Protesters rallied in Tahrir Square in Cairo, accusing the SCAF of planning a coup, and demanding that it back down.

The results of the presidential election were officially announced on 24 June 2012. It was announced that Morsi had narrowly beat Shafik, gaining 52% of the votes, while Shafik got 48% of them. Right after the announcement, Morsi supporters in Tahrir Square celebrated their victory. It has also been noted that this is the first time since Hosni Mubarak's resignation, on 11 February 2011, that celebrations of this magnitude have occurred, in Egypt. However, even after the results of the presidential election were announced, numerous protesters still remained, in Tahrir Square. They were protesting the apparent power grab by the Supreme Council of the Armed Forces.

On 30 June 2012, Morsi was sworn in as the fifth President of Egypt. This marked the first time in Egypt's history that a civilian president has been elected by the people. In the past, all of the other presidents were either from the military or had a military background.

The inauguration of Morsi led to the third wave of the revolution.

=== July 2012 ===
On 8 July, Mohamed Morsi issued a decree calling back into session the dissolved parliament for 10 July 2012. Morsi's decree also called for new parliamentary elections to be held within 60 days of the adoption of a new constitution for the country, which was tentatively expected for late 2012. A constitutional assembly selected by the erstwhile parliament had been formed and had begun the work of drafting the constitution. The Supreme Council of the Armed Forces (SCAF) held an emergency meeting in response to the decree, but adjourned the meeting without making an announcement.

On 9 July, Egyptian President Mohammed Morsi's order to reconvene parliament was rejected by Egypt's Supreme Constitutional Court which said after meeting on 9 July 2012 that all its rulings and decisions, including its judgement that part of the election for parliament was unconstitutional and which led in return to the assembly's dissolution by the SCAF, are final, not subject to appeal and binding for all state institutions. With its ruling the court asserted that Morsi had no right to reconvene parliament after the court ordered it dissolved in June 2012. Though the constituent assembly tasked with drawing up Egypt's new constitution was functioning, after being selected by the dissolved parliament, the SCAF also gave itself the power to choose a new assembly if the current one ran into any problems according to Al Jazeera. In its 9 July statement the military council said its constitutional declaration which gave it broad powers "came as a result of the political, legal and constitutional circumstances that the country was facing" and added that the declaration "ensures the continuity of state institutions and the [military council] until a new constitution is drafted". The military said it was "confident" that all state institutions will respect constitutional declarations.

On 10 July, Egypt's parliament convened despite dissolution, but the session was adjourned by Speaker Saad al-Katatni after the members of parliament approved Katatni's proposal that the parliament seek legal advice from the Court of Cassation on how to implement the supreme court's ruling. Thousands gathered in Cairo in protest of a ruling by Egypt's Supreme Constitutional Court to freeze the decree issued by President Mohamed Morsi to reinstate the Islamist-led parliament. While the Supreme Constitutional Court ruled that Morsi did not have the right to reconstitute the body, it also threatened the new president with the equivalent of contempt of court if he continued to reject its decisions. Parliament asked Egypt's Court of Cassation to essentially overrule the aspect of the Supreme Constitutional Court's decision holding that the whole Parliament must be immediately dissolved because of flaws in the electoral system used to fill a third of the seats. The Administrative Court (whose function is the review of executive actions), besides the Supreme Constitutional Court (whose function is the review of statutes) and Court of Cassation (whose function is the handling of appeals of lower court rulings) one of the three highest Courts in Egypt, was also weighing that question and has said it would issue its own ruling on 17 July.

On 11 July, Egypt's President Mohamed Morsi declared he would seek dialogue with political forces and judicial authorities to resolve the row over the dissolved parliament. He also said that he would respect Egypt's Supreme Constitutional Court ruling that blocked his decision to call the nation's parliament back into session.

On 14 July, the parliament's request to examine Egypt's Supreme Constitutional Court ruling that dissolved the Islamist-led assembly was rebuffed by the Court of Cassation. Egypt's highest appeals court unanimously ruled on 14 July 2012 it had no jurisdiction over the implementation of the 14 June 2012 constitutional court ruling.

On 16 July, more than 20000 workers at Egypt's largest textiles manufacturing company, which saw major strikes in 2006 and 2008, began their first day of strikes demanding an increase in wages and more government investment in their sector.

On 19 July, the Administrative Judiciary Court of the State Council put on hold all appeals against the formulation of the Constituent Assembly, tasked with drafting a new constitution, until the court decided on 30 July 2012 on suits calling for a change of the judge presiding over the case. The court was also looking at a case filed against the supplementary constitutional decree released by the Supreme Council of Armed Forces days before President Mohamed Morsi's inauguration, and another against the president's decision to bring back the People's Assembly, parliament's lower house that SCAF dissolved after the Supreme Constitutional Court ruled the parliamentary elections law unconstitutional. The court ruled lack of jurisdiction on both cases and referred the latter back to the Supreme Constitutional Court. Egyptian president Mohamed Morsi ordered to release 572 people detained by the Egyptian military in the 2011 protests, and reduced the sentence of 16 others from life sentence to seven years in jail.

On 30 July, the Administrative Judiciary Court of the State Council ruled on 30 July to postpone the case calling for the dissolution of the Constituent Assembly to 24 September, giving the assembly enough time to complete the drafting of Egypt's new constitution.

=== August 2012 ===
On 2 August, the first Cabinet under President Mohamed MorsI headed by Prime Minister Hesham Kandil was sworn in.

On 5 August the 2012 Egyptian–Israeli border attack took place. Following this event Egypt's President Morsi fired his intelligence chief, the head of the military police, several Interior Ministry officials, the head of the presidential guard and the governor of North Sinai, while the President during a trip to the border region vowed with respect to the victims of the attack. "We will never, ever rest until we take revenge and bring back justice to those killed."

On 8 August, following the 2012 Egyptian–Israeli border attack Egyptian forces launched aerial strikes on militants in response to a series of attacks by masked gunmen on military checkpoints as part of a broader operation against Islamist militant organizations in the Sinai Peninsula.

On 12 August, Morsi asked Mohamad Hussein Tantawi, head of the country's armed forces, and Sami Anan, the Army chief of staff, to resign and Morsi assumed legislative powers. Morsi's spokesman, Yasser Ali, announced that both Tantawi and Anan would remain advisers to the president. Tantawi and Anan were kept on as "special counsels to the president" with undisclosed roles and were given Egypt's highest state honour, the Grand Collar of the Nile. Morsi named Abdul Fatah al-Sisi, who served as chief of military intelligence until 2014, as Egypt's new defense minister. He also replaced Egypt Chief of Staff Lieutenant General Sami Hafez Anan with General Sedki Sobhi. General Mohamed al-Assar, a member of the Supreme Council of the Armed Forces, was named an assistant defense minister. Morsi also pushed out the chiefs of the navy, the air force and the air defense branch of Egypt armed forces. More specifically Vice Admiral Mohab Mamish, Commander of the Egyptian Navy; Lieutenant General Abd El Aziz Seif-Eldeen, Commander of the Egyptian Air Defense Forces; and Air Marshal Reda Mahmoud Hafez, Commander of the Egyptian Air Force were relieved from duty and moved on to civilian roles. Morsi said his decisions had not been intended to humiliate the military. "I never meant to antagonize anyone," Morsi said. "We go on to new horizons, with new generations, with new blood that has long been awaited." "I want the armed forces to devote themselves to a mission that is holy to all of us, which is protecting the nation," he said in a televised address. "The decisions I took today were not meant ever to target certain persons, nor did I intend to embarrass institutions, nor was my aim to narrow freedoms," he said. "I did not mean to send a negative message about anyone, but my aim was the benefit of this nation and its people." Morsi also announced that the constitutional amendments passed by the Supreme Council of the Armed Forces (SCAF) that had gutted the authority of his office, were invalid and replaced them with a declaration that gave him broad legislative and executive powers in addition to a decisive role in the drafting of Egypt's still unfinished new constitution. In addition Morsi appointed a senior judge and Muslim Brotherhood favorite, Mahmoud Mekki, as his vice president. The new constitutional decree Morsi released was made up of just four articles. Among the powers Morsi assumed was the power to select a new panel to write Egypt's constitution, if the current panel could finish its work, and the full power to author, approve, and promulgate legislation. This marked the "completion of Egyptian revolution," said an unidentified spokesman according to the Jerusalem Post. The New York Times described the move as an "upheaval" and a "stunning purge", given the power that SCAF had taken after the fall of Mubarak. Morsi's moves triggered support for and protest against his 12 August decisions, while legal experts questioned legitimacy of Morsi's constitutional changes and conflicting reports emerged from military officials over whether Morsi consulted with the armed forces regarding his decision to retire Tantawi and Anan. Al Jazeera described it as "escalating the power struggle" between the president and military.

On 14 August 2012, Mohamed Salem, an Egyptian lawyer, filed a legal challenge over Morsi's removal of Tantawi and Anan, arguing that Morsi planned to bring back the totalitarian regime.

On 23 August, Egyptian President Mohamed Morsi issued a new law cancelling the Mubarak-era practice of temporarily detaining journalists for so-called "publication offences," including the charge of "offending the president of the republic." With this law Morsi outlawed the pretrial detention of people accused of press crimes. A Constitutional Declaration issued by Morsi earlier in August 2012 gave the president full legislative powers, which he will command until the election of a new parliament.

=== September 2012 ===
On 8 September, the Administrative Court of the State Council postponed its decision on the constitutionality of Egypt's Constituent Assembly until 2 October 2012.

On 11 September, a protest was organized by Wesam Abdel-Wareth, a Salafist leader and president of Egypt's Hekma television channel, who called for a gathering at 5 pm in front of the United States Embassy, to protest against a film that he thought was named Muhammad's Trial, which is actually called Innocence of Muslims. After the trailer for the film began circulating, Nader Bakkar, the Egyptian Salafist Nour Party's spokesman, and Muhammad al-Zawahiri, the brother of al-Qaeda leader Ayman al Zawihiri, called for Egyptians to assemble outside of the American embassy. About 3,000 demonstrators, many of them from the ultraconservative Salafist movement, responded to his call. A dozen men were then reported to have scaled the embassy walls, after which one of them tore down the flag of the United States and replaced it with a black Islamist flag with the inscription of the shahada: "There is no god but God and Muhammad is the messenger of God". Some of the protesters also wrote "There is no God but Allah" on the compound walls. According to Sherine Tadros of Al Jazeera, the protesters demanded that the film be taken "out of circulation" and that some of the protesters would stay at the site until that happens. Thousands of Egyptian riot police were at the embassy following the breach of the walls; they eventually persuaded the trespassers to leave the compound without the use of force. After that, only a few hundred protesters remained outside the compound. Egypt's prime minister Hesham Kandil said "a number" of protesters later confessed to getting paid to participate.

On 14 September, in the town of Sheikh Zuwayed in the Sinai Peninsula, protesters stormed a compound of the Multinational Force and Observers, designed to monitor the peace treaty between Egypt and Israel. The peacekeeping force opened fire on the protesters. Two members of the peacekeeping force were wounded. Ahmad Fouad Ashoush, a Salafist Muslim cleric, said: "I issue a fatwa and call on the Muslim youth in America and Europe to do this duty, which is to kill the director, the producer and the actors and everyone who helped and promoted the film." Another Muslim cleric, Ahmed Abdullah (aka Abu Islam) tore up the Bible and threw the torn pages on the ground during 11 September embassy attack.

On 22 September, Egypt's Supreme Administrative Court upheld an earlier Supreme Constitutional Court ruling, which had ordered the dissolution of the lower house of Egypt's parliament (People's Assembly) based on the unconstitutionality of some of the parliamentary elections law. The administrative court said that since the electoral laws on which the People's Assembly was elected were found to be unconstitutional, the entire composition of the assembly is invalid.

On 23 September, Egypt's Supreme Administrative Court issued a verdict supporting the right of former members of the now-defunct National Democratic Party (NDP), which was formally disbanded by an administrative court in April 2011, the NDP to run in parliamentary elections.

=== October 2012 ===
On 1 October, Egypt's doctors began a partial strike that lasted for weeks.

On 2 October, The Administrative Court of the State Council postponed its decision on the constitutionality of Egypt's Constituent Assembly until 9 October 2012.

On 8 October, Egyptian president Morsi ordered a pardon for all persons who already had convictions and those who were still under investigation or who were on trial for deeds "committed with the aim of supporting the revolution and bringing about its objectives." The decree included felonies and misdemeanors committed to support the uprising to achieve its goals from 25 January 2011 until 30 June 2012 except crimes of first degree murder. It abided the general prosecutor and the military attorney general. Each one in his field was to publish a list for those given amnesty in the official newspaper. The persons missed could submit a complaint within a month of the date of publication, and one or more committees would be formed to consider the complaints under the presidency of the head of court of cessation within thirty days of the date of the complaints.

On 9 October, The Administrative Court of the State Council postponed its decision on the constitutionality of Egypt's Constituent Assembly until 16 October 2012 in order to review more documents.

On 10 October, Egypt's prosecutor general Abdel-Maguid Mahmoud failed to win a conviction of two dozen Mubarak allies charged with orchestrating an attack by thugs on the protesters who ousted Mubarak. Some of the thugs were mounted, and the resulting melee became known as 2 February 2011 Battle of the Camels where men riding horses and camels charged into crowds on Cairo's Tahrir Square, setting off two days of clashes that ended with killing of nearly a dozen people. Activist groups and political parties called for a nationwide protest on 12 October 2011 after a court acquitted all 24 people charged with involvement in the Battle of Camels.

On 11 October, despite the fact that Egyptian law protects the prosecutor general from being ousted by the president, President Morsi ordered Egypt's prosecutor general Abdel-Maguid Mahmoud to leave his position to defuse public anger over acquittals in the Battle of the Camels case. Mahmoud, however, refused to step down and become Egypt's ambassador to the Vatican.

On 12 October, critics and supporters of President Morsi clashed in Cairo's Tahrir Square during a rally, as liberal and secular activists erupted with anger accusing the Muslim Brotherhood of trying to take over the country. The rally sharpened the nation's tensions over its political direction and the failure to bring loyalists of the former government to justice for their actions during Battle of the Camels The clashes erupted between two competing rallies in Tahrir. One was by liberal and secular activists to criticize Morsi's failure to achieve promises he had made for first 100 days in power and to demand greater diversity on the panel tasked with writing Egypt's new constitution, the other had been called by Morsi's Muslim Brotherhood to call for judicial reforms and to support the move by Morsi on 11 October 2012 to remove the prosecutor-general. The secular camp accused the Brotherhood of holding the gathering to "hijack" the square from their anti-Morsi protest. The violence erupted when Morsi supporters stormed a stage set up by the rival camp, angered by chants they perceived as insults to the president.

On 13 October, Morsi backed down from his decision to remove the country's top prosecutor Abdel-Maguid Mahmoud, keeping him in his post and sidestepping a potential clash with the country's powerful judiciary. The two-day standoff between Morsi and Prosecutor General Mahmoud escalated with a backlash from a powerful group of judges who said Morsi's move had infringed upon their authority and on the judiciary's independence. Egypt's Vice President Mahmoud Mekki told reporters after meeting the prosecutor that the president agreed to suspend the decision to make Mahmoud Egypt's ambassador to the Vatican following a request from the country's Supreme Judicial Council. Mekki said the presidency had announced the decision to make Mahmoud Egypt's ambassador to the Vatican after initially understanding that Mahmoud had agreed to step down as Prosecutor General. After meeting Morsi and his advisers, Mahmoud told The Associated Press that "a misunderstanding" had been resolved.

On 16 October, The Administrative Court of the State Council postponed its decision on the constitutionality of Egypt's Constituent Assembly until 23 October 2012.

On 23 October, Egypt's Supreme Administrative Court referred the law regulating the Constituent Assembly to the Supreme Constitutional Court and hence suspended the hearing of lawsuits that sought the dissolution of the assembly charged with drafting the new constitution. Plaintiffs from 48 lawsuits demanded the dissolution of the Constituent Assembly claiming the Assembly failed to proportionately represent various social sectors, and violated the interim constitution by including MPs as members. More specifically, the Administrative Court referred Law 79/2012, which granted the assembly immunity from dissolution, to the Supreme Constitutional Court, which will rule on the law based on the Constitutional Declaration that has governed the country since the fall of former President Mubarak. The parliament had approved the law on the same day of its formation two days before Parliament was dissolved. However, the Supreme Council of the Armed Forces refused to pass the law. After decreeing the return of the People's Assembly, President Morsy approved the stalled law to prevent the dissolution of the Constituent Assembly. Judge Nazih Tangho of the High Administrative Court referred the case to the Constitutional Court to look into the law that gave the constitutional panel legal immunity, a clause he said needed vetting because no one should be above legal supervision. "The law was meant to prevent the High Administrative Court from looking into appeals ... against the panel," he said. Muslim Brotherhood lawyer Abdel Moneim Abdel Maqsoud stated that the Supreme Constitutional Court needed at least two months to rule on the case, citing the law that obliged it to consider the cases 45 days after its referral.

=== November 2012 ===
Sometime between 18 and 21 November, secular groups walked out of the constitutional constituent assembly because they believed that it would impose strict Islamic practices, while members of the Muslim Brotherhood supported Morsi and denied such allegations. Protesters battled the police in Cairo's Mohamed Mahmoud Street over the slow pace of change in Egypt, after thousands of protesters had returned to the streets around Tahrir Square demanding political reforms and the prosecution of officials blamed for killing demonstrators as well as to protest against Morsi and the growing influence of the Muslim Brotherhood. The protests held to commemorate four days of street fighting between protesters and security forces in November 2011 had already turned violent on 19 November 2012.

On 22 November, Morsi issued a constitutional declaration and dismissed Egypt's prosecutor general Abdel Maguid Mahmoud who was replaced by Talaat Ibrahim Abdullah. This caused a disagreement amongst Egyptian judges and condemnation from various organizations. His decree was called "an unprecedented attack on judicial independence" by the Supreme Council of the Judiciary. Morsi said that the decree was made to prevent the courts from dissolving the Constitutional Assembly. Three protests were held outside the court building. Mohamed ElBaradei, a former UN diplomat, called for withdrawal of the decree. While the declaration was immediately criticized by Morsi opponents, his supporters defended Morsi's move. Morsi's declaration contained the following:

- All investigations into the killing of protesters or the use of violence against them would be re-conducted; trials of those accused would be re-held. With the declaration a new "protection of the revolution" judicial body was also created to swiftly carry out the prosecutions, but the decree would not lead to retrials of the dozens of lower-level police officers who have been acquitted or received suspended sentences in trials for killing protesters – verdicts that have outraged many Egyptians. That exclusion would guarantee Morsi the loyalty of the powerful but hated police force.
- All constitutional declarations, laws and decrees made since Mr Morsi assumed power could not be appealed or cancelled by any individual, or political or governmental body
- The public prosecutor would be appointed by the president for a fixed term of four years, and must be aged at least 40
- The constituent assembly's timeline for drafting the new constitution was extended by two months.
- No judicial authority could dissolve the constituent assembly or the upper house of parliament (Shura Council)
- The president was authorised to take any measures he saw fit in order to preserve the revolution, to preserve national unity or to safeguard national security

On 23 November, protests erupted in Cairo, the port city of Alexandria and elsewhere around Egypt, as opponents of Morsi clashed with his supporters over his 22 November declaration. Protesters torched the offices of Egypt's ruling Islamist party, the Muslim Brotherhood's Freedom and Justice Party, in Suez, Alexandria and other cities. Essam el-Erian, a leading figure of Morsi's FJP, condemned attacks on party property. Media organizations noted that the events showed Egypt was a divided country. Morsi defended amid the protests before his supporters his declaration stating that he was working to secure a strong and stable nation and leading Egypt on a path to "freedom and democracy".

On 24 November, the Supreme Judicial Council lambasted the president's constitutional declaration and called it an "unprecedented attack on the independence of the judicial branch". The leadership of the Egypt Judges Club, an association of judges from across the country, called for a nationwide strike in all courts and prosecution offices to protest the president's declaration. State news media reported that judges and prosecutors had already declared a strike in Alexandria. MENA news agency reported that Egyptian human rights agencies filed a lawsuit at the Court of Administrative Justice calling for the declaration to be annulled. There were also clashes in Cairo between protesters and security forces, between opponents and supporters of the government.

On 25 November, shares on Egypt's stock market plunged almost 10%. Trading was suspended for 30 minutes as shares slumped in the first session since the president's 22 November constitutional declaration. The Muslim Brotherhood had called for nationwide protests on 25 November in support of Morsi's declaration. Judges in two of the country's 27 provinces, including Alexandria, heeded the call to strike while those elsewhere in the country were meeting to decide their response. After a meeting with Egypt's justice minister, Ahmed Mekki urged judges not to disrupt their work by joining in a proposed strike over the decree. But the council also urged the president to scale back his writ, to limit the immunity from judicial review he decreed for "laws and decisions issued by the president as sovereignty acts", a reference to Egyptian legal precedents that could justify such executive action in certain circumstances. The Muslim Brotherhood's party offices in Damanhour, Alexandria, Mansoura, Suez and Cairo were ransacked and damaged in the wake of the 22 November constitutional declaration. Five hundred people were injured in clashes with the police, and 15-year-old Islam Fathi Masoud died after being hit on the head with a club wielded by one of dozens of men who attacked the MB's offices in the northern city of Damanhour. The Al-Ahram state newspaper said that three women were victims of sexual assault during an anti-Morsi demonstration. Egypt state news media reported that Morsi advisers who had resigned over the decree included Samir Morqos, one of the few Christians in the administration; Sekina Fouad, one of the few women, and Farouk Guweida, a poet and intellectual.

On 26 November, The Court of Administrative Justice said it would hold a first hearing on 4 December in a case brought by lawyers and activists against the declaration. Morsi met with representatives of the Supreme Judicial Council in an effort to settle the crisis over the extent of his powers following his 22 November constitutional declaration. He agreed to limit his decree on his decisions related to "sovereign matters" only. Morsi "did not give himself judicial power" but did provide "immunity for his presidential decisions," said Jihad Haddad, a senior adviser in the Freedom and Justice Party. Haddad added that "the president himself (is) not immune from judicial oversight," though it wasn't clear in what circumstances that might apply, or if there was anything preventing Morsi from issuing a new decree to forestall that. According to Al-Jazeera "sovereign matters" were widely interpreted to cover the declaration of war, imposition of martial law, breaking diplomatic relations with a foreign nation, or dismissing the cabinet. Activists on Monday camped in Cairo's Tahrir Square for a fourth day, blocking traffic with makeshift barricades to protest against what they said was a power-grab by Morsi. Nearby, riot police and protesters clashed intermittently. In addition to popular outbursts on the street, Egypt's judges reacted. All but seven of Egypt's 34 courts and 90% of its prosecutors went on strike Monday in protest, according to Judge Mohamed al-Zind of the Egyptian Judge's Club. Muslim Brotherhood supporters staged a counter-demonstration, while they were relocated from central Cairo to a location in front of Cairo University in Giza. Egypt's stock market, which had seen a fall of almost 10% on 25 November 2012, recovered some ground on Monday morning. Islam Fathy Massoud member of the Muslim Brotherhood was killed during protests in Damanhour. Gaber Salah, a member of the April 6 Youth Movement, was pronounced dead. He had received a rubber bullet shot at close range during clashes with riot police in downtown Cairo. The funeral of Islam Fathy Massoud, who died in the Nile Delta town of Damanhour in a clash between the president's supporters and opponents, was held on Monday, while in Cairo thousands of people marched through Tahrir Square for the funeral of Gaber Salah.

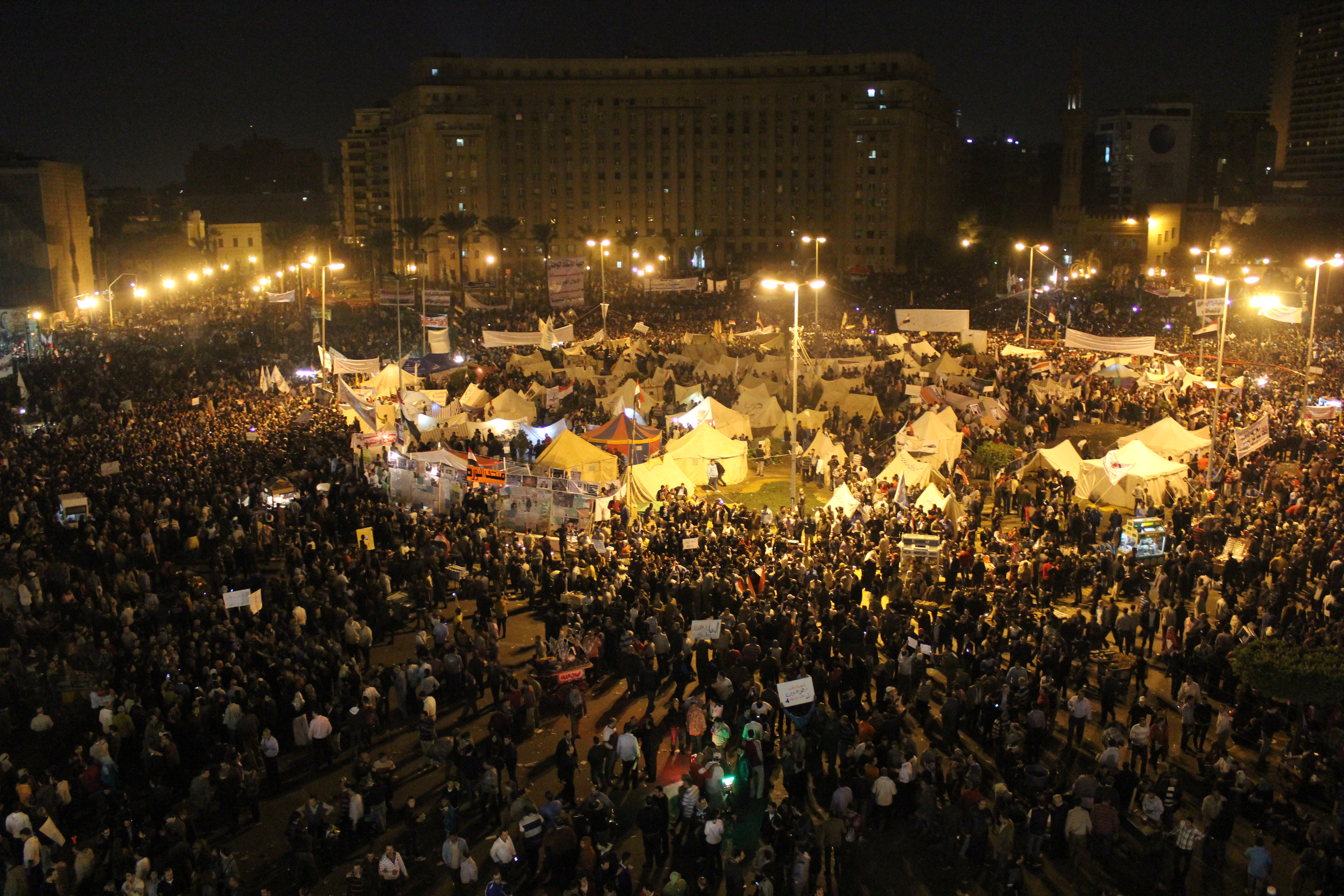
Hundreds of thousands of people protesting in Tahrir Square on the evening of 27 November 2012

On 27 November, tens of thousands of people held protests in Cairo against Morsi demanding that their first freely elected leader respect their wishes either to roll back his 22 November constitutional declaration or to resign. At least one demonstrator died in early clashes with authorities before Tuesday night's massive rally. The opposition Popular Alliance Party said the protester died after inhaling excessive amounts of tear gas, which police used in numerous scuffles with rock-throwing protesters on the side streets leading to the square. And in the Nile Delta city of Mahalla, police reported dozens of injuries when demonstrators stormed and destroyed the headquarters of the Muslim Brotherhood. Protests were also held in Alexandria and other cities. FJP offices in Alexandria and Mansoura were stormed, with the latter set ablaze. The Muslim Brotherhood scrapped its own demonstration to show support for Morsi – also scheduled for 27 November 2012 – "to avoid any problems due to tension in the political arena," according to spokesman Mahmoud Ghozlan.

On 28 November, in an interview with TIME magazine Morsi said of his 22 November constitutional declaration: "If we had a constitution, then all of what I have said or done last week, will stop. ... when we have a constitution, what I have issued will stop immediately. ... " The Constituent Assembly of Egypt rushed to finish its work amid widespread protests against Morsi and his declaration. The rush toward a new constitution spurred a walkout among its drafters, i.e. liberals, human rights activists, and others who were unsatisfied with a range of provisions dealing with the role of religion in the state, the status of women, and the privileges accorded to the country's army. According to the BBC's Jon Leybe the move was designed to preempt a ruling by Egypt's Supreme Constitutional Court on 2 December, which might once again dissolve the assembly. The Brotherhood hoped that the decree replaced by a completely new constitution would be approved on a referendum and put an end to the unrest. Low-level rallies continued in Cairo's Tahrir Square on Wednesday. Dozens of police officers, backed by trucks firing tear gas, arrested numerous protesters, some of whom were beaten by officers as others continued to throw stones at police. The Brotherhood organized counter-demonstrations, including one in Egypt's second city, Alexandria, which attracted a few thousand participants. As protests mounted over Morsi's decision to grant himself sweeping powers until the text of the constitution was ratified in a referendum, the panel tasked with writing the constitution wrapped up its deliberations on Wednesday and readied for a vote on Thursday. By 28 November two more people were killed and hundreds more injured. Egypt Independent reported that one of the dead was Fathy Ghareeb, a founder of the Socialist Popular Alliance Party, who died by suffocation caused by the tear gas fired by the Central Security Forces (CSF) in Tahrir Square. Egypt's Court of Cassation, the country's highest appeals court, the Cairo Appeals Court, and other appeals courts suspended their work until Morsi's decree was rescinded.

On 29 November, voting on the new constitution by the Constituent Assembly of Egypt began, and continued through Thursday night. There were protests against Morsi outside the presidential palace and a small protest supporting Morsi in Giza on the outskirts of Cairo. The new constitution adopted the first part of the draft that included the Sharia as the main source of legislation and making Islam a state religion. Egyptian State TV reported that Christianity and Judaism would be the main source for legislation for Christians and Jews. The liberals, left-wing, and Christians boycotted the assembly and accused the Islamists of trying to impose their vision; they also accused them of trying to limit freedom of speech as well as not including articles establishing equality between men and women.

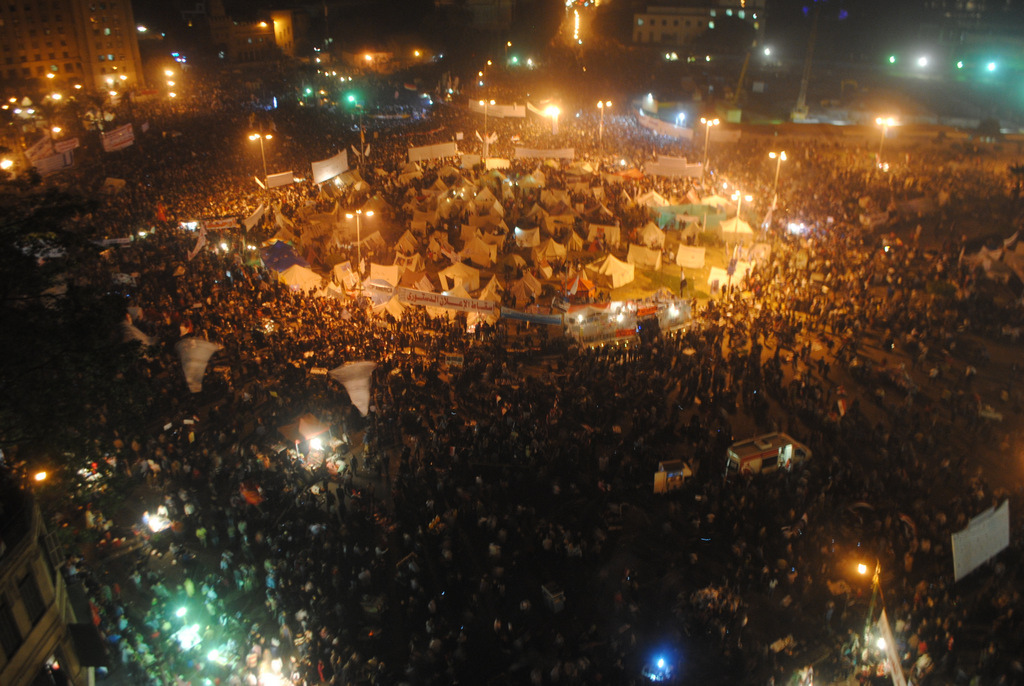
Hundreds of thousands of people protesting in Tahrir Square on 30 November 2012

On 30 November, racing against the threat of dissolution by Supreme Constitutional Court judges appointed by the ousted Mubarak, quickly defusing anger about Morsi's 22 November declaration granting himself expanded presidential powers and ignoring howls of protest from secular opponents, the Islamists drafting the new constitution voted on 29 November 2012 to approve the 2012 Draft Constitution of Egypt that human rights groups and international experts said was full of holes and ambiguities and that was criticized by secular, liberal and Coptic Egyptians. Thousands of Egyptians took to the streets in various governorates to denounce the constitutional declaration issued on 22 November, as well as the final draft of the constitution approved by the Islamist-dominated Constituent Assembly. In Alexandria, anti-Morsi protesters clashed with Morsi's supporters, but no injuries were reported.

=== December 2012 ===
On 1 December, Morsi announced that a constitutional referendum on the 2012 Draft Constitution of Egypt would be held on 15 December 2012. Islamist backers of Morsi held mass rallies at Cairo University and other cities to support his sweeping new powers and the drafting of a constitution, while several thousand of Morsi's opponents rallied in Tahrir Square to oppose the draft constitution and what they described as Morsi's power grab.

On 2 December, the Supreme Constitutional Court put off its much-awaited ruling on the legitimacy of the constituent assembly that passed the draft constitution, and on a separate but related decision about whether to dissolve the Shura Council, Egypt's upper house of parliament. It said it was halting all work indefinitely in protest against the "psychological pressure" it had faced, after Islamist protesters earlier prevented the judges from meeting in Cairo. Anti-Morsi protesters continued to occupy Tahrir Square. Leaders of the Judges Club, a powerful but unofficial body which represents judges across the country, announced that its members would refuse to perform their customary roles as election supervisors and would thus try to block a referendum on the new constitution scheduled for 15 December.

On 3 December the Supreme Judicial Council, said that judges and prosecutors would supervise the constitutional referendum to be held on 15 December despite the Judges Club strike announcement from 2 December. In addition, seven cases against Morsi's call for the referendum were filed in an administrative court

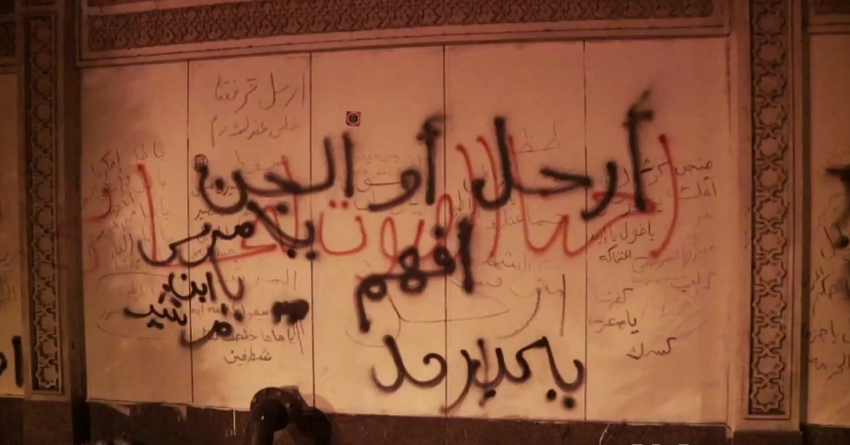
Anti-Morsi graffiti

On 4 December, police fought the demonstrators in front of the Presidential Palace in Cairo. Demonstrators proclaimed a march to the Presidential Palace, calling it "the last warning." The demonstrators cut through a barbed-wire barrier near the Palace, after which police fired tear gas at them as Morsi fled. More violence broke out at the headquarters of the Freedom and Justice Party in Menia, south of Cairo, where the front of the party headquarters was damaged. Egypt Independent, the English-language sister publication of the country's largest independent daily, Al Masry Al Youm, and 10 others did not publish to protest limits on the draft constitution's protections for freedom of expression and freedom of the press. Prosecutor General Talaat Ibrahim Abdallah filed a complaint charging former presidential candidates Moussa and Sabbahi, as well as El-Baradei, Wafd Party president El-Sayyid el-Badawi, and Judges Club head Ahmed al-Zend with espionage and inciting to overthrow the government. The lawyer who filed the report, Hamed Sadeq, claimed that Moussa met with former Israeli Foreign Minister Tzipi Livni and agreed with her to fabricate a crisis. It was further alleged that all of politicians named in the complaint met at the Wafd Party headquarters to execute the "Zionist plot."

On 5 December 100,000 people were estimated to have protested at the Presidential Palace and at Tahrir Square against Morsi's constitution, asserting it represented an effort to seize control of the judiciary. Many began demanding the "fall of the regime" as they fought running battles with police who deployed tear gas before retreating from the area, outnumbered by protesters. Supporters of the Muslim Brotherhood attacked 300 of Morsi's opponents during a sit-in. Members of the Egyptian Popular Current Mohamed Essam and Karam Gergis were killed in the clashes surrounding Heliopolis Palace between protesters against the new Constitution and Muslim Brotherhood members, which attacked the demonstrators with molotov cocktails. The Health Ministry reported four were killed and 271 were injured. Masked men set fire to Muslim Brotherhood offices in Suez, Ismailia and Zagazig.

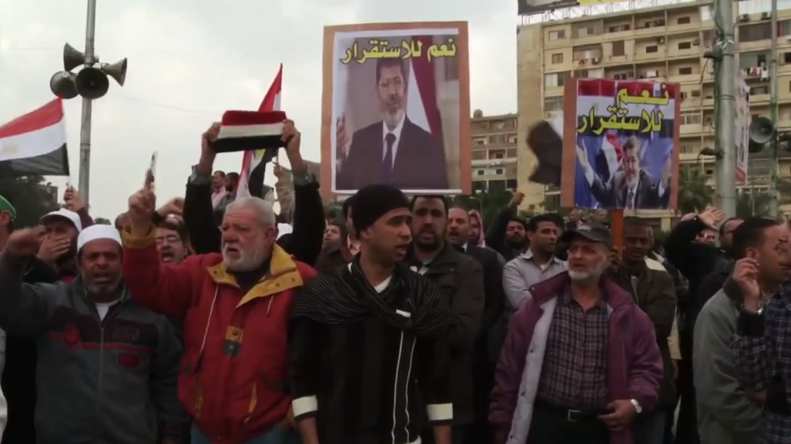
Pro-Morsi rally

On 6 December, supporters of Morsi and the Muslim Brotherhood held counter protests the next day at the Presidential Palace, and clashed with anti-Morsi protesters in street battles that saw seven people killed and more than 650 injured. Morsi met with Abdul Fatah al-Sisi, chief of the Egyptian Army, and with his cabinet ministers, to discuss a "means to deal with the situation on different political, security, and legal levels to stabilize Egypt and protect the gains of the revolution." Soldiers backed by tanks moved in to restore order as the death toll began to rise. While addressing the nation, Morsi criticized the opposition "for trying to incite violence" against his legitimacy. During his speech he invited his opponents to a common dialogue, but they rejected it because Morsi remained determined to press forward with the referendum on the Islamist-backed draft constitution that had plunged Egypt into a political crisis. Meanwhile, the government imposed a curfew after the military sent tanks and armored vehicles into Cairo. Morsi's family was forced to evacuate their home in Zagazig, 47 miles (76 km) northeast of Cairo. Four of Morsi's advisers resigned their posts in protest against the violence, which they claimed was orchestrated by the Muslim Brotherhood supporters.

On 7 December, Morsi supporters and anti-Morsi demonstrators continued their protests in different cities including Cairo, Alexandria, and Assiut. Demonstrators in Assiut chanted "No Brotherhood, no Salafis, Egypt is a civic state." Dozens of protesters threw rocks and glass bottles at Morsi's home in Sharkia province and tried to push aside a police barrier. Advisers and Brotherhood leaders acknowledged that outside his core base of Islamist supporters Morsi felt increasingly isolated in the political arena and even within his own government. Opposition leaders said in a statement that Morsi's 6 December dialogue offer failed to meet "the principles of real and serious negotiations" and displayed "the complete disregard" for the opposition's demands. They said they would not negotiate with Morsi until he canceled his 22 November decree and called off the 15 December referendum on the draft constitution. Opposition protesters marched on the presidential palace and breached a security perimeter built by the military's elite Republican Guard – charged with protecting the palace – which withdrew behind the palace walls. The Egyptian newspaper Al-Masry Al-Youm also reported that individuals suspected of protesting against the Muslim Brotherhood were being tortured and beaten in a facility run by the Brotherhood in Heliopolis, a Cairo suburb.

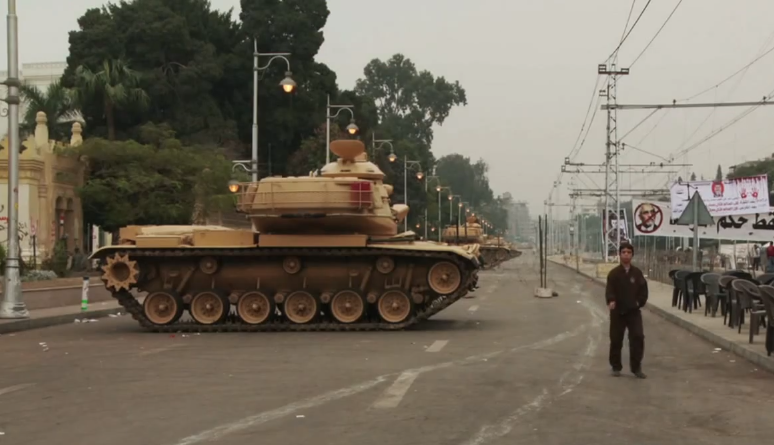
Tanks sent near the presidential palace

On 8 December, The Egyptian Army issued its first statement since the protests erupted, stating that it would protect public institutions and innocent people and not allow the events to become more serious. The Qandil Cabinet also authorized the army to help Egypt's police maintain security. Egypt state news media reported that Morsi was moving toward imposing a form of martial law to secure the streets and allow the vote on the draft charter constitutional referendum. Morsi annulled his decree which had expanded his presidential authority and removed judicial review of his decrees. In addition the mostly annulled November 2012 constitutional declaration would be replaced by a modified one.

On 9 December, confusion and disarray pervaded the ranks of Egypt's opposition after Morsi rescinded his 22 November constitutional declaration a day earlier. Despite the declaration's annulment the general prosecutor, who was dismissed, will not be reinstated, and the retrial of the former regime officials will go ahead. Opposition leaders also called for more protests after Morsi refused to cancel the constitutional referendum in the wake of the declaration's annulment. In response, the Alliance of Islamist Forces, an umbrella group that includes Morsi's Muslim Brotherhood, said it would hold rival demonstrations. The group said its rallies would support of the referendum and the president under the slogan "Yes to legitimacy".

On 10 December, the opposition group, the National Salvation Front, announced that it would organize a rally on 11 December.

=== January 2013 ===
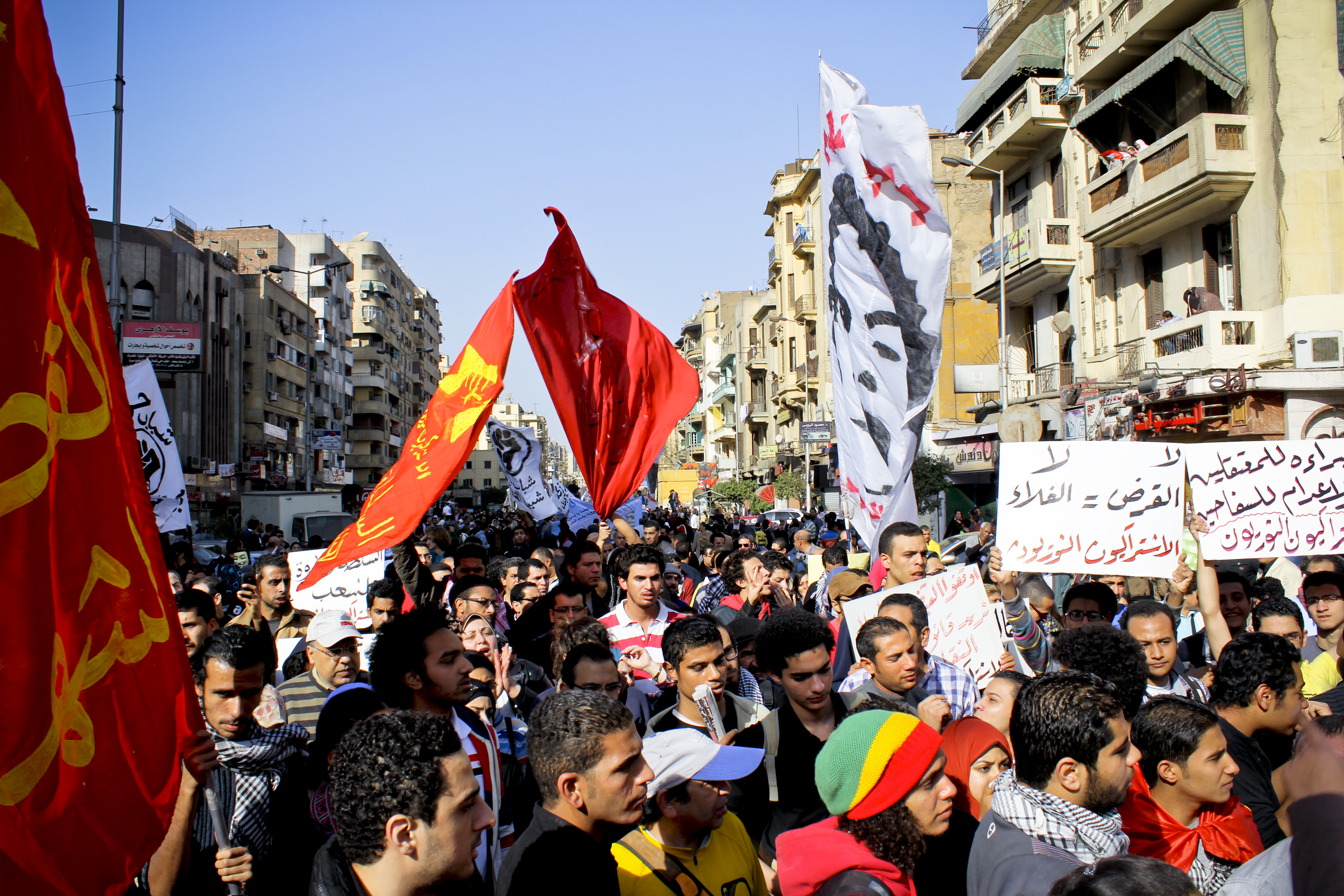
Shubra March to Tahrir on 25 January

On the second anniversary of the beginning of the 2011 revolution, protests again erupted in cities across the country, following occasional skirmishes between protesters and police in Cairo the day before. Tens of thousands of people gathered in Tahrir Square during the day, with clashes between police forces and protesters occurring around the city at the Interior Ministry headquarters, state media offices and the presidential palace. Security forces fired tear gas at protesters trying to force their way into the presidential palace and state television offices. In the city of Suez, five people were killed by gunfire – four protesters and one security trooper. Protests also took place in Alexandria, Ismailia, Damanhur, and Port Said, many of which were focused on local government buildings. Tear gas use by police was reported in Alexandria, while protesters in that city and Suez burned tires. By the end of 25 January, about 280 protesters and 55 security personnel had been injured across the country.

On 26 January, the sentencing to death of 21 people for their roles in the Port Said Stadium disaster sparked further unrest in Port Said that resulted in 16 fatalities. The number of people killed in the city was 33. Many of them were killed by police snipers.

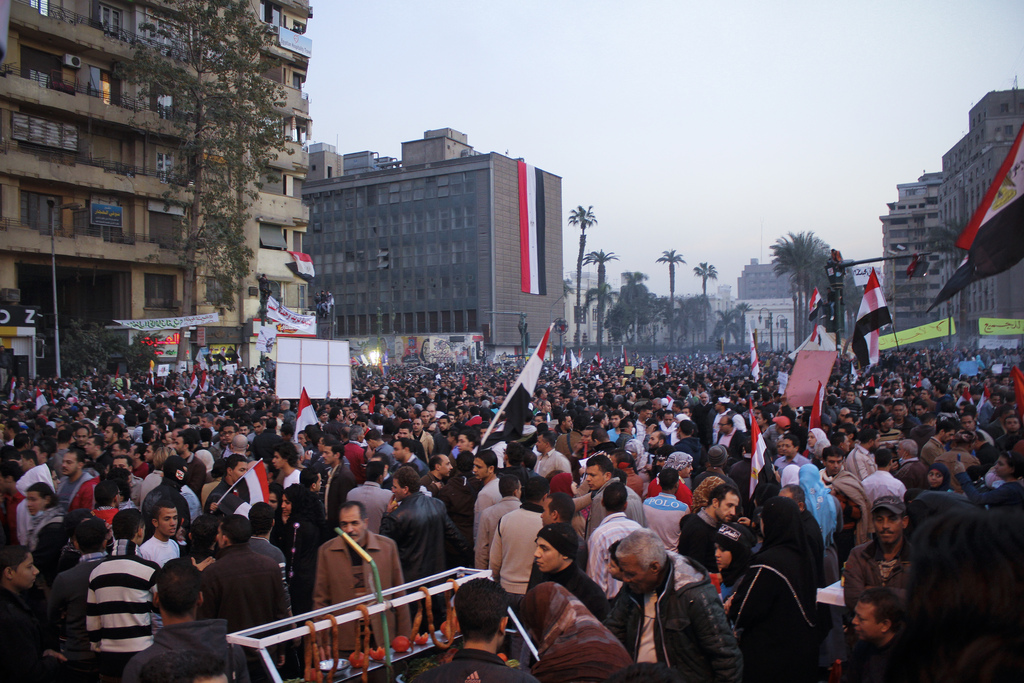
Tahrir Square on 25 January

On 27 January, Egypt's government was reported to have lost control of Port Said as a result of the protests and attacks. The same day seven more people died from gun shots in the clashes during the funerals for 33 people who had been killed on 26 January in the city. There were also deadly clashes in Suez and Ismailia. As a result, Morsi announced a state of emergency in Suez Canal cities (namely Ismailia, Port Said and Suez) for 30 days, with a curfew from 9:00 p.m to 6:00 a.m, effective Monday, 28 January m. Morsi also invited eleven political parties, as well as four major political leaders, to talks concerning the unrest, but the leading opposition party, the National Salvation Front, refused to begin discussions until a new government was put in place and the country's constitution modified.

On 28 January, further demonstrations and clashes took place in eleven cities, including those in the Suez Canal, Alexandria, Monufia and Cairo. The clashes resulted in six deaths. Thousands of people gathered in the Tahrir Square to show their solidarity with those killed over the weekend early in the day. Police fired tear gas at protesters near the Qasr al-Nil Bridge, while further violence spread along the Nile. Protesters also set fire to security vehicles and detained a police officer. The Shura Council approved the President state of emergency decision as per the Constitution requirement. And to aid the police, it approved a law granting judicial seizure powers to the Army. A funeral procession in Port Said devolved into a street battle between mourners and police, with security troops firing tear gas and live ammunition at crowds from police buildings across the city; protesters threw rocks, explosives and gas canisters back at police, and by the end of the day civilians across the city were seen carrying guns and molotov cocktails. A Ministry of the Interior spokesman, however, denied that police had fired on protesters, and said that tear gas had been used only briefly. By the end of the day, a total of 50 people were estimated to have died since the January protests began.

On 29 January, Egypt's defense minister Abdul Fatah al-Sisi warned both pro- and anti-Morsi groups, arguing "their disagreement on running the affairs of the country may lead to the collapse of the state and threatened the future of the coming generations."

On 30 January, two protesters were shot dead by unknown assailants in Cairo, near Tahrir square.

=== February 2013 ===
On 1 February, protesters gathered in front of the presidential residence in Cairo and clashed with riot police officers. President Morsi blamed police officers due to clashes. One protester was shot and killed next to Ettehadiya Palace, and ninety one were injured around the country according to the official sources. One of the wounded protesters who had been hit by birdshot died on 3 February.

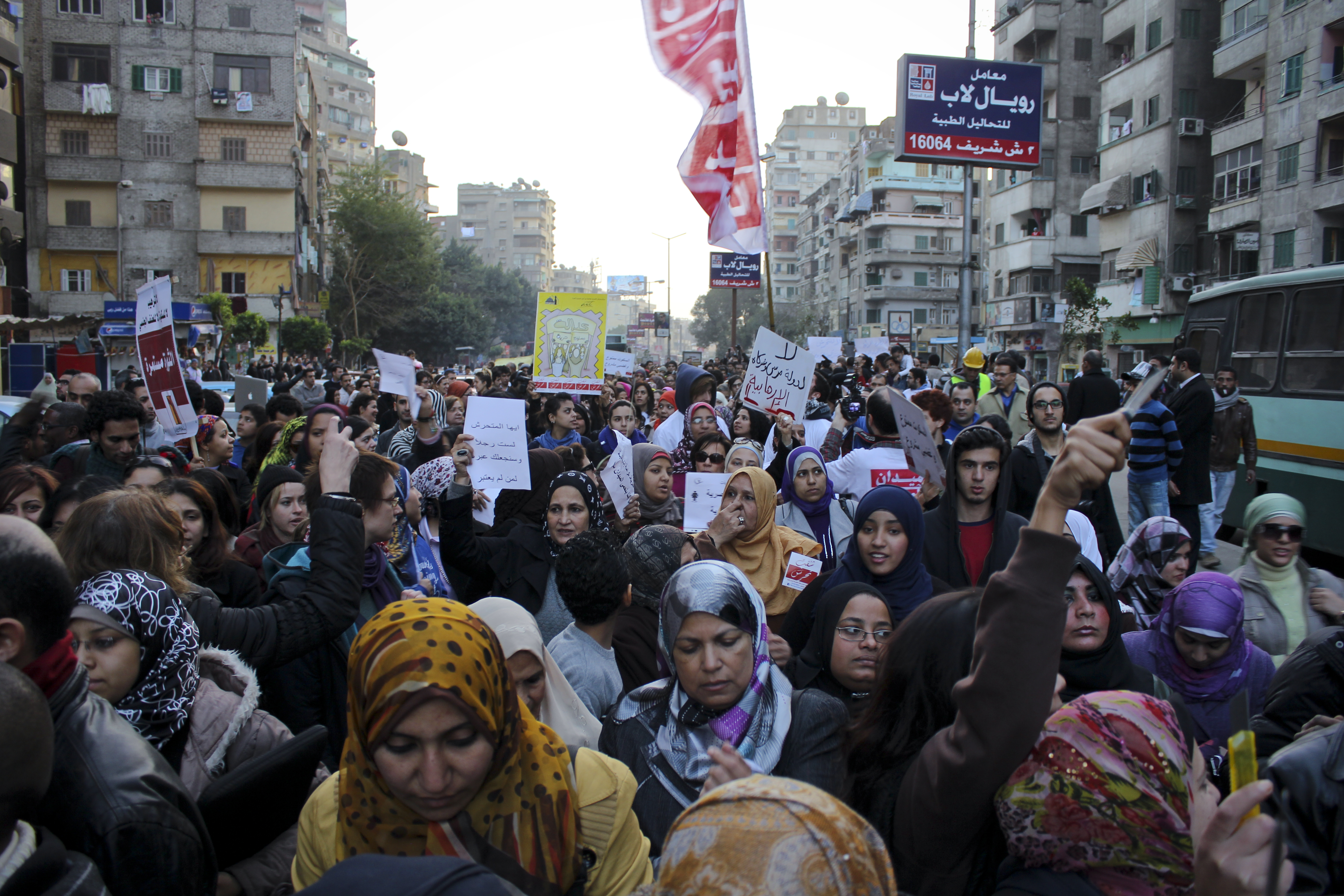
Anti Sexual Harassment March to Tahrir Square, 6 February 2013.

The Egypt Independent reported that police forces dragged a protester, stripped him naked, beat him up with batons, and took him to a security truck. The incident sparked criticism against the administration of Morsi for tolerating the security force's excessive use of force. The presidency said it "was pained by the shocking footage of some policemen treating a protester in a manner that does not accord with human dignity and human rights." State television reported that the 48-year-old beaten man, from a police hospital and without a lawyer present, said that the police had in fact saved him from thieving protesters. The man's daughter, who says she was present at the scene of the attack, said that her father is simply "afraid to talk", while his nephew said "he is lying because there is a lot of pressure on him." In a new twist, Hamada Saber finally retracted his earlier testimony: "I told [prosecutors] today that [police] shot me in the leg, beat me and dragged me," he said. "When I resisted, they tore off my shirt. After I resisted some more, they tore off my pants and underpants. They kept telling me to stand up and I kept telling them I was injured". "Now my family has disowned me; my wife and kids won't talk to me. The whole country is angry at me for [giving false testimony]," Saber added.

Egypt's interior minister, Mohamed Ibrahim, said he would leave if it was in the wishes of the people. Minister of Culture Mohamed Arab resigned from his post in protest at the police assault on protesters, being the third Culture Minister to resign from office since the beginning of the 2011 Egyptian uprising.

On 4 February, Mohamed el-Gendy, a member of the Popular Current tortured by the police following his arrest at Tahrir Square on 27 January, died in the Helal hospital due to his?injuries.

On 11 February, the second anniversary of the former president Mobarak's ouster, people gathered outside the presidential palace, protesting Morsi.

=== March 2013 ===
On 3 March, clashes erupted in Port Said when police fired teargas at demonstrators opposed to the Interior Ministry's decision to transfer 39 detainees from Port Said to the Wadi Natroun Prison, in the Beheira governorate. The clashes took the lives of five peoples, including two policemen and three civilians. News outlets reported that police forces and army troops exchange fire, what was denied by the Egyptian armed forces official spokesperson. Over 500 persons were injured only in Port Said that day, with 39 with bullet wounds.

On 5 March, protester Mohamed Hamed Farouk died from head wounds caused by gas canisters fired by police during protests in Port Said.

On 9 March, three protesters died (one of them an eight-year-old boy) in clashes between demonstrators and police at Qasr al-Nil Bridge, near Tahrir Square. In addition, the headquarters of the Ittihad El-Shorta (the Egyptian National Police football club) and the Egyptian Football Association were torched.

On 30 March, an arrest warrant was issued for Bassem Youssef, host of the satirical news program El Bernameg, for allegedly insulting Islam and Morsi. The move was seen by opponents as part of an effort to silence dissent against Morsi's government. Youssef confirmed the arrest warrant on his Twitter account and said he would hand himself in to the prosecutor's office, jokingly adding, "Unless they kindly send a police van today and save me the transportation hassle." The following day, he was questioned by authorities before being released on bail of 15,000 Egyptian pounds. The event sparked international media attention as well as a segment on Jon Stewart's The Daily Show in which he declared his support for Youssef, calling him a "friend" and "brother" and saying to Morsi: "What are you worried about? You're the President of Egypt! You have an army! Youssef's got puns and a show; you've got tanks and planes."

=== April 2013 ===
In April 2013, protesters fled to Tahrir Square after riot police chased them off with tear gas and pepper spray.

=== May 2013 ===
During Morsis's last days and after the ouster of his regime, the Sinai Peninsula witnessed an ongoing insurgency with several attacks perpetrated by Islamist militants mainly in the North Sinai governorate. Hamas, the Muslim Brotherhood's biggest ally outside of Egypt, is being widely blamed by Egyptians for the attacks in the region although no solid evidence proves it. The reason for Hamas being blamed was the increasing activity in the smuggling tunnels from the Gaza Strip. A case that received wide controversy was the possible involvement of Hamas in the orchestrated attacks on prisons throughout the country on the night of 28 January during the 2011 uprising against Mubarak. In the prison breaks, more than 30 leaders of the Muslim Brotherhood who were imprisoned by Mubarak in the outbreak of revolution, escaped including Mohamed Morsi himself.

On 16 May, seven Egyptian soldiers were kidnapped by unknown militants in the Sinai demanding the release of members of an Islamist group detained for almost two years. One week later, they were reportedly released and handed over to the army in an area south of Rafah after talks mediated by tribal chiefs in the region with president Morsi greeting them upon their arrival at Cairo's airport. The real issue though is Morsi's way of dealing with the crisis with most actions taken by the government to solve the problem receiving wide criticism. Such reactions include Morsi's call for a national dialogue instead of either fighting or negotiating with the kidnappers and for also appearing as being concerned for the safety of the kidnapped soldiers and their kidnappers equally.

Mohamed Sayed Abu-Shaqra, a security officer, was assassinated more than a week later by suspected jihadists near El-Arish while investigating the identity of the kidnappers and their location. During his funeral, relatives and colleagues started chanting against the president forcing the Interior minister to leave the military ceremony.

=== June 2013 ===
On 17 June, Morsi appointed Adel el-Khayat, an Islamist possibly linked to the Luxor massacre where at least 58 tourists were brutally killed by al-Gama'a al-Islamiyya gunmen, as governor of Luxor with 17 other provincial governors. The move sparked protests by tourism workers and activists in Luxor outside el-Khayat's office forcing him to finally resign a week later in order to prevent bloodshed.

On 23 June, four Shia Muslims were attacked by an angry mob led by Salafist preachers. The attackers numbering at least several hundred surrounded the house and demanded Hassan Shehata, a local Shia leader, and his followers who were attending a worshiping ceremony to leave the house before storming it with molotov cocktails. Images showed the attackers beating them to death, lynching and later dragging them through the streets. The tragedy came only a few days after a conference in support of the Syrian uprising that was attended by Morsi and leading Islamist figures. During the conference, Sheikh Mohamed Hassan and al-Gama'a al-Islamiyya's Mohamed Abdel-Maqsoud used sectarian speech against the Shias. Morsi was present during the event so he was heavily criticized by the media for not reacting against the hate and sectarianism used by both clerics.

On 26 June, Morsi delivered a two-hour-and-forty-minute speech to the nation. It was supposed to be a re-conciliatory speech but was widely viewed as provocative and full of threats and accusations targeted against his opponents including media presenters and Ahmed Shafik, his former rival in the 2012 Egyptian presidential elections. He used questionable statistics to describe accomplishments made by his administration in tourism and unemployment. After the speech the opposition stated that it is even more determined to take to the streets on the planned 30 June uprising against the president.

On 28 June, three individuals were killed during clashes between pro- and anti-Morsi protesters in the city of Alexandria, including 21-year-old Andrew Pochter, an American student who was reportedly stabbed to death as he observed the demonstrations. On 29 June 2013, thousands of Egyptians converged on Tahrir Square in Cairo to demonstrate against the Egyptian President Mohamed Morsi, demanding his resignation from office. The demonstrators used the slogan "the people demand the ouster of the regime", used in the protests that led to the ouster of Mubarak in the 2011 revolution.

External videos
- Helicopter view of the Tens of thousands of protesters

By 30 June, thousands of protesters surrounded the presidential palace in the Heliopolis suburb. Demonstrations were reported to be in progress in 18 locations across Cairo and in other different locations across the country including Alexandria, El-Mahalla and cities of the Suez Canal. The demonstrations are described as being backed by multiple entities, including the Tamarod movement formed by members of the Egyptian Movement for Change in April 2013 that claims to have collected 22 million signatures calling for President Morsi's resignation. Opponents of Morsy claimed Google Earth had published figures suggesting 33 million demonstrators were on the streets. Responding to the claims that it recorded 33 million protesters in Tahrir Square, Google confirmed that its engines do not have the ability to estimate numbers of rallies or protests on the ground. Furthermore, it insisted that it does not publish live imaging of protests or any other events on planet earth. Although sources estimate as many as 14 million people roamed the streets of the country, which means about one of every six people of the nation of 84 million took part in Sunday's demonstrations in sweltering heat. Later, pro-Morsi Qatari based Aljazeera News Channel also broadcast a documentary suggesting through calculations and experts analysis that the number of those who protested against Morsi in Cairo couldn't have exceeded 800,000 in Cairo and 4 Millions across Egypt, despite the pro-Morsi Aljazeera channel claiming two years before that Tahrir Square alone had more than one million and up to 2 million people during the 25 January revolution. (Note: Several independent crowd-size analyses carried out in 2011 based on Tahrir Square's physical dimensions and density pointed to smaller numbers, suggesting a maximum capacity of 200,000 to 250,000 individuals within the square and surrounding areas.)

Concurrently with these anti-Morsi demonstrations, supporters of Morsi held demonstrations mainly in Rabaa Square in Cairo. The number of pro-Morsi counter-protesters has been estimated to be about 100,000 people on 21 June (though it's not clear whether as many were on the streets in the period between 30 June and 3 July).

=== July 2013 (ousting of Morsi) ===
On the morning of 1 July, anti-Morsi protesters ransacked the national headquarters of the Muslim Brotherhood in Cairo. Protesters threw objects at windows and looted the building, making off with office equipment and documents. The health ministry confirmed the deaths of eight people who had been killed in clashes around the headquarters in Mokattam.

Hours later, the Egyptian Armed Forces issued a 48-hour ultimatum which gave the country's political parties until 3 July to meet the demands of the Egyptian people. The military also threatened to intervene if the dispute is not resolved by them. Four Ministers also resigned on the same day: Tourism Minister Hisham Zazou (who previously offered to resign a few months ago after Morsi appointed an Islamist linked to the group that attacked tourists as governor of Luxor), Communication and IT Minister Atef Helmi, State Minister for Legal and Parliamentary Affairs Hatem Bagato and State Minister for Environmental Affairs Khaled Abdel Aal, leaving the government with members of the Freedom and Justice Party.

On 2 July Foreign Minister Mohamed Kamel Amr resigned as well in support of the anti-government protesters. The presidency rejected the Egyptian Army's 48-hour ultimatum vowing that the president is sticking with his own plans for national reconciliation to resolve the political crisis. Defense Minister General Abdul Fatah al-Sisi was also said to have told Morsi that he would impose a military solution if a political one could not be found by the next day.

Incidentally the Court of Cassation ordered the reinstatement of former general prosecutor Abdel Maguid Mahmoud who was replaced with Talaat Abdallah following the constitutional declaration on 22 November 2012. The Presidency spokesman and the spokesman for the cabinet resigned as well.

The newspaper Al-Ahram reported that if there was no resolution the military would suspend the constitution of Egypt and appoint a new council of experts to draft a new one, institute a three-person executive council and appoint a prime minister from the military. Morsi's military advisor, Sami Hafez Anan, also resigned and said that the army would not "abandon the will of the people."

Morsi declared, in a late-night television address, that he would "defend the legitimacy of his elected office with his life". He added that "there is no substitute for legitimacy" as he vowed not to resign. Morsi accused supporters of Hosni Mubarak of exploiting the wave of protests to topple the government and fight democracy. SCAF leaders also issued a statement entitled "The Final Hours" in which they said that the military is willing to shed its blood "to protect the people against terrorists and fools" following Morsi's refusal to step down from his elected office.

On 3 July, unknown gunmen opened fire on a pro-Morsi rally in Cairo, killing 16 and wounding 200. As the 16:35 deadline set by the army approached, military leaders met for emergency talks with the army expected to issue a statement when the deadline passes. Mohamed El-Baradei, who was chosen to represent the National Salvation Front, was also said to have met army chief General Abdul Fatah al-Sisi. On 3 July, just before the deadline approached, Morsi offered to form a consensus government. An army statement read: "The General Command of the Armed Forces is currently meeting with a number of religious, national, political and youth icons...There will be a statement issued from the General Command as soon as they are done." At the same time the Freedom and Justice Party's senior leader, Waleed al-Haddad, said: "We do not go to invitations (meetings) with anyone. We have a president and that's it."

The head of the Egyptian Armed Forces and Defense Minister Abdul Fatah al-Sisi spoke at night from Cairo and said that the army was standing apart from the political process but was using its vision as the Egyptian people were calling for help and discharged its responsibility. Morsi was removed from power, the draft constitution was suspended and Chief Justice Adli Mansour was named interim president. Mohammed el-Baradei says the roadmap was to rectify the issues of the revolution. The Grand Sheikh of Al Azhar Ahmed el-Tayeb, the Coptic Pope Tawadros II as well as opposition leader Mohamed El Baradei and a youth member of the Tamarod movement, who were present during the statement, spoke in support of the 3 July coup. The move led to continuous civil unrest in Egypt until the present day.

== See also ==
- 2011 Egyptian Revolution
- 2005-2006 Egyptian protests
