= Egyptian Crisis (2011–2014) =

State crisis between 2011 and 2014

The Egyptian Crisis (Egyptian Arabic: الأزمة المصرية, romanized: al-ʾazma al-Maṣriyya) was a period of political instability that began with the 2011 Egyptian revolution and ended with the presidency of Abdel Fattah el-Sisi in 2014. It was a tumultuous three-year period of political and social unrest, characterized by mass protests, a series of popular elections, deadly clashes, and military reinforcement. The events have had a lasting effect on the country's current course, its political system and its society.

In 2011, hundreds of thousands of Egyptians took to the streets in an ideologically and socially diverse mass protest movement that ultimately ousted longtime president Hosni Mubarak. A protracted political crisis ensued, with the Supreme Council of the Armed Forces taking control of the country until the 2012 presidential election brought Mohamed Morsi, the former Muslim Brotherhood leader, into power as the first democratically elected president of Egypt. However, ongoing disputes between the Muslim Brotherhood and secularists led to anti-government protests and ultimately culminated in the 3 July 2013 coup d'état against Morsi, led by chief General Abdel Fattah el-Sisi. The military move deepened the political schism and led to a crackdown by security forces, resulting in the killing of over a thousand of Morsi's supporters. In 2014, Abdel Fattah el-Sisi eventually won the presidential election in a landslide victory, criticized by international observers as lacking democratic standards.

During these years of political turmoil, the authority of the state had been threatened, but never collapsed. The demands of the protesters, including, but not limited to: bread, freedom, dignity, and democracy, have not been met. The military became further anchored in Egypt's politics and a maximal repression of revolutionary practices took place under Sisi's regime.

== Background ==
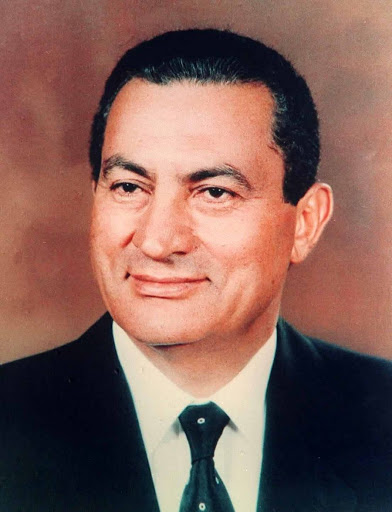
Hosni Mubarak

During his presidency, Hosni Mubarak pursued policies similar to those of his predecessor Anwar Sadat, including the adoption of a neoliberal model corrupted by cronyism and a continued commitment to the Camp David Accords. He also continued the reduction of the military's influence in Egyptian politics by gradually clearing the ministries of military elites. The Mubarak regime increasingly relied on police forces administered by the Ministry of Interior to manage public dissent. Economic liberalization programs reduced the roles of both the state and the military in the economy, leading to a drastic decrease in defense expenditures by 2010. Moreover, Mubarak positioned his son, Gamal Mubarak, as his successor instead of a military officer. Although this gradual reshuffling of power led to tensions between Mubarak's government and the military, his regime was considered stable by experts and its collapse had not been anticipated.

Mubarak's authoritarian rule was characterized by the tight control and repression of sociopolitical opposition. Civil society groups constantly clashed and bargained with the state over their place in public politics. Although being rigorously monitored, political parties, elections, local democratic reforms, protests, administrative courts, and associations were increasingly tolerated as forms of political activity since the 2000s.

The ever-increasing discontent among Egyptian citizens with the authoritarian regime originated in various concerns, ranging from the regime's brutal policing and its use of violence and torture, to corruption and election fraud. Increasing poverty and high unemployment compounded the resentment against Mubarak. After being nearly three decades in power, Mubarak was ousted following 18 days of demonstrations across the country during the Egyptian revolution of 2011.

== History ==
=== Events ===
==== 2011 Egyptian revolution ====
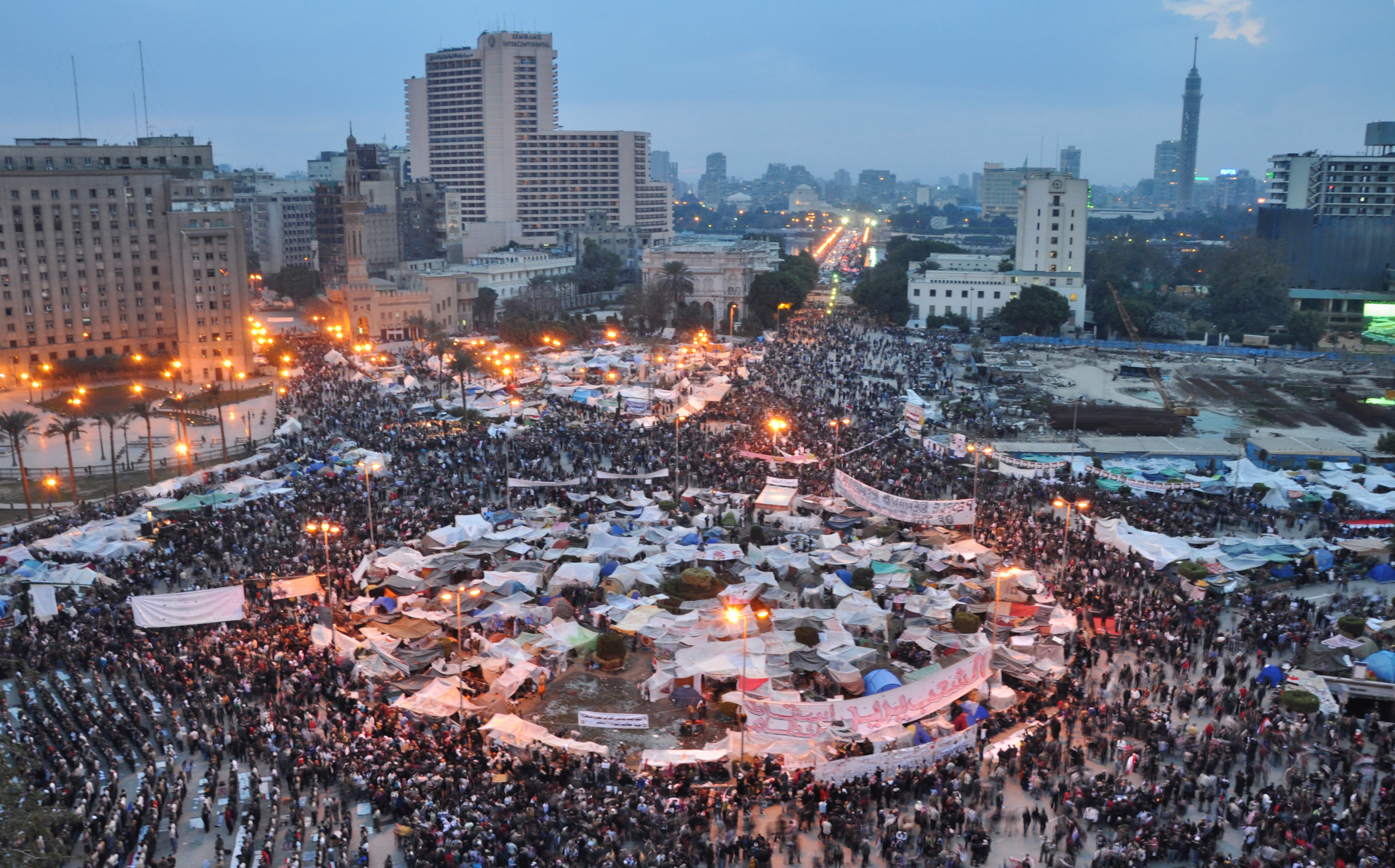
Tahrir Square protesters on 9 February

The public resentment against the autocratic leadership of President Hosni Mubarak erupted into mass protests in late January 2011, following the Tunisian revolution that overthrew President Ben Ali in mid-January. Hundreds of thousands of Egyptians occupied several public places across Egypt, with Cairo's Tahrir Square as the hub of the anti-government protests. Their demands were diverse but typically included dignity, bread, freedom, democracy, and social justice.

The police and demonstrators clashed violently; the killing of three protestors remarkably deviated from the harsh but non-lethal repression the police usually deployed. Initially, the government took a hard line by using riot-control tactics and shutting down the internet and telecom networks, which in turn intensified the protests. On 28 January 2011, Mubarak ordered the deployment of the army as the embattled police forces collapsed, leading to "the largest policing failure in Egypt's history". In a bid to accommodate the public, Mubarak appointed Omar Suleiman to the long-vacant office of vice president on 29 January, and soon after dissolved his cabinet. Later, he announced that he would not seek re-election and promised constitutional reforms, but refused to step down. As none of these concessions satisfied protesters, the crowds on the streets grew and international pressure on Mubarak increased. The army refrained from suppressing the protests as they no longer supported Mubarak's rule.

On 11 February 2011, Mubarak resigned as president and handed over power to the Supreme Council of the Armed Forces "to manage the affairs of the country". Besides ending his nearly 30-year authoritarian rule, the nationwide protests marked an unprecedented event in Egypt's history, as it successfully mobilized people from different socioeconomic backgrounds and merged them into one coalition against the government. The 18-day uprising left at least 846 civilians killed and more than 6,400 injured, according to a report commissioned by the Morsi regime. Human rights activists have been calling for a serious investigation of the real number of revolution victims, as "the total number of casualties could be far higher".

==== Transition under the SCAF regime ====
Following Hosni Mubarak's resignation on 11 February 2011, the Supreme Council of the Armed Forces (SCAF) under Field Marshal Mohamed Hussein Tantawi assumed control of the country. The SCAF suspended the 1971 constitution and dissolved the parliament, tightening its grip over both legislative and executive power. Free elections were to be organized within six months. The interim military rule was fully backed internationally, and, at least initially, well received by the public as a caretaker government, guaranteeing a rapid transition toward democracy. The public support for the military regime appeared from the constitutional referendum on 19 March 2011, in which 77.2% of voters approved the constitutional reforms proposed by the SCAF. The constitutional amendments, although objected by many liberal revolutionaries, included the judicial supervision of elections, limited the presidential powers, and required the newly elected parliament to write a new constitution.

However, the popular support for the military started to crumble and different civilian groups called for the end of military rule during renewed mass protests. Legislative elections were held from November 2011 to January 2012 and led to a victory of Islamist parties, with the Muslim Brotherhood's Freedom and Justice Party occupying the majority of parliamentary seats and the Salafist's al-Nour Party winning another quarter of the seats. Subsequently, the presidential election was held in May and June 2012, and has been considered by many as the first free presidential election in Egypt's history. A ruling by the Supreme Constitutional Court, declaring the legislative election unconstitutional, led to the dissolution of the newly elected parliament in June 2012, just before the final round of the presidential election. Moreover, on 17 June 2012, the last day of the presidential election, the SCAF released a constitutional declaration that significantly limited the power of the next president and considerably extended the political power of the military officials. These actions were a blow to the Muslim Brotherhood, which denounced it as a coup, and further consolidated the military's role as powerbroker in the post-Mubarak period.

==== Presidency of Mohamed Morsi ====
In June 2012, Mohamed Morsi won the presidential election with 51.7% of the vote in a run-off against army-backed candidate Ahmed Shafik, who served under Mubarak as prime minister. Morsi, a leading member of the Muslim Brotherhood and the Freedom and Justice Party, resigned from both organizations and was sworn in as Egypt's first civilian president on 30 June 2012. However, Morsi's presidency was brief and short-lived, facing massive protests for and against his rule, only to be ousted in a military coup in July 2013. In August 2012, Morsi replaced Hussein Tantawi as Minister of Defense with Abdel Fattah el-Sisi, then chief of the military intelligence. The drafting of a new constitution, considered a central element in the country's transition toward democracy, was criticized for the dominance of Islamist factions in the process and deeply divided the involved political factions. The withdrawal of secular and Coptic Christian stakeholders resulted in a draft constitution almost entirely written by Islamist parties. On 22 November 2012, Morsi granted himself the power to protect the constitutional process from dissolution by the court, and the power to legislate without judicial oversight, until a new parliament would be elected. While these unilateral actions led to massive protests and violent action throughout the country, Morsi submitted the draft constitution to a referendum in which 63.8% voted in favor, despite a low turnout of 32.9% of the electorate. The new constitution was then signed into law, which made it legally binding.

Morsi's regime was contested by a constellation of forces comprising the military, the security forces, the judiciary, and secularists, in what has been described as a "not-so-secret" parallel government aiming at its overthrow. Disagreement over the constitutional process, Morsi's perceived incompetence, internal problems within the Brotherhood, and the failure to deal with some of the country's main issues, such as shortages of basic necessities, further challenged his rule. In February 2013, the Salafists also withdrew their support from the president, and soon after, public resentment erupted into a campaign calling for his resignation and nation-wide demonstrations.

==== 2013 protests and military coup ====
In April 2013, a grassroots movement known as Tamarod, or "rebellion", claimed to have collected 20 million signatures in a petition calling for new presidential elections and the suspension of the new constitution. The independence of Tamarod has been questioned, as its campaign was allegedly supported and funded by the SCAF and the security forces. On 30 June 2013, the first anniversary of Morsi's inauguration was marked by mass demonstrations for, but mostly against Morsi, in which thousands of protesters surrounded the Heliopolis presidential palace demanding the resignation of Morsi. The military drew on the public resentment by issuing a 48-hour ultimatum that forced Morsi to reach a compromise with his opponents, but the president did not give in and insisted that he was the legitimate leader.

The military has been accused of exaggerating the size of the anti-Morsi protests, claiming figures of 15 and 17 million of protesters, up to 30 million. Independent observers have set the crowd scale at 1 to 2 million. On 3 July 2013, the Egyptian Armed Forces, headed by Abdel Fattah el-Sisi, acted on its 48-hour ultimatum by carrying out a popularly supported coup d'état ousting President Mohamed Morsi. In one day, the generals subsequently removed Morsi from office and imprisoned him, suspended the constitution, appointed Adly Mansour, chief justice of the Supreme Constitutional Court, as interim president, and called for early elections.

==== Post-coup unrest ====
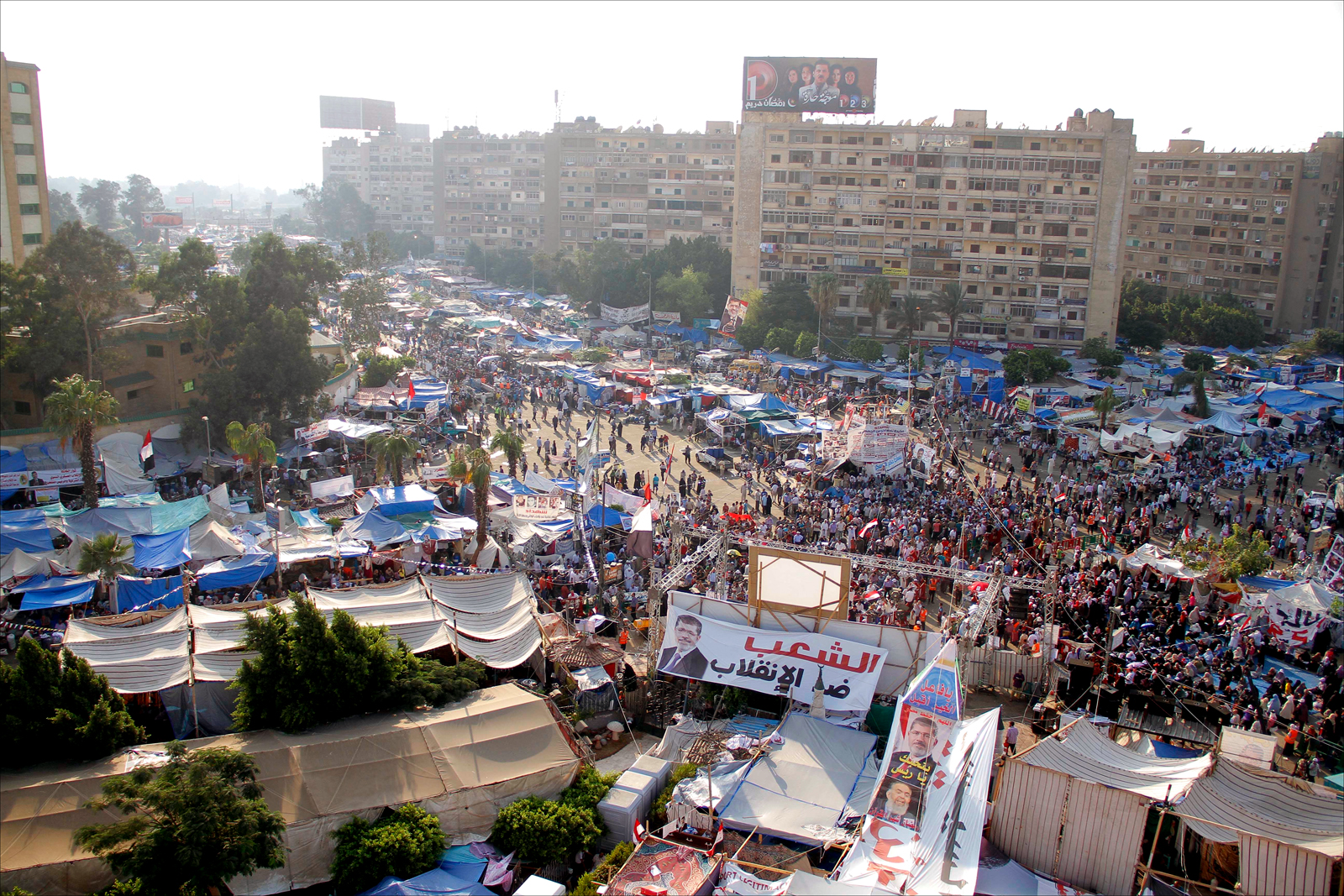
Rabaa al-Adaweya Square packed with anti-coup supporters.

The military coup triggered violent clashes between the military and Morsi supporters. Pro-Morsi protesters amassed near the Rabia Al-Adawiya Mosque, originally to celebrate the one-year anniversary of Morsi's presidency, but in the wake of his removal, they called for his return to power and condemned the military. Following the coup, security forces violently suppressed pro-Morsi demonstrations, culminating in five separate incidents of mass killings, including the killing of 61 protestors at the Republican Guard headquarters on 8 July 2013. On 14 August 2013, security forces raided the pro-Morsi sit-ins at al-Nahda Square and Rabaa al-Adawiya Square, resulting in a massacre of at least 900 protesters. Human Rights Watch denounced the aggressive crackdown on mostly peaceful protesters as "serious violations of international human rights" and are most likely crimes against humanity. Subsequent violence led to the death of hundreds more people. The interim military government declared the state of emergency and a curfew, that ultimately lasted three months.

On 24 March 2014, an Egyptian court sentenced 529 suspected members of the Muslim Brotherhood to death, accused of attacking a police station. Since the coup, approximately 60,000 people have been arrested or charged by the Egyptian authorities, which mainly targeted the Muslim Brotherhood.

==== 2014 election of Abdel Fattah el-Sisi ====
General Abdel Fattah el-Sisi, who led the military coup against President Mohamed Morsi, emerged as a popular figure in Egypt, and he eventually ran for presidency in the 2014 elections. In late May 2014, el-Sisi won in a landslide victory with 96.9% of the vote. His only rival was Hamdeen Sabahi in an election that was boycotted by Islamists and many political parties, including the Muslim Brotherhood and many liberal and secular groups. The election saw a voter turnout of 47.5%, lower than the 52% turnout in the 2012 presidential election, prompting the interim government to extend the vote last-minute with a third day. The electoral process and the outcome was denounced by observers as violating democratic rules. Analysts compared the election outcome to the Mubarak era, in which similar numbers of support for Mubarak were reported during periodic elections and referendums. Nonetheless, el-Sisi's election was widely recognized internationally. Domestically, hundreds of his supporters celebrated the victory in Cairo's Tahrir Square amid a deeply divided society.

== Impact ==
=== Counterrevolution ===
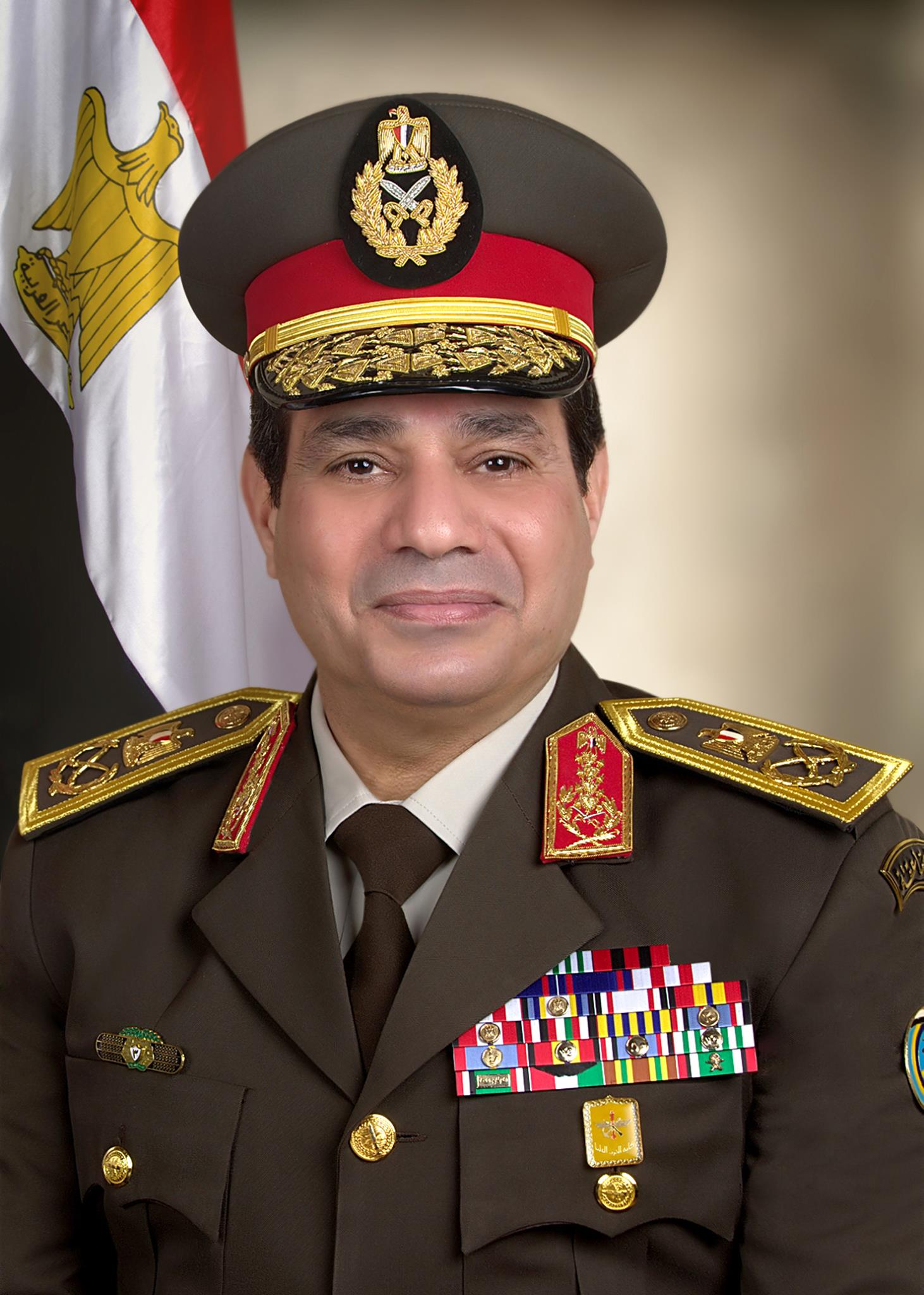
Field Marshal Abdel Fattah el-Sisi as Minister of Defense, 2014

In the period between 2011 and 2014, multiple power centers, including the military, the Muslim Brotherhood and secularists, emerged and competed for power. However, the military permanently played a key role throughout the different events that constituted this juncture. The army's generals carefully sought to manage each episode, and succeeded in maintaining power despite the country's political transitions. In fact, the military had always dominated Egypt's politics since the establishment of the first republic in 1952. With the installation of President el-Sisi, who removed Morsi in a military coup, the military's political and economic grip on the state has been fully consolidated in what has been called "a counterrevolutionary regime". Meanwhile, there has been a maximal repression of the Muslim Brotherhood and other opposition groups. Any form of public dissent, including the right to protest and freedom of the press, is strongly restricted by Sisi's repressive regime. Human rights organizations have accused Sisi's authoritarian regime of using torture and enforced disappearances to crush political opponents and criminal suspects.

Sisi's regime is not simply a continuation of Mubarak's repressive rule, but a regime aiming at the eradication of all the revolutionary elements that developed during Mubarak's final years and have thrived since the 2011 uprisings. Sisi's policy of counterrevolution led many analysts to evaluate the Egyptian revolution as a "failed revolution". However, critics of this view have assessed the period between 2011 and 2014 from a different perspective. It is argued that this period began without clear revolutionary intentions and has been terminated without a revolutionary outcome. Therefore, this turbulent period has also been described as a "revolutionary situation", an "authoritarian breakdown", a "constitutional revolution", and, as a "revolutionary process" followed by "two waves of counterrevolution". The discussion relates to broader reflections on the Arab Spring, described by Asef Bayat as "political upheavals that were both revolutionary and non-revolutionary".

=== Socio-economic impact ===
In the years since the 2011 revolution, the Egyptian economy suffered from a severe downturn. The post-revolutionary governments faced numerous economic challenges while none of the governments met the demands of the people, such as high unemployment, crony capitalism, and widening income gaps. Political and institutional uncertainty, a perception of rising insecurity and sporadic unrest continued to negatively affect Egypt's economic situation. Since 2011, the government deficit was supplemented with an additional 10% every year, and the country's domestic and foreign debt stood well beyond 100% of the GDP in 2015. Tourism, crucial to Egypt's economy as one of its main sources of revenue, sharply dropped between 2010 and 2015 by an estimated 50%.

When Abdel Fattah el-Sisi took power in June 2014, reviving the economy was one of his main priorities. His government pushed through a range of economic reforms, such as cutting food and energy subsidies and raising taxes. One of his most important economic projects was the completion of a new Suez canal in 2015. However, economic decline only exacerbated Egypt's high rate of unemployment, most visibly in extreme youth unemployment, which stood at more than 40% in 2016. Additionally, an important part of the population has been deployed in the informal economy, which complicates the provision of accurate data. By 2016, inflation and living costs heavily increased, pushing millions of people into poverty. Data from 2016 indicates that "an estimated twenty million Egyptians are living at or below the poverty level", including the lack of access to basic needs, health care and education.

=== Sinai insurgency ===
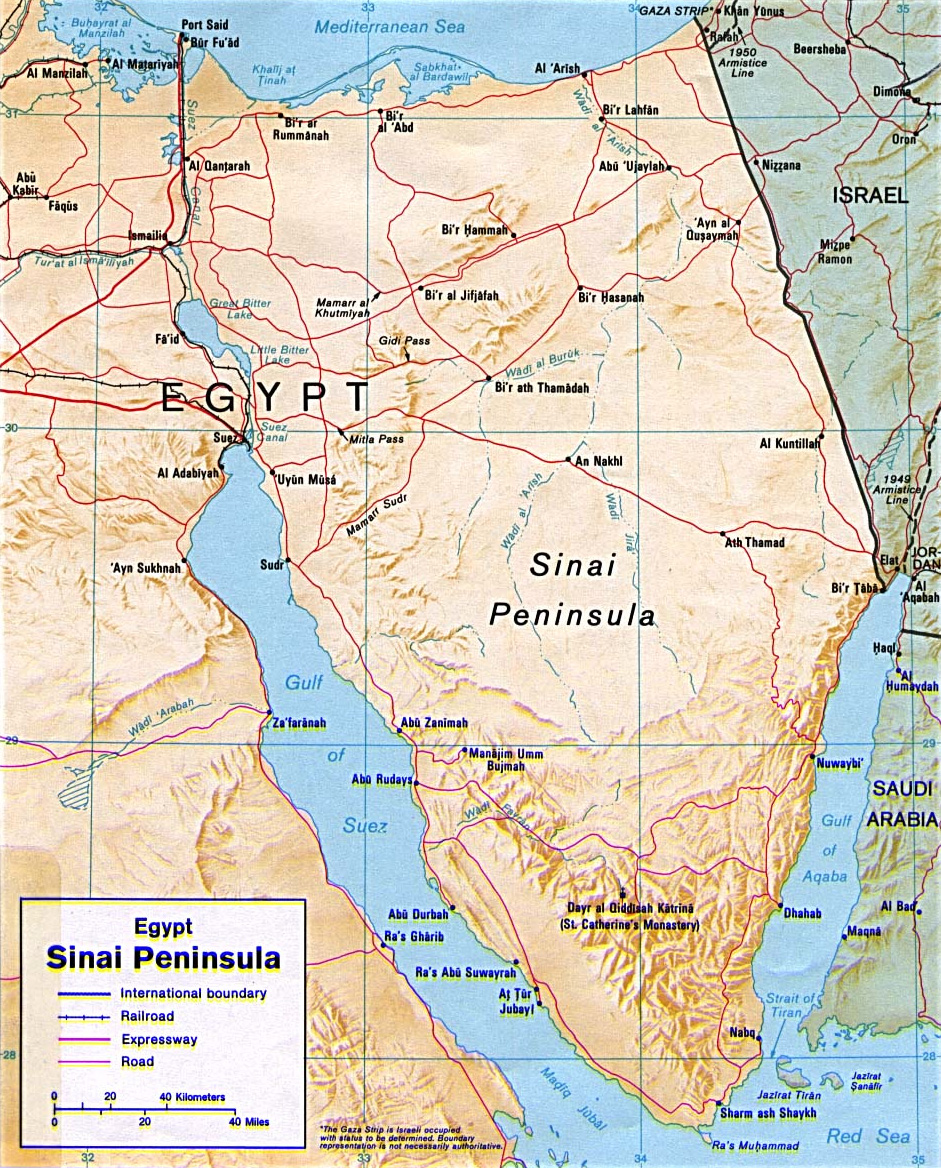
Map of the Sinai Peninsula

Since the 2011 collapse of the Mubarak regime, a security vacuum emerged in the Sinai Peninsula which turned it into a site of violent insurgency. Initially, the insurgency involved mainly local Bedouin tribesmen who saw the revolution as an opportunity to oppose the regime's discrimination and to assert their authority in the region. Islamist militants, present in the Sinai with various setbacks since the mid-1970s, exploited the country's unstable situation to launch several attacks on Egyptian security forces. Two military campaigns, Operation Eagle of the interim SCAF-regime in 2011, and Operation Sinai of the newly elected Morsi regime in 2012, were not successful in eliminating the militant groups from the peninsula. The removal of Morsi and the brutal repression of pro-Morsi protesters in 2013 further intensified the militants' activities. A wave of attacks on Egyptian security personnel prompted the military to a harsh crackdown on the Islamist militant groups.

In 2014, the most powerful militia in the Sinai, Ansar Bait al-Maqdis, pledged allegiance to the Islamic State and formed their own branch of Islamic State in the Sinai Province. They claimed responsibility over an attack in which more than 30 Egyptian soldiers were killed, being marked as the deadliest assault on security forces since 2011. Multiple major offensives by the Egyptian army since 2014 crushed neither the Bedouin militants nor the jihadi groups. As a reaction to the aggressive political and military measures, their insurgent actions became bolder, with waves of attacks in 2015, 2016, and 2017 on the army, Coptic Christians, and the Sufi community in the region. Their actions included the downing of a Russian passenger plane on 31 October 2015, killing all 224 aboard.

== See also ==
- Arab Spring
- 2011 Egyptian revolution
- History of republican Egypt
- History of Egypt under Hosni Mubarak
- Abdel Fattah el-Sisi
