= Timeline of the Egyptian Crisis under Mohamed Morsi =

Egyptian Crisis (third wave)
- Part of Egyptian crisis
- Date: 30 June 2012 – 22 November 2012
- Location: Egypt; 30°2′N 31°13′E
- Caused by: Mohamed Morsi's decree that immunised his actions from any legal challenge
- Goals: Withdrawal of Morsi's decree; Cancellation of referendum on draft constitution; Overhaul of the Islamist-dominated constitutional assembly
- Methods: Civil disobedience; Civil resistance; Demonstrations; Strike actions; Online activism

Parties
(Egypt) Egyptian opposition	Government of Egypt: Egyptian police; Egyptian Army; Muslim Brotherhood: Freedom and Justice Party

Lead figures
Abdel Fatah al-Sisi (Commander-in-chief of the Egyptian Army) Mohammed ElBaradei(Opposition leader)	Mohammed Morsi (President of Egypt) Mohammed Badie (Supreme Guide of the Muslim Brotherhood) Hesham Qandil (Prime Minister of Egypt) Mohamed al-Guindi (Minister of Justice)

Casualties and losses
34 killed	

The following is a chronological summary of the major events that occurred after the Egyptian Revolution of 2011, after Mohamed Morsi's election as the fifth President of Egypt, on 30 June 2012. This article documents the third wave of the Egyptian Crisis.

== Post-Morsi's election ==
=== 2012 ===
==== July ====
On 8 July, Mohamed Morsi issued a decree calling back into session the dissolved parliament for 10 July 2012. Morsi's decree also called for new parliamentary elections to be held within 60 days of the adoption of a new constitution for the country, which is tentatively expected for late 2012. A constitutional assembly selected by the erstwhile parliament has been formed and has begun the work of drafting the constitution. The Supreme Council of the Armed Forces (SCAF) hold an emergency meeting in response to the decree, but adjourn the meeting without making an announcement.

On 9 July, Egyptian President Mohammed Mursi's order to reconvene parliament was rejected by Egypt's Supreme Constitutional Court which said after meeting on 9 July 2012 that all its rulings and decisions, including its judgement that part of the election for parliament was unconstitutional and which led in return to the assembly's dissolution by the SCAF, are final, not subject to appeal and binding for all state institutions. With its ruling the court asserted that Morsi had no right to reconvene parliament after the court ordered it dissolved in June 2012. Though the constituent assembly tasked with drawing up Egypt's new constitution is currently functioning, after being selected by the dissolved parliament, the SCAF also gave itself the power to choose a new assembly if the current one runs into any problems according to Al Jazeera. In its 2012-07-09 statement the military council said its constitutional declaration which gave it broad powers "came as a result of the political, legal and constitutional circumstances that the country was facing" and added that the declaration "ensures the continuity of state institutions and the [military council] until a new constitution is drafted". The military said it was "confident" that all state institutions will respect constitutional declarations.

On 10 July, Egypt's parliament convened despite dissolution, but the session was adjourned by Speaker Saad al-Katatni after the members of parliament approved Katatni's proposal that the parliament seek legal advice from the Court of Cassation on how to implement the supreme court's ruling. Thousands gathered in Cairo in protest of a ruling by Egypt's Supreme Constitutional Court to freeze the decree issued by President Mohamed Morsi to reinstate the Islamist-led parliament. While the Supreme Constitutional Court ruled that Morsi did not have the right to reconstitute the body, it also threatened the new president with the equivalent of contempt of court if he continued to reject its decisions. Parliament asked Egypt's Court of Cassation to essentially overrule the aspect of the Supreme Constitutional Court's decision holding that the whole Parliament must be immediately dissolved because of flaws in the electoral system used to fill a third of the seats. The Administrative Court (whose function is the review of executive actions), besides the Supreme Constitutional Court (whose function is the review of statutes) and Court of Cassation (whose function is the handling of appeals of lower court rulings) one of the three highest Courts in Egypt, is also weighing that question and has said it will issue its own ruling on 17 July.

On 11 July, Egypt's President Mohamed Morsi declared he will seek dialogue with political forces and judicial authorities to resolve the row over the dissolved parliament. He also said that he will respect Egypt's Supreme Constitutional Court ruling that blocked his decision to call the nation's parliament back into session.

On 14 July, the parliament's request to examine Egypt's Supreme Constitutional Court ruling that dissolved the Islamist-led assembly was rebuffed by the Court of Cassation. Egypt's highest appeals court unanimously ruled on 14 July 2012 it has no jurisdiction over the implementation of 14 June 2012 constitutional court ruling.

On 16 July, more than 20000 workers at Egypt's largest textiles manufacturing company, which saw major strikes in 2006 and 2008, began their first day of strikes demanding an increase in wages and more government investment in their sector.

On 19 July, the Administrative Judiciary Court of the State Council put on hold all appeals against the formulation of the Constituent Assembly, tasked with drafting a new constitution, until the court decides on 30 July 2012 on suits calling for a change of the judge presiding over the case. The court was also looking at a case filed against the supplementary constitutional decree released by the Supreme Council of Armed Forces days before President Mohamed Morsi's inauguration, and another against the president's decision to bring back the People's Assembly, parliament's lower house that SCAF dissolved after the Supreme Constitutional Court ruled the parliamentary elections law unconstitutional. The court ruled lack of jurisdiction on both cases and referred the latter back to the Supreme Constitutional Court. Egyptian president Mohamed Morsi ordered to release 572 people detained by the Egyptian military in the 2011 protests, and reduced the sentence of 16 others from life sentence to seven years in jail.

On 30 July, the Administrative Judiciary Court of the State Council ruled on 30 July to postpone the case calling for the dissolution of the Constituent Assembly to 24 September, giving the assembly enough time to complete the drafting of Egypt's new constitution.

==== August ====
On 2 August, the first Cabinet under President Mohamed MorsI headed by Prime Minister Hesham Qandil was sworn in.

On 5 August, 2012 Egyptian–Israeli border attack. Following this event Egypt's President Morsi fired his intelligence chief, the head of the military police, several Interior Ministry officials, the head of the presidential guard and the governor of North Sinai, while the President during a trip to the border region vowed with respect to the victims of the attack. "We will never, ever rest until we take revenge and bring back justice to those killed."

On 8 August, following the 2012 Egyptian–Israeli border attack Egyptian forces launched aerial strikes on militants in response to a series of attacks by masked gunmen on military checkpoints as part of a broader operation against Islamist militant organizations in the Sinai Peninsula.

On 12 August, Morsi asked Mohamad Hussein Tantawi, head of the country's armed forces, and Sami Anan, the Army chief of staff, to resign and Morsi assumed legislative powers. Morsi's spokesman, Yasser Ali, announced that both Tantawi and Anan would remain advisers to the president. Tantawi and Anan were kept on as "special counsels to the president" with undisclosed roles and were given Egypt's highest state honour, the Grand Collar of the Nile. Morsi named Abdul Fatah al-Sisi, currently serving as chief of military intelligence, as Egypt's new defense minister. He also replaced Egypt Chief of Staff Lieutenant General Sami Hafez Anan with General Sedki Sobhi. General Mohamed al-Assar, a member of the Supreme Council of the Armed Forces, was named an assistant defense minister. Morsi also pushed out the chiefs of the navy, the air force and the air defense branch of Egypt armed forces. More specifically Vice Admiral Mohab Mamish, Commander of the Egyptian Navy; Lieutenant General Abd El Aziz Seif-Eldeen, Commander of the Egyptian Air Defense Forces; and Air Marshal Reda Mahmoud Hafez, Commander of the Egyptian Air Force were relieved from duty and moved on to civilian roles. Morsi said his decisions had not been intended to humiliate military. "I never meant to antagonize anyone," Morsi said. "We go on to new horizons, with new generations, with new blood that has long been awaited." "I want the armed forces to devote themselves to a mission that is holy to all of us, which is protecting the nation," he said in a televised address. "The decisions I took today were not meant ever to target certain persons, nor did I intend to embarrass institutions, nor was my aim to narrow freedoms," he said. "I did not mean to send a negative message about anyone, but my aim was the benefit of this nation and its people." Morsi also announced that the constitutional amendments passed by the Supreme Council of the Armed Forces (SCAF) that had gutted the authority of his office, and replaced it with his own declaration, one that gave him broad legislative and executive powers and a decisive role in the drafting of Egypt's still unfinished new constitution. In addition Morsi appointed a senior judge and Muslim Brotherhood favorite, Mahmoud Mekki, as his vice president. The new constitutional decree Morsy released is made up of just four articles. Among the powers Morsi assumed are the power to select a new panel to write Egypt's constitution, if the current panel could finish its work, and the full power to author, approve, and promulgate legislation. This marked the "completion of Egyptian revolution," said an unidentified spokesman according to the Jerusalem Post. The New York Times described the move as an "upheaval" and a "stunning purge", given the power that SCAF had taken after the fall of Mubarak. Morsi's moves triggered support for and protest against his 12 August decisions, while legal experts questioned legitimacy of Morsi's constitutional changes and conflicting reports emerged from military officials over whether Morsi consulted with the armed forces regarding his decision to retire Tantawi and Anan. Al Jazeera described it as "escalating the power struggle" between the president and military.

On 14 August 2012, Mohamed Salem, an Egyptian lawyer, filed a legal challenge over Morsi's removal of Tantawi and Anan, arguing that Morsi planned to bring back the totalitarian regime.

On 23 August, Egyptian President Mohamed Morsi issued a new law cancelling the Mubarak-era practice of temporarily detaining journalists for so-called "publication offences," including the charge of "offending the president of the republic." With this law Morsi outlawed the pretrial detention of people accused of press crimes. A Constitutional Declaration issued by Morsi earlier in August 2012 gave the president full legislative powers, which he will command until the election of a new parliament.

==== September ====
On 8 September, The Administrative Court of the State Council postponed its decision on the constitutionality of Egypt's Constituent Assembly until 2 October 2012.

On 11 September, a protest was organized by Wesam Abdel-Wareth, a Salafist leader and president of Egypt's Hekma television channel, who called for a gathering at 5 pm in front of the United States Embassy, to protest against a film that he thought was named Muhammad's Trial. After the trailer for the film began circulating, Nader Bakkar, the Egyptian Salafist Nour Party's spokesman, and Muhammad al-Zawahiri, the brother of al-Qaeda leader Ayman al Zawihiri, called for Egyptians to assemble outside of the American embassy. About 3,000 demonstrators, many of them from the ultraconservative Salafist movement, responded to his call. A dozen men were then reported to have scaled the embassy walls, after which one of them tore down the flag of the United States and replaced it with a black Islamist flag with the inscription of the shahada: "There is no god but God and Muhammad is the messenger of God". Some of the protesters also wrote "There is no God but Allah" on the compound walls. According to Sherine Tadros of Al Jazeera, the protestors demanded that the film be taken "out of circulation" and that some of the protestors would stay at the site until that happens. Thousands of Egyptian riot police were at the embassy following the breach of the walls; they eventually persuaded the trespassers to leave the compound without the use of force. After that, only a few hundred protesters remained outside the compound. Egypt's prime minister Hesham Kandil said "a number" of protesters later confessed to getting paid to participate.

On 14 September, in the town of Sheikh Zuwayed in the Sinai Peninsula, protesters stormed a compound of the Multinational Force and Observers, designed to monitor the peace treaty between Egypt and Israel. The peacekeeping force opened fire on the protesters. Two members of the peacekeeping force were wounded. Ahmad Fouad Ashoush, a Salafist Muslim cleric, issued a fatwa saying: "I issue a fatwa and call on the Muslim youth in America and Europe to do this duty, which is to kill the director, the producer and the actors and everyone who helped and promoted the film." Another Muslim cleric, Ahmed Abdullah (aka Abu Islam) tore up the Bible and threw the torn pages on the ground during 11 September embassy attack.

On 22 September, Egypt's Supreme Administrative Court upheld on 22 September upheld an earlier Supreme Constitutional Court ruling, which had ordered the dissolution of the lower house of Egypt's parliament (People's Assembly) based on the unconstitutionality of some of the parliamentary elections law. The administrative court said that since the electoral laws on which the People's Assembly was elected were found to be unconstitutional, the entire composition of the assembly is invalid.

On 23 September, Egypt's Supreme Administrative Court issued on 23 September 2012 a verdict supporting the right of former members of the now-defunct National Democratic Party (NDP), which was formally disbanded by an administrative court in April 2011, the NDP to run in parliamentary elections.

==== October ====
On 1 October, Egypt's doctors began on Monday a partial strike that lasted for weeks.

On 2 October, The Administrative Court of the State Council postponed its decision on the constitutionality of Egypt's Constituent Assembly until 9 October 2012.

On 8 October, Egyptian president Mohamed Morsi has ordered pardon for all persons who already have convictions and those who are still under investigation or are on trial for deeds "committed with the aim of supporting the revolution and bringing about its objectives." The decree included felonies, misdemeanors committed to support the uprising to achieve its goals from 25 January 2011 until 30 June 2012 except crimes of first degree murder and abides the general prosecutor and the military attorney general, each one in his field to publish a list for those given amnesty in the official newspaper. The persons missed can submit a complaint in a month from the date of publication, and one or more committees will be formed to consider the complaints under the presidency of the head of court of cessation within thirty days of the date of the complaints.

On 9 October, The Administrative Court of the State Council postponed its decision on the constitutionality of Egypt's Constituent Assembly until 16 October 2012 in order to review more documents.

On 10 October, Egypt's prosecutor general Abdel-Maguid Mahmoud failed to win a conviction of two dozen Mubarak allies charged with orchestrating an attack by thugs on the protesters who ousted Mubarak. Some of the thugs were mounted, and the resulting melee became known as 2 February 2011 Battle of the Camels where men riding horses and camels charged into crowds on Cairo's Tahrir Square, setting off two days of clashes that ended with killing of nearly a dozen people. Activist groups and political parties called for a nationwide protest on 12 October 2011 after a court acquitted all 24 people charged with involvement in the Battle of Camels.

On 11 October, Despite the fact that Egyptian law protects the prosecutor general from being ousted by the president, president Morsi ordered Egypt's prosecutor general Abdel-Maguid Mahmoud to leave his position as prosecutor general to defuse public anger over acquittals in the Battle of the Camels case. Mahmoud however refused to step down and become Egypt's ambassador to the Vatican, as the law gave immunity to the prosecutor general from being ousted by the president.

On 12 October, Critics and supporters of Egyptian President Mohamed Morsi clashed in Cairo's Tahrir Square on 12 October 2012 in a small but potent rally, as liberal and secular activists erupted with anger accusing the Muslim Brotherhood of trying to take over the country. The rally sharpened the nation's tensions over its political direction and the failure to bring loyalists of the former government to justice for their actions during Battle of the Camels The clashes erupted between two competing rallies in Tahrir. One was by liberal and secular activists to criticize Morsi's failure to achieve promises he had made for first 100 days in power and to demand greater diversity on the panel tasked with writing Egypt's new constitution, the other had been called by Morsi's Muslim Brotherhood to call for judicial reforms and to support the move by Morsi on 11 October 2012 to remove the prosecutor-general. The secular camp accused the Brotherhood of holding the gathering to "hijack" the square from their anti-Morsi protest. The violence erupted when Morsi supporters stormed a stage set up by the rival camp, angered by chants they perceived as insults to the president.

On 13 October, Egypt's president Morsi backed down on 13 October 2012 from his decision to remove the country's top prosecutor Abdel-Maguid Mahmoud, keeping him in his post and sidestepping a potential clash with the country's powerful judiciary. The two-day standoff between President Mohammed Morsi and Prosecutor General Abdel-Meguid Mahmoud escalated with a backlash from a powerful group of judges who said Morsi's move had infringed upon their authority and on the judiciary's independence. Egypt's Vice President Mahmoud Mekki told reporters after meeting the prosecutor that the president agreed to suspend the decision to make Mahmoud Egypt's ambassador to the Vatican following a request from the country's Supreme Judicial Council. Mekki said the presidency had announced the decision to make Mahmoud Egypt's ambassador to the Vatican after initially understanding that Mahmoud had agreed to step down as Prosecutor General. After meeting Morsi and his advisers, Mahmoud told The Associated Press that "a misunderstanding" had been resolved.

On 16 October, The Administrative Court of the State Council postponed its decision on the constitutionality of Egypt's Constituent Assembly until 23 October 2012.

On 23 October, Egypt's Supreme Administrative Court in Cairo referred the law regulating the Constituent Assembly to the Supreme Constitutional Court and hence suspended the hearing of lawsuits that sought the dissolution of the assembly charged with drafting the country's new constitution. Plaintiffs from 48 lawsuits demanded the dissolution of the Constituent Assembly claiming the assembly failed to proportionately represent various social sectors, and violated Egypt's interim constitution by including MPs as members. More specifically, the Administrative Court referred Law 79/2012, which granted the assembly immunity from dissolution, to the Supreme Constitutional Court, which will rule on the law based on the Constitutional Declaration that has governed the country since the fall of former President Hosni Mubarak. Egypt's parliament had approved the law on the same day of its formation two days before Parliament was dissolved. However, the Supreme Council of the Armed Forces refused to pass the law. After decreeing the return of the People's Assembly, President Mohamed Morsy approved the stalled law to prevent the dissolution of the Constituent Assembly. Judge Nazih Tangho of the High Administrative Court referred the case to the Constitutional Court to look into the law that gave the constitutional panel legal immunity, a clause he said needed vetting because no one should be above legal supervision. "The law was meant to prevent the High Administrative Court from looking into appeals ... against the panel," he said. Muslim Brotherhood lawyer Abdel Moneim Abdel Maqsoud stated that the Supreme Constitutional Court needed at least two months to rule on the case, citing the law that obliged it to consider the cases 45 days after its referral.

== Democratic transition ==
Under Morsi, Egyptians witnessed greater freedom compared to the Nasser, Sadat and Mubarak eras. For the first time since the creation of the position: President of Egypt, Morsi’s 2012 constitution ended the all power presidency and instituted a stronger parliament, ended the military’s right to detain civilians and abolished torture since its introduction by Gamal Abdel Nasser, though his constitution still sparked controversy as many claimed that it had tight Islamist features. Egypt also transitioned from decades of authoritarianism to hybridism, as the authoritarian elements that existed for decades were getting rid off and new democratic features were getting introduced. Finally, there was greater freedom of expression and the press was diverse in political views that consisted of: secularists, liberals and Islamists. People voiced their opinion with no fear and media activists criticized Morsi freely and didn’t suffer the consequences that opposition would have suffered under the Nasser, Sadat and Mubarak eras. A satire show El Bernameg which gained popularity after the 2011 revolution was hosted by Bassem Youssef that regularly made fun of Morsi and the Muslim Brotherhood government.

== See also ==
- Arab Spring
