= 2005–06 Egyptian protests =

The 2005-2006 Egyptian protests was a wave of protests and massive General strikes and opposition protests against president Hosni Mubarak and his cabinet, the military and the results of the 2005 Egyptian presidential election. Hundreds of thousands took to the streets for months in 2005, protesting the re-run of Hosni Mubarak and demanded the fall of the regime. The unrest and civil disturbances were mostly peaceful apart from some acts of civil violence during massive demonstrations in September, denouncing the results of the 2005 Egyptian presidential election. The protests continued into 2006, while massive journalist and artist protest movements were rocking Egypt. Worker protests and student demonstrations were also erupting along towns nationwide, protesting tuition fee hikes and Inflation. Pro-democratic opposition protests were also taking place in the first 4 months of 2006. In September, 10 were killed in clashes at protests against Corruption and cartoons. Unemployment and Poverty also led to massive labour protests across Egypt throughout October-December. A Massive labour uprising occurred in El Mahalla El Kubra in December, in which one was killed in the bloody clashes that followed the worker protests demanding better wages and more better living conditions in working places. A strike wave led to the deaths of 13 in 2007.

== See also ==
- 2011 Egyptian Revolution
- 2012-13 Egyptian protests
