= Rafik Habib =

Egyptian political researcher

- Born: Rafik Samuel Habib; 1959 (age 66–67); Minya, Egypt
- Education: Cairo University; Ain Shams University
- Occupations: Political researcher, analyst, author, politician

Rafik Habib (Arabic: رفيق حبيب; born in 1959) is an Egyptian political researcher, and analyst, sometimes described as a Coptic intellectual. He serves as Senior Director for IT & Decision Support of CEOSS, an Egyptian, development organization.

== Biography ==
Habib was born in 1959 in Minya, Upper Egypt. He was the son of Samuel Habib, an evangelical pastor of a mega-church who served as president of the Evangelical Denomination in Egypt for many years, from 1980 to 1997.

In 1982, Habib graduated from the Faculty of Arts, Department of Psychology at Cairo University. In 1988, he received his PhD in Psychology from Ain Shams University.

He said his first interaction with the Muslim Brotherhood was in 1989 when he began researching Islamist movements.

He was instrumental in the founding of the Al-Wasat Party, a moderate centrist, Islamist party, founded in 1996 and in July 2011, he was appointed deputy chairman of the Muslim Brotherhood's Freedom and Justice Party, which confused a lot of people given that he is Christian.

He was criticized by many for backing the Muslim Brotherhood. The Orthodox Coptic Pope, Pope Shenouda described him as being "an insurgent Protestant" and other people said he had converted to Islam.

He resigned from the position in December 2012- he was one of several advisers to Egyptian President Mohamed Morsi who resigned in the midst of the 2012 Egyptian protests.

In 2014, he predicted there would be a counter-coup. He maintains a personal homepage where he posts his views with links to his articles published to a website called Scribd.

== External references ==
- Rafik Habib webpage (in Arabic)
