= Hasan Shehata =

Egyptian Shia cleric

Hassan Shehata
- Born: 10 November 1946; Harbit, Markaz Abu Kabir, al-Sharqia Governorate, Egypt
- Died: 23 June 2013 (aged 66); Zawyat Abu Musalam, Giza Governorate, Egypt

Philosophical work
- Region: Egyptian Islamic scholar
- School: Shi'a Twelver

Hassan Bin Muhamad Bin Shehata Bin Mousa al-Anani, known as Sheikh Hassan Shehata (Arabic: حسن بن محمد بن شحاتة بن موسى العناني) (November 10, 1946 - June 23, 2013), was a scholar who was killed in the small village of Zawyat Abu Musalam in Giza

He studied at Egypt's al-Azhar University and in the 1970s, served as a prominent Sunni Imam to the Egyptian Army. According to his own account, after having a dream of Imam Ali and other sahaba, he converted to Shia Islam in the 1990s. In 2009, he spent some time in jail under the government of ousted Egyptian president Hosni Mubarak due to his speeches against radical, fundamentalist Sunni movements that he deemed harmed Islam. 306 of his followers were also detained along with him. In the lynching on June 23, 2013, an angry mob led by the country's Salafist sheikhs torched Shia residences in the small village of Zawyat Abu Musalam in Giza governorate, killing four citizens, including Shehata, a prominent cleric who was visiting one of the families in the village when the attack took place. He served as a prominent Shia cleric who had thousands of followers due to his views and his denouncement of extremist movements in Egypt. On June 13, 2015, an Egyptian court sentenced 23 people to 14 years in prison for the fatal lynching of four Shia men in the village of Abu Musallim. The court acquitted eight other defendants.

== See also ==
- Shia Islam in Egypt
