= Egyptian Judges' Club =

- Formation: 1939; 87 years ago
- Headquarters: Cairo, Egypt
- Members: 9,000
- Chairman: Judge Mohamed Abdel-Mohsen Mansour

The Egyptian Judges' Club (Nadi al Quda) was founded in Cairo, Egypt in 1939, primarily as a social club for judges. It is not formally registered as a professional association, as that would place it under the jurisdiction of Egypt's Ministry of Social Affairs and limit its independence, an outcome the club's members aim to avoid. It considers itself and acts as the de facto representative of Egypt's judges, and has a history of speaking out in favor of judicial independence and political democracy.

Any member of the Egyptian judiciary and any Egyptian prosecutor can join it. It has over 9,000 members, including over 90% of Egyptian judges.

== History ==
In the late 1960s, the Judges' Club criticized what it viewed as the disregard by the government of Egyptian President Gamel Abdel Nasser for the law. In August 1969, the Nasser government dissolved the board of the Judges' Club, announced that the president would appoint its officers, and dismissed over 200 judges in what the judiciary called the "Massacre of the Judges".

Subsequently, Egyptian President Anwar Sadat re-appointed the dismissed judges in 1973, and two years later the Judges' Club re-attained its autonomy. In the late 1970s, the Judges Club' issued statements in support of human rights improvements in Egypt, and greater respect by the government for the rule of law.

=== The 2012 Egyptian protests ===
On 22 November 2012, President Mohamed Morsi issued a decree that immunised his actions from any legal sanction. This and other concurrent acts led to the 2012 Egyptian protests, and the Judges Club called for a strike. In December 2012, Egyptian Prosecutor General Talaat Ibrahim Abdallah filed a complaint charging Judges Club head Ahmed al-Zend and leading opposition figures with espionage and inciting to overthrow the government.

Later in December 2012, when President Morsi called for a referendum to be held over the objections of protesters on a 2012 Draft Constitution of Egypt, al-Zend indicated that the Judges Club refused to supervise the referendum, saying:

More than 90 per cent of judges clubs all over Egypt will refrain from the supervision process ... Judges have always been at the forefront whenever we are called to perform any patriotic mission, however, this time it’s different. Most judges are refraining from monitoring the referendum because they have sensed severe violation of their authority as well as their independence.

On December 24, Al-Zind was attacked by around a dozen people who threw rocks at him as he left the club’s headquarters in downtown Cairo, injuring him and sending him to the hospital.

== Leadership ==
As of 2012, the Chairman of the Club was Judge Ahmed Zend.
