= Abu Musallam incident =

Abu Musallam attack
- Location: Abu Musallam, Giza, Egypt
- Date: 23 June 2013
- Target: Shiites
- Attack type: Stabbings/beatings/lynching
- Weapons: sticks rocks
- Deaths: 5 Shias
- Injuries: dozens
- Perpetrators: Sunnis (Salafists, Muslim Brotherhood)

The Abu Musallam incident was an event where a large group of 3000 people, including Salafist Muslims, killed a small group of Shias in their home in a suburb of Cairo on June 23 2013. Among the dead was sheikh Hassan Shehata who was a prominent religious figure among the Egyptian Shia community. Some news sources described the mob as "takfiris", while others described it as being a result of anti-Shia rhetoric steaming from sermons at Friday prayers.
