= Judiciary of Egypt =

Legal system of the Arab Republic of Egypt

The judicial system (or judicial branch) of Egypt is not independent of the executive under the authoritarian el-Sisi regime. The judicial system is formally an independent branch of the Egyptian government which includes both secular and religious courts, but is in practice controlled by the executive. The Egyptian judicial system is primarily based on French Civil Code and, to a lesser extent, upon other European codes and Islamic law.

The legal code in Egypt is largely derived from the Napoleonic Code, whose principles shaped the structure and organization of the law, influencing Egyptian reforms through core legal ideas; trained jurists played a key role in applying these principles locally, while legal texts served as guides for codifying and interpreting laws, and courts gradually adopted these rules in civil and commercial matters, helping to create a more consistent legal system and leaving a lasting impact on Egypt’s law.

Marriage and personal status are primarily based on the religious law of the individual concerned. Thus, there are three forms of family law in Egypt: Muslim, Christian, and Secular (based on the French family laws). The judicial branch plays an important role in the political process in Egypt, as the branch is given the responsibility to monitor and run the country's parliamentary and presidential elections.

== History ==
Starting in 1875, Egypt established National Courts and Mixed Courts, following the model of European judiciaries. The Egyptian judicial institution that existed in the mid 19th century was characterized by the following:

- Courts at that time were not entirely national, but rather there were courts for foreigners known as "consular courts".
- The judicial authority at that time was not the only authority entrusted with giving rulings on disputes, but rather there was another system that had enabled members of the executive authority to issue rulings in certain cases.
- Abandonment of the unified judicial system that had existed since the Ottoman rule of Egypt.

During the Ottoman era, the judiciary power was undertaken by one person known as the Chief Justice, who was assisted by four deputies representing the four schools of Islamic jurisprudence: Hanafi, Shafie, Maleki and Hanbali.
During Mohamed Ali's reign of Egypt and his endeavor to build a modern Egyptian state, two significant developments took place in Egypt, leading to the existence of various bodies of civil judiciary in the country.

== Criminal code ==
Egypt based its criminal codes and court operations primarily on British, Italian, and Napoleonic models. Criminal court procedures had been substantially modified by the heritage of Islamic legal and social patterns and the legacy of numerous kinds of courts that formerly existed. The divergent sources and philosophical origins of these laws and the inapplicability of many borrowed Western legal concepts occasioned difficulties in administering Egyptian law.

The criminal code listed three main categories of crime: contraventions (minor offenses), misdemeanors (offenses punishable by imprisonment or fines), and felonies (offenses punishable by penal servitude or death). Lower courts handled the majority of the cases that reached adjudication and levied fines in about nine out of ten cases. At their discretion, courts could suspend fines or imprisonment (when a sentence did not exceed one year).

Capital crimes that carried a possible death sentence included murder, manslaughter occurring in the commission of a felony, arson or the use of explosives that caused death, rape, treason, and endangerment of state security. Few convictions for capital crimes, however, resulted in execution.

Egypt's laws require that a detained person be brought before a magistrate and formally charged within forty-eight hours or released. An accused is entitled to post bail and had the right to be defended by legal counsel.

The Emergency Law of 1958 outlined special judicial procedures for some cases. The law enabled authorities to circumvent the increasingly independent regular court system in cases where people were charged with endangering state security. The law applied primarily to Islamic radicals but also covered leftists suspected of political violence, drug smugglers, and illegal currency dealers. It also allowed detention of striking workers, pro-Palestinian student demonstrators, and relatives of fugitives.

The Emergency Law of 1958 authorized the judicial system to detain people without charging them or guaranteeing them due process while an investigation was under way. After thirty days, a detainee could petition the State Security Court to review the case. If the court ordered the detainee's release, the minister of interior had fifteen days to object. If the minister overruled the court's decision, the detainee could petition another State Security Court for release after thirty more days. If the second court supported the detainee's petition, it released the detainee. The minister of interior could, however, simply re-arrest the detainee. The government commonly engaged in this practice in cases involving Islamic extremists.

== Civil code ==
The Egyptian Civil Code is the prime source of civil law, and has been the source of law and inspiration for numerous other Middle Eastern jurisdictions, including pre-dictatorship Libya and Iraq as well as Qatar. Egypt's Civil Code governs "the areas of personal rights, contracts, obligations, and torts." According to EgyptJustice.com, "due to the long court litigation delays caused by a crushing (and steadily growing) backlog of civil cases, plus weak mechanism for enforcing court judgments, large commercial disputes are often resolved through arbitration, as governed by the Arbitration Law (Law 27 of 1994)."

There are "two levels" of litigation (two trials of fact)" with another appellate level in civil litigation in Egypt.

- "Small claims cases are tried before a single judge, with a right to de novo appeal to a panel of three judges from the Court of First Instance."
- "Larger claims originate with a panel of three Court of First Instance judges, with a right of de novo appeal to a three-judge panel of Court of Appeals judges. Appeals from the Court of Appeals are limited to legal issues, and are conducted before the Court of Cassation, which is the highest court of Egypt's common court system." according to EgyptJustice.com.

=== Hisbah ===
Unlike Saudi Arabia and some other Muslim countries, the Egyptian legal system has no office of hisbah (Islamic religious police force), but it does allows for "hisbah" lawsuits. Hisbah is an Islamic doctrine calling for Muslims, including rulers and governments, to enjoin good and forbid bad. At least as of March 2016, hisbah lawsuits in Egypt "are based on Article 3 of the Code of Procedure". The article allows "anyone to file a lawsuit against any creative work by an artist, writer or public figure as long as the plaintiff has an interest in it" and the lawsuit is "aimed at avoiding imminent damage or at documenting evidence". (While under standard legal rules a plaintiff attempting to sue must demonstrate they have standing to sue the defendant because they have not incurred loss or otherwise have any "direct interest", which they would not if they were suing an alleged Muslim deviant for the defendant's beliefs – specifically alleged heresy or blasphemy – under the doctrine of hisbah the plaintiffs have direct interest by virtue of their being "Muslims exercising their duty of commanding right and forbidding wrong". This was made clear by a 1995 ruling by the appeals court against professor Nasr Abu Zayd)

Hisbah lawsuits in Egypt (in which the word "ḥisba" may rarely appear, but in which "the logic of ḥisba can easily be detected"), "are submitted to the public prosecutor, who determines their merit". The law has been criticized by the Institution of Freedom of Thought and Expression and the Supreme Council for the Press for violating provisions of the Egyptian Constitution, which state, "Freedom of thought and opinion is guaranteed. Every person has the right to express his opinion verbally, in writing, through imagery, or by any other means of expression and publication," but has been applied against "writers, activists, artists, and bloggers" for "sexual orientation, religious beliefs, political opinions, or moral standing" since the Egyptian revolution of 2011.

== Arbitration ==
According to Mohamed Samy E. Abdel Wahab, a leading Egyptian and international legal scholar and arbitration expert, "arbitration has established itself as a prominent method for resolving business, commercial, and investment disputes" in Egypt, based on 'Arbitration Law No.27 of the Year 1994'. Egyptian courts are "generally arbitration friendly" with judges "generally" accepting and supporting arbitral proceedings.

== Courts ==
The Judiciary of Egypt consists of administrative and non-administrative courts, a Supreme Constitutional Court, penal courts, civil and commercial courts, personal status and family courts, national security courts, labour courts, military courts, and other specialized courts or circuits.

Amendments to some articles of the 2014 Constitution passed by a public referendum followed on 19–22 April 2019, provide for the president to appoint the heads of the judicial bodies or authorities and to be head of the Supreme Council for the Judicial Authorities. Other members of that council include the head of the Supreme Constitutional Court, the heads of other judicial authorities, the head of the Cairo Court of Appeal and the Attorney-General.

- The Supreme Constitutional Court is the highest judicial power in Egypt. Article 25 of the Supreme Constitutional Court's Law No.48 of the Year 1979 (which was still in effect as of 2019), empowers the court to rule on:
  - the constitutionality of laws and regulations;
  - jurisdiction disputes between judicial bodies or authorities of judicial competence;
  - disputes resulting from enforcement of contradictory rulings issued by two different judicial entities;
  - interpretation of laws issued by the Legislative Authority and the decrees issued by the Head of the State in case of any divergence with respect to their implementation.
- Court of Cassation (Maḥkamet El Naqḍ)

The Court of Cassation, the only one in its category, was established in 1931 and based in Cairo. The Court of Cassation, the exclusive body atop the judicial hierarchy in Egypt, was designated with the purpose of creating a central tool to provide exclusive and uniform interpretation and application of law.

The jurisdiction of Court of Cassation basically includes consideration of challenges brought to it by either adversary or by the public prosecution.

It also includes examining lawsuits related to judges' actions. In such a case, the court undertakes its role as a court of merit, rather than a court of law.

It also has the power to give rulings on requests of reparations for all violated verdicts. The court issues annual collections on approved judicial principles under the title “Rulings and Principles of The Court of Cassation”.

- Court of Appeal

Courts of Appeal, some which are called Higher Courts of Appeal, have the competence to consider rulings by the courts of first instance falling under its jurisdiction should these rulings be liable for appeal.

According to the Egyptian judiciary law, there are seven courts of appeal in Egypt; in Cairo, Alexandria, Tanta, Mansoura, Ismailia, Beni Swaif and Assuit.

- Court of First Instance

These courts of first instance have the competence to consider lawsuits filed before them as may fall under their jurisdictions. Their rulings are liable to appeal.

- Courts of limited jurisdiction

These courts have the competence to issue rulings on lawsuits of limited importance, falling under their geographical and term jurisdictions.

These rulings are liable to appeal.

- Family Court

The Family Court (FC) was established in 2004, motivated by the need to differentiate between family litigations and other disputes. It is intended to provide a specialized judiciary tool that would take cognizance of such cases in an atmosphere totally different from that of other lawsuits.

This aims to secure psychological peace for the children who may be involved, especially in such cases of tutelage, divorce, alimony, custody, etc.

The ultimate objective of this court is to hammer out an amicable settlement for family problems through specialized guidance bureaus.

- Egyptian State Lawsuits Authority
- Public Prosecution

The public prosecution acts as public attorney before criminal courts with the right to file criminal actions. It was given the right by the Egyptian legislation to initiate action even if plaintiff has relinquished his right to do so.

- Administrative judiciary

This judiciary has the jurisdiction to decide on administrative disputes to which any administrative body is involved.

Egypt has adopted a dual system of judiciary, i.e. the ordinary and administrative judiciary.

References : An Approach to Legal English & Terminology – DR.Mostafa El-Morshedy

== See also ==
- Politics of Egypt
- Egyptian Judges' Club
