= Secularism in Egypt =

Egypt's first experience of secularism started with the British Occupation (1882–1922), the atmosphere which allowed the protection of debate. In this environment pro-secularist intellectuals like Yaqub Sarruf, Faris Nimr, Nicola Haddad who sought political asylum from Ottoman Rule were able to publish their work. This debate had then become a burning issue with the work of Egyptian Shaykh Ali Abdel Raziq (1888–1966), “The most momentous document in the crucial intellectual and religious debate of modern Islamic history”.

By 1919 Egypt had its first political secular entity called the Hizb 'Almani (Secular Party) - this name was later changed to the Wafd Party. It combined secular policies with a nationalist agenda and had the majority support in the following years against both the rule of the king and the British influence. The Wafd party supported the allies during World War II and then proceeded to win the 1952 parliamentary elections. Following these elections, the prime minister was overthrown by the King, leading to riots. These riots precipitated a military coup after which all political parties were banned including the Wafd Party and the Muslim Brotherhood. The government of Gamal Abdel Nasser was secularist-nationalist in nature which at the time gathers a great deal of support both in Egypt and other Arab states.

Key elements of Nasserism:

- Secularist/Nationalist dictatorship; No religious or other political movements allowed to impact government
- Modernization
- Industrialization
- Concentration on Arab values rather than Muslim values

Following the death of Nasser, President Anwar Sadat (1970–1981) continued economic liberalization and maintained the government's secularist policy, even going as far as signing peace agreements with Israel which was a first for any Middle Eastern country. However, following further intensive clampdowns on political opposition, Sadat was assassinated and replaced by Hosni Mubarak who again faced the issue of keeping the Islamist support at bay whilst keeping his power base during increased pressure to be democratic. Nowadays, most proponents of secularism emphasize the link between secularism and ‘national unity’ between Coptic Christians and Muslims.

Following the Egyptian revolution of 2011 as part of the regional Arab Spring protests, Mubarak was ousted and the following year Mohamed Morsi who is backed by the Muslim Brotherhood won Egypt's first democratic elections. In 2013 Morsi was removed from power in a coup led by Abdel Fattah el-Sisi. Sisi has called for religious tolerance and has cracked down and banned the Muslim Brotherhood. He has licensed thousands of churches and mosques and made it illegal to ban burkini's in private resorts and beaches. A report by The Economist in 2017 stated that Egyptians were turning more secular again, with supporters of sharia law dropping by more than half since 2011, people praying less than before, and gender equality now being widely accepted. The government has also acted to preserve its Jewish heritage through the restoration of the abandoned Eliyahu Hanavi Synagogue in Alexandria in 2017.

== See also ==
- Religion in Egypt
- Constitution of Egypt
- Islam in Egypt
- Christianity in Egypt
- Politics of Egypt
- Culture of Egypt
