= Sherine Tadros =

British broadcaster

Sherine Tadros (Arabic: شيرين تادرس; born 1980) is a British broadcaster who is the Head of New York (UN) Office at Amnesty International. She was previously a broadcast journalist, working for Sky News and for Al Jazeera English as the channel's correspondent in Gaza, Palestine, and an anchor based in Doha, Qatar.

== Early life ==
Born in central London, Tadros is of Egyptian descent. She graduated with a degree in Middle East politics from the SOAS University of London, and then took a master's degree in the same field.

== Journalism career ==
=== Early career ===
Tadros began her career with the Al-Arabiya network, working as a producer, before joining Al Jazeera in 2005.

=== Gaza conflict ===
During the 2008–2009 Israel–Gaza conflict, Tadros and her Al Jazeera colleague Ayman Mohyeldin were the only journalists for the English-language news media reporting from inside Gaza. Foreign press access to Gaza was barred, both by Israel and by Egypt. However, as Al Jazeera English was unique, among English-language broadcasters, in maintaining a bureau in Gaza, Tadros and Mohyeldin were already inside the territory, and familiar with their turf, when the conflict began. They were therefore able to provide an original and important record of the conflict, unmatched by the rest of the global media.

=== Arab Spring ===
Tadros also covered the 2011 Egyptian revolution, as well as the uprisings in Libya and Yemen.

== Later career ==
=== Amnesty International ===
Tadros began work for Amnesty as head of its United Nations Office in 2016

== Awards ==
In 2012, Tadros was awarded the Breakaway Award, which spotlights promising younger journalists, at the 8th annual International Media Awards in London.

In 2011, she also accepted, on behalf of Al Jazeera English, a Peabody Award presented for the coverage of the "Arab awakening".
