= List of ministers of finance of Egypt =

This is an incomplete list of finance ministers of Egypt. Each minister's name is followed by the date when he took office.

== List of ministers of finance ==
=== Kingdom of Egypt ===
Name	Term	Notes
Muhammad Sharif Pasha al-Kabir	c. 1844 - ?	
Prince Mustafa Beik Fadhil	26 February 1856 - ?	
Raghib Pasha	1858–1860	
Ismail Siddiq	1868–1876	
Raghib Pasha	April 1879 – August 1879	
Riyad Pasha	1879-1881	
Mustafa Fahmi	1884-1887	
Riad El Sarraff	15 April 1914 – 21 May 1920	
Mahmoud Fakhry Pasha	1920-1921	
Ismail Sidky	1921 - ?	
Ismail Sidky	1922 - ?	
Mohammed Moheb Basha	15 March 1923 – 6 August 1923	
Mohamed Tawfik Naseem Pasha	1924	
Yahya Ibrahim Pasha	1925 – 1926	
Muhammad Mahmud	1927-1928	
Ali Mahir	1928-1929	
Makram Ebeid	1930	
Hassan Sabry Pasha	1933-1934	
Ahmed Abdel Wahab Pasha	1934-1936	
Makram Ebeid	1936-1937	
Ahmad Mahir	1938-?	
Husayn Sirri	1939-1940	
Abdel Hamid Badawi Pasha	1940–1941	
Makram Ebeid	1942	
Kamel Sidky	1942-1943	
Amin Osman	1943-1944	
Makram Ebeid	1944-1945	
Ibrahim Abdel Hady Pasha	1946-1947	
Ibrahim Abdel Hady Pasha	1948-1949	
Abd Al-Mutaal Bey	Jan 1950 - Nov 1950	
Fouad Serageddin	Nov 1950 - Jan 1952	
Abd Al-Mutaal Bey	Jan 1952 - July 1952	
Abd Al-Jalil Al-Imari	24 July 1952 – 25 February 1954	

=== Arab Republic of Egypt ===
Name	Term	Notes
Ali Al-Garaitli	Feb 1954 - March 1954	
Abd Al-Jalil Al-Imari	March 1954 – April 1954	
Abd Al-Hamid Al-Sharif	April 1954 – Sept 1954	
Abdul Munim Qaysuni	Sept 1954 - 1961	
Abdul Latif Mahmoud El-Boughdadi	1961-1962	
Abdul Munim Qaysuni	1962-1964	
Nazih Deif	1964-1968	
Abdul Munim Qaysuni	1968	
Abdul Aziz Hegazi	20 March 1968 - 1974	
Mohammed Abdul Fatah Ibrahim	25 April 1974 - 1974	
Mohammed Hamdi El-Nashar	25 November 1974 - 1975	
Ahmed Abu Ismail	16 April 1975 - 1976	
Mahmoud Salah Eldin Hamed	19 November 1976 - 1978	
Ali Lutfi	5 October 1978 - 1980	
Abdul Razaq Abdul Mageed	14 May 1980 - 1982	
Mahmoud Salah Eldin Hamed	3 January 1982 - 1986	
Mohammed Ahmed El Razaz	11 November 1986 – 1996	
Mohei El-Deen Abu Bakr El Ghareeb	11 January 1996 - 1999	
Mohamed Medhat Hassanein	10 October 1999 – 2004	
Youssef Boutros-Ghali	1 June 2004 – 31 January 2011	
Samir Radwan	31 January/6 February 2011 – 17 July 2011	
Hazem Al Beblawi	17 July 2011 – December 2011	
Momtaz El-Saeed	December 2011 – 5 January 2013	
Morsi Hegazy	5 January – 7 May 2013	
Fayyad Abdel Moneim	7 May – 16 July 2013	
Ahmed Galal	16 July 2013 – February 2014	
Hani Qadri Demian	February 2014 – March 2016	
Amr El-Garhy	23 March 2016 – June 2018	
Mohamed Maait	June 2018 - July 2024	
Ahmed Kouchouk	Since July 2024 -	

== See also ==
- Ministry of Finance
- Economy of Egypt
- Cabinet of Egypt
