= Abdel Aziz Mohamed Hegazy =

Egyptian politician (1923-2014)

- عبد العزيز محمد حجازي
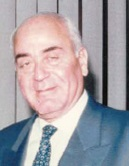
- Hegazy in 1981

38th Prime Minister of Egypt
- In office 25 September 1974 – 16 April 1975
- President: Anwar Sadat
- Preceded by: Anwar Sadat
- Succeeded by: Mamdouh Salem

Minister of Finance
- In office 20 March 1968 – 25 April 1974
- President: Gamal Abdel Nasser; Anwar Sadat
- Prime Minister: Gamal Abdel Nasser; Mahmoud Fawzi; Aziz Sedky; Anwar Sadat
- Preceded by: Nazih Deif
- Succeeded by: Mohamed Abdel Fattah Ibrahim

Minister of Economy and Foreign Trade
- In office 27 March 1973 – 25 April 1974
- President: Anwar Sadat
- Prime Minister: Anwar Sadat
- Preceded by: Mohamed Marzaban
- Succeeded by: Fathi Ahmed El-Matboly

Personal details
- Born: 3 January 1923
- Died: 22 December 2014 (aged 91)
- Party: Arab Socialist Union

Abd El Aziz Mohamed Hegazy (also known as Abdulaziz Hijazi) (Arabic: عبد العزيز محمد حجازي, IPA: [ʕæbdelˈʕæziːz mæˈħæmmæd ħeˈɡæːzi]; 3 January 1923 – 22 December 2014) was the 38th Prime Minister of Egypt during the presidency of Anwar Sadat.

== Career ==
Hegazy received his PhD in commerce from the University of Birmingham in 1951. He was lecturer and later professor at the Cairo University and became Dean of the Faculty of Commerce at the Ain Shams University in 1966.

Hegazy served as Minister of the Treasury 1968 to 1972, and Minister of Finance and Foreign Trade 1973 to 1974. He was prime minister from 25 September 1974 to 16 April 1975. He was the head of the General Federation of Civil Society Groups.

Political offices
| Preceded by Anwar Sadat | Prime Minister of Egypt; 1974–1975 | Succeeded by Mamdouh Mohamed Salem |
