= First cabinet of Maher Pasha =

Egyptian government between January and May 1936

First Cabinet of Maher Pasha
- Cabinet of Kingdom of Egypt
- Date formed: 31 January 1936
- Date dissolved: 9 May 1936

People and organisations
- Head of state: King Fuad; King Farouk
- Head of government: Aly Maher Pasha
- No. of ministers: 8

History
- Predecessor: Cabinet of Mohamed Tawfik Naseem Pasha
- Successor: Cabinet of Mostafa Nahhas Pasha

First cabinet of Maher Pasha was one of the governments of the Kingdom of Egypt. It was the last cabinet in the reign of King Fuad and the first one in the reign of King Farouk. It was headed by Aly Maher Pasha and existed between 31 January and May 1936. It replaced the government headed by Mohamed Tawfik Naseem Pasha who resigned on 22 January 1936. The cabinet was formed following the agreement of the political parties and was a caretaker government.

On 9 May 1936 Prime Minister Aly Maher Pasha submitted his resignation to Mohamed Aly who was the senior regent following the death of King Fuad in April. Mustafa Nahhas Pasha was assigned to form the next cabinet.

== Cabinet members ==
The cabinet was composed of the following eight politicians. Only one of them, Ahmed Abdel Wahab Pasha, was a member of the previous cabinet and also, held the same post. Some of them held more than one ministerial post.

Portfolio	Minister	Took office	Left office	Party
Prime Minister	Aly Maher Pasha	31 January 1936	May 1936	
Minister of Foreign Affairs	Aly Maher Pasha	31 January 1936	May 1936	
Minister of Finance	Ahmed Abdel Wahab Pasha	31 January 1936	May 1936	
Minister of Interior	Aly Maher Pasha	31 January 1936	May 1936	
Minister of Defense	Lewa Aly Sidki	31 January 1936	May 1936	
Minister of Education	Mohammad Ali Allouba Pasha	31 January 1936	May 1936	
Minister of Commerce	Hassan Sabry Pasha	31 January 1936	May 1936	
Minister of Waqfs	Ahmad Ali Pasha	31 January 1936	May 1936	
Minister of Justice	Ahmad Ali Pasha	31 January 1936	May 1936	
Minister of Public Works	Hafez Hassan Pasha	31 January 1936	May 1936	
Minister of Agriculture	Sadek Wahba Pasha	31 January 1936	May 1936	
Minister of Communication	Hassan Sabry Pasha	31 January 1936	May 1936	
