= Ahmed Abdel Wahab Pasha =

Egyptian economist and politician (1889–1938)

Minister of Finance
- In office 15 November 1934 – May 1936
- Monarchs: King Fouad; King Farouk
- Prime Minister: Mohamed Tawfik Naseem Pasha; Aly Maher Pasha
- Preceded by: Hassan Sabry Pasha
- Succeeded by: Makram Ebeid

Personal details
- Born: 1889 Bani Muhammad Al Shihabiyya, Asyut Governorate, Khedivate of Egypt
- Died: 16 April 1938 (aged 48–49) Cairo, Kingdom of Egypt

Ahmed Abdel Wahab Pasha (1889–1938) was an Egyptian statesman who served as the minister of finance between 1934 and 1936.

== Biography ==
Abdel Wahab was born in Bani Muhammad Al Shihabiyya, Asyut Governorate, in 1889. He was educated in Cairo and London.

Following his graduation Abdel Wahab worked as a lecturer at the Higher School of Commerce in Cairo. He was given the title Bey and headed a group of the Egyptian young technocrats called Thirty Club. In 1929 he was appointed undersecretary of state at the ministry of finance. In 1930 he was made a Pasha. He was a member of the Egyptian delegation to the World Economic Conference held in London between 12 June to 27 July 1933. On 15 November 1934 he was appointed minister of finance to the cabinet led by Prime Minister Mohamed Tawfik Naseem Pasha, replacing Hassan Sabry Pasha in the post. His term ended on 22 January 1936 when the cabinet resigned. In mid-January 1936 he was made the vice chairman of the newly founded Anglo-Egyptian Union of which Edward Cook, governor of the National Bank, was chairman.

Abdel Wahap was appointed the minister of finance for a second time to the cabinet of Prime Minister Aly Maher Pasha which was formed on 31 January 1936. He remained in office until the resignation of the cabinet in May 1936. His successor as finance minister was Makram Ebeid. In March 1937 he was named as the board member of the National Bank of Egypt. Abdel Wahab died of pneumonitis on 16 April 1938 in Cairo at age 49.
