= Ottoman Egypt =

Administrative division of the Ottoman Empire from (1517–1867)

Coordinates: 30°03′N 31°13′E

Eyalet of Egypt إيالة مصر (Arabic) Iyalat Misr ایالت مصر (Ottoman Turkish) Eyālet-i Mıṣr
- Ottoman province (1517–1805); Autonomous province (1805–1914)
- 1517–1914
- Flag Coat of arms (1854–67)

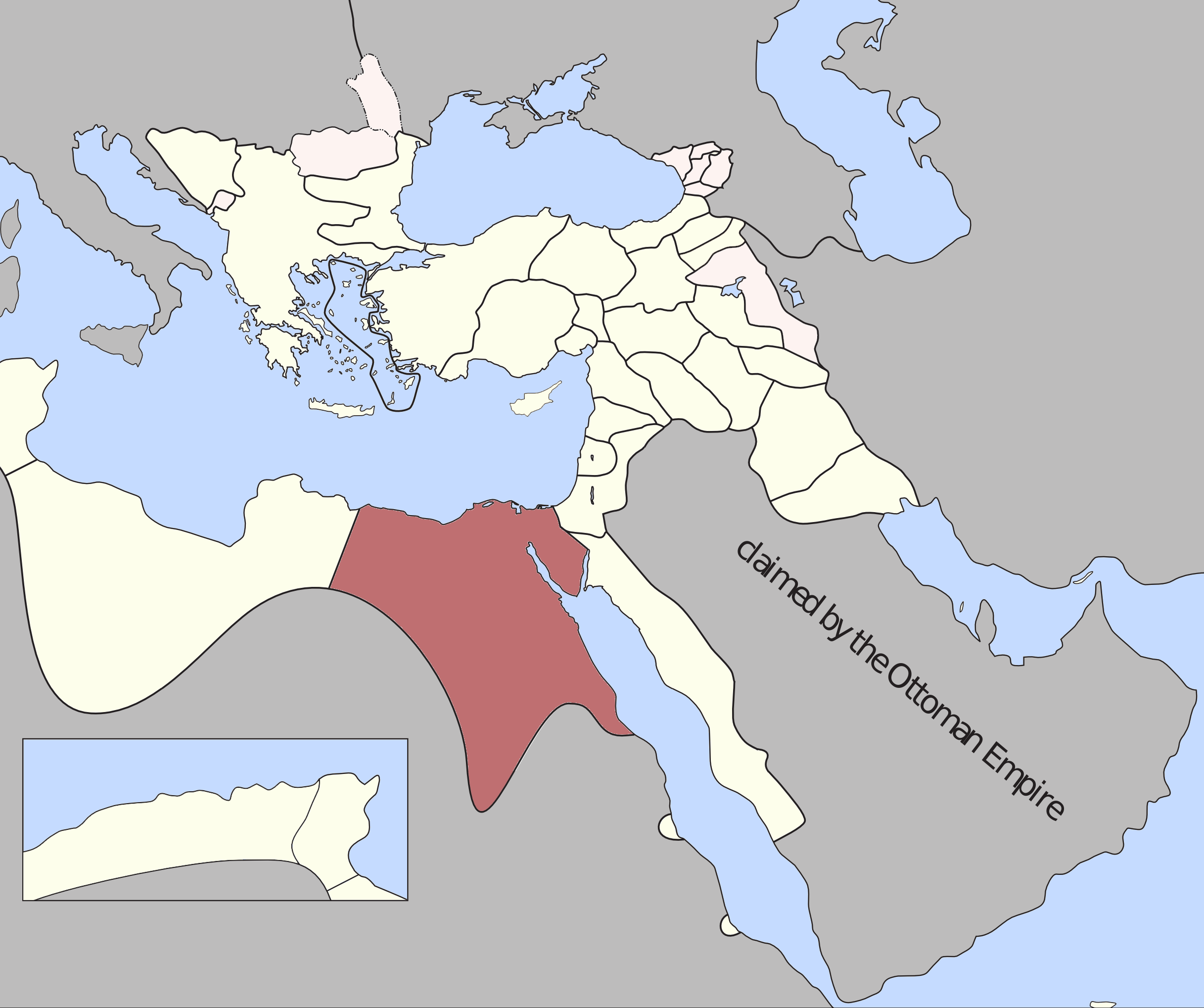
- Map of the Eyalet of Egypt in 1795
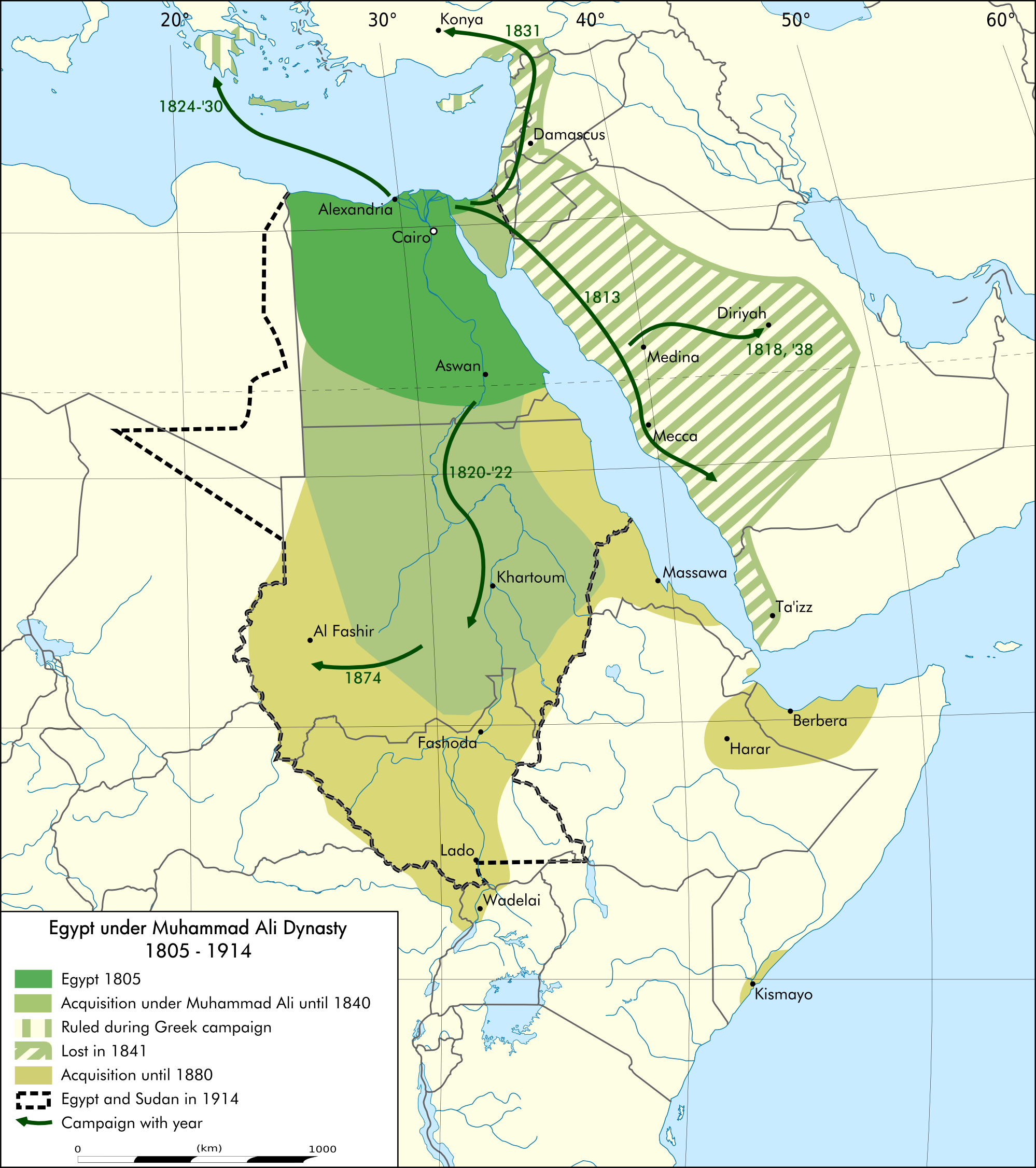
- Expansion of the Eyalet under Muhammad Ali and his sons
- Capital: Cairo
- Demonym: Egyptians
- Population
  - 1700: 2,335,000
  - 1867: 6,076,000
- Government
- Governor
  - 1517: Yunus Pasha
  - 1805–1848 (Note: as unrecognized Wāli and Khedive): Muhammad Ali Pasha
  - 1863–1867: Isma'il Pasha
- Grand Vizier
  - 1857–1858: Said Pasha Zulfikar (first)
  - 1866–1867: Sherif Pasha (last)
- Historical era: Early modern period
  - Ottoman conquest: 1517
  - French Campaign: 1798–1801
  - Rise of Muhammad Ali: 1801–1805
  - Conquest of Sudan: 1820–1822
  - Egyptian–Ottoman War: 1831–1833
  - Khedivate recognized: 1867
  - British invasion: 1882
  - British protectorate: 1914
Preceded by
Mamluk Sultanate
Funj Sultanate
First Saudi state
Shilluk Kingdom
Succeeded by
Sultanate of Egypt
Second Saudi state
Hejaz Vilayet

Ottoman Egypt was an administrative division of the Ottoman Empire after the conquest of Mamluk Egypt by the Ottomans in 1517. The Ottomans administered Egypt as a province (eyalet) of their empire (Ottoman Turkish: ایالت مصر, romanized: Eyālet-i Mıṣr). It remained formally an Ottoman province until 1914, though in practice it became increasingly autonomous during the 19th century and was under de facto British control from 1882.

Egypt always proved a difficult province for the Ottoman Sultans to control, due in part to the continuing power and influence of the Mamluks, the Egyptian military caste who had ruled the country for centuries. As such, Egypt remained semi-autonomous under the Mamluks until Napoleon Bonaparte's French forces invaded in 1798. After Anglo-Turkish forces expelled the French in 1801, Muhammad Ali Pasha, an Albanian military commander of the Ottoman army in Egypt, seized power in 1805, and established a quasi-independent state.

Egypt under the Muhammad Ali dynasty remained nominally an Ottoman province. In reality, it was practically independent and went to war twice with the empire, from 1831 to 1833 and again from 1839 to 1841. The Ottoman sultan granted Egypt the status of an autonomous vassal state or Khedivate in 1867. Isma'il Pasha (Khedive from 1867 to 1879) and Tewfik Pasha (Khedive from 1879 to 1892) governed Egypt as a quasi-independent state under Ottoman suzerainty until the British occupation of 1882. Nevertheless, the Khedivate of Egypt (1867–1914) remained a de jure Ottoman province until 5 November 1914, when the Sultanate of Egypt was declared a British protectorate in reaction to the Young Turks of the Ottoman Empire joining the First World War on the side of the Central Powers (October–November 1914).

== History ==
=== Early Ottoman period ===
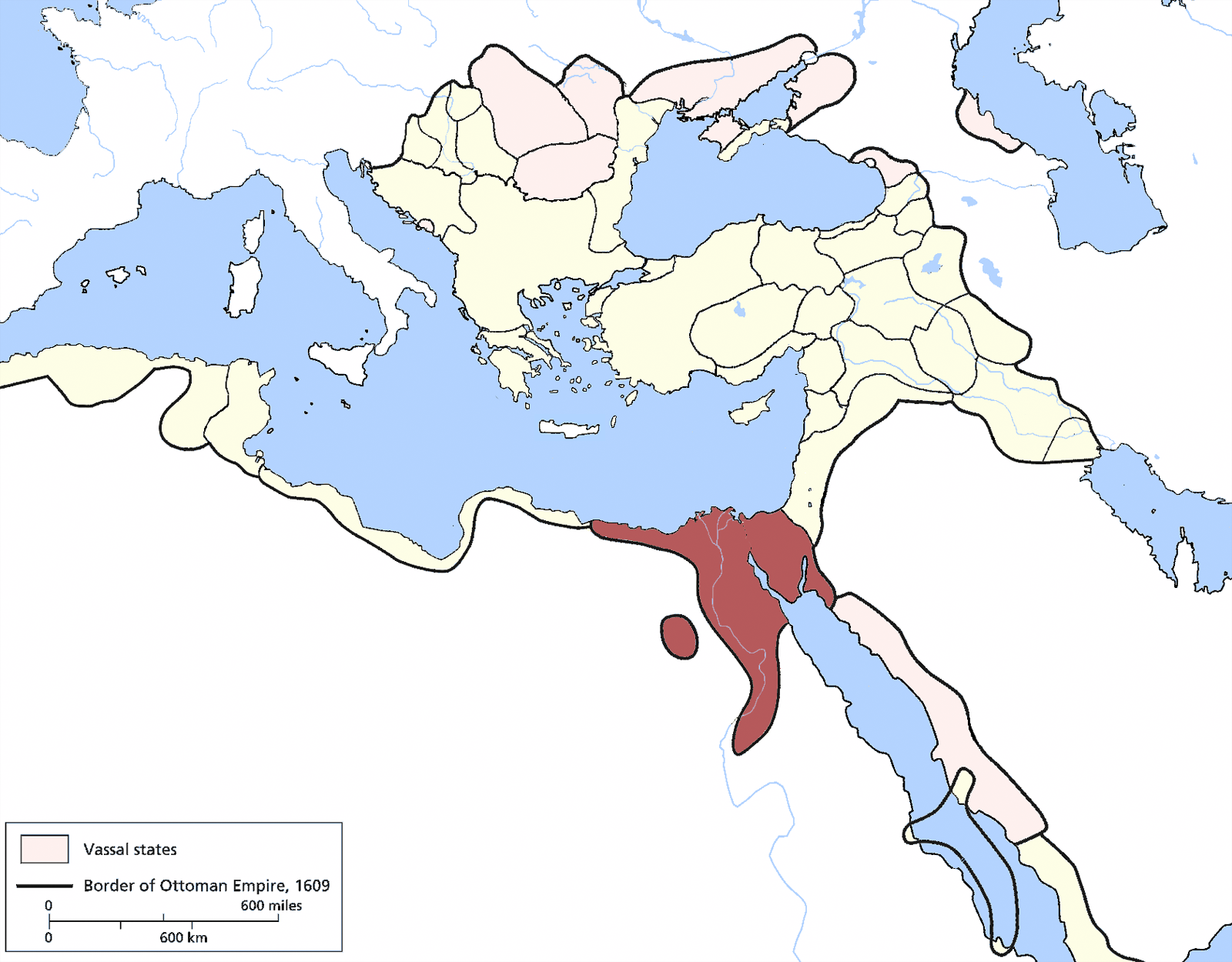
The Eyalet in 1609

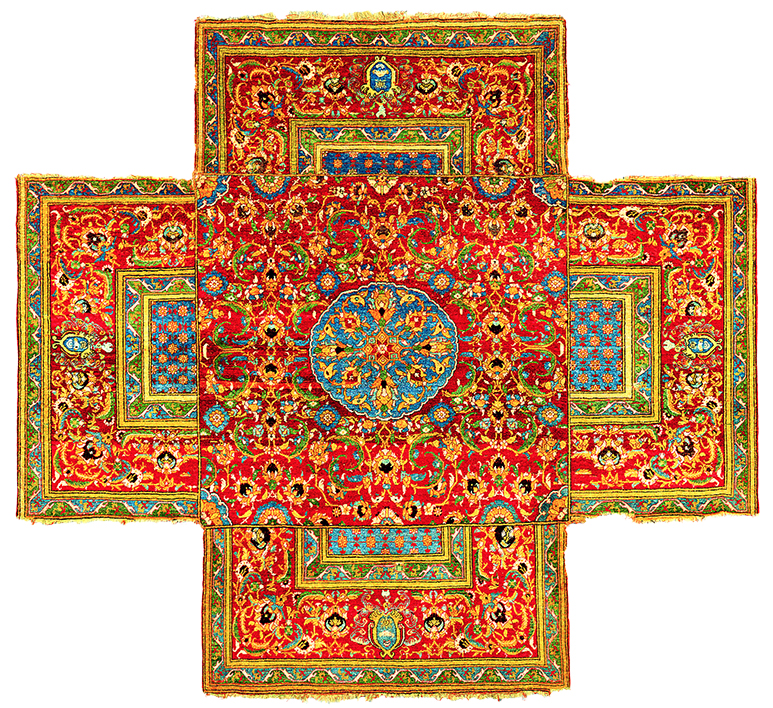
Ottoman Cairene cruciform table carpet, mid 16th century

After the conquest of Egypt in 1517, the Ottoman Sultan Selim I left the country. Grand Vizier Yunus Pasha was awarded the governorship of Egypt. However, the sultan soon discovered that Yunus Pasha had created an extortion and bribery syndicate, and gave the office to Hayır Bey, the former Mamluk governor of Aleppo, who had contributed to the Ottoman victory at the Battle of Marj Dabiq.

The history of early Ottoman Egypt is a competition for power between the Mamluks and the representatives of the Ottoman Sultan.

The register by which a great portion of the land was a fief of the Mamluks was left unchanged, allowing the Mamluks to quickly return to positions of great influence. The Mamluk emirs were to be retained in office as heads of 12 sanjaks, into which Egypt was divided; and under the next sultan, Suleiman the Magnificent, two chambers were created, called the Greater Divan and Lesser Divan, in which both the army and the ecclesiastical authorities were represented, to aid the pasha by their deliberations. Six regiments were constituted by the conqueror Selim for the protection of Egypt; to those Suleiman added a seventh, of Circassians.

It was the practice of the Sublime Porte to change the governor of Egypt at short intervals, after a year or less. The fourth governor, Hain Ahmed Pasha, hearing that orders for his execution had come from Constantinople, endeavoured to make himself an independent ruler and had coins struck in his own name. His schemes were frustrated by two of the emirs whom he had imprisoned and who, escaping from their confinement, attacked him in his bath and attempted to kill him; although Ahmed Pasha escaped wounded, he was soon captured and executed by the Ottoman sultan's forces.

In 1519, Mamluks like the kashif (provincial governor) of Gharbiyya, Inal al-Sayfi Tarabay, started slaughtering Arab Bedouin shaykhs like Shukr and his brother Hasan ibn Mar'i in revenge for the Bedouin betraying the Mamluks to the Ottomans. They executed another brother of the two in Cairo and at Bab al-Nasr they hoisted the heads of the two brothers. The kashif of Qalyub killed another Arab Bedouin shaykh, 'Ali al-Asmar ibn Abi'l-Shawarib. At a council of Arab shaykhs, one of the shaykhs, Husam al-Din ibn Baghdad, accused the Mamluks of murdering the Bedouin for their Ottoman sympathies.

==== 1527 to 1610 ====
In 1527, the first survey of Egypt under the Ottomans was made, after the official copy of the former registers had perished by fire; this new survey did not come into use until 1605. Egyptian lands were divided into four classes: the sultan's domain, fiefs, land for the maintenance of the army, and lands settled on religious foundations.

The constant changes in the government seem to have caused the army to get out of control at an early period of the Ottoman occupation, and at the beginning of the 17th-century mutinies became common; in 1604, governor Maktul Hacı Ibrahim Pasha (then known just as Ibrahim Pasha) was murdered by the soldiers, and his head set on the Bab Zuweila, earning him the epithet Maktul, "the Slain". The reason for these mutinies was the attempt made by successive pashas to put a stop to the extortion called the tulbah, a forced payment exacted by the troops from the inhabitants of the country by the fiction of debts requiring to be discharged, which led to grievous ill-usage.

In 1609, a conflict broke out between the army and the pasha, who had loyal regiments on his side and the Bedouins. The soldiers went so far as to choose a sultan, and to provisionally divide the regions of Cairo between them. They were defeated by the governor Kara Mehmed Pasha, who, on 5 February 1610, entered Cairo in triumph, executed the ringleaders, and banished others to Yemen, earning him the nickname Kul Kıran (lit. 'Slavebreaker'). Historians such as Ibn Abi al-Surur speak of this event as a second conquest of Egypt for the Ottomans. A great financial reform was then effected by Kara Mehmed Pasha, who readjusted the burdens imposed on the different communities of Egypt in accordance with their means.

==== 17th century ====
With the troubles that beset the metropolis of the Ottoman Empire, the local Mamluk beys began to dominate the Egyptian administration, being placed in charge of the treasury and given a virtual monopoly over the various provincial administrations. In addition, Mamluk beys came to hold important military positions within Egypt, giving them a power source with which to challenge Ottoman-appointed governors. The governors appointed thence came to be treated by the Egyptians with continually decreasing respect. In July 1623, an order came from the Porte dismissing Kara Mustafa Pasha, and appointing Çeşteci Ali Pasha governor in his place. The officers met the deputy of the newly appointed governor and demanded from him the customary gratuity; when the deputy refused, they sent letters to the Porte declaring that they wished to have Kara Mustafa Pasha, and not Çeşteci Ali Pasha, as governor. Meanwhile, Çeşteci Ali Pasha had arrived at Alexandria and was met by a deputation from Cairo telling him that he was not wanted. He returned a mild answer; when a rejoinder came in the same style as the first message, he had the leader of the deputation arrested and imprisoned. The garrison of Alexandria then attacked the castle and rescued the prisoner, whereupon Çeşteci Ali Pasha was compelled to reembark on his ship and escape. Shortly thereafter, a rescript arrived from Constantinople confirming Kara Mustafa Pasha in the governorship. Mustafa was succeeded by Bayram Pasha in 1626.

Officers in the Ottoman Egyptian army were appointed locally from the various militias, and had strong ties to the Egyptian aristocracy. Thus Ridwan Bey, a Mamluk emir, was able to exercise de facto authority over Egypt from 1631 to 1656. In 1630, Koca Musa Pasha was the newly appointed governor, when the army took it upon themselves to depose him, in indignation at his execution of Kits Bey, an officer who was to have commanded an Egyptian force required for service in Persia. Koca Musa Pasha was given the choice of handing over the executioners to vengeance, or to resigning his place; as he refused to do the former, he was compelled to do the latter. In 1631, a rescript came from Constantinople, approving the conduct of the army and appointing Halil Pasha as Koca Musa Pasha's successor. Not only was the governor unsupported by the sultan against the troops, but each new governor regularly inflicted a fine upon his outgoing predecessor, under the name of money due to the treasury; the outgoing governor would not be allowed to leave Egypt until he had paid it. Besides the extortions to which this practice gave occasion, the country suffered greatly in these centuries from famine and pestilence. In the spring of 1619, pestilence is said to have killed 635,000 persons and, in 1643, completely desolated 230 villages.

The 17th century saw the development of two distinct factions within Egypt who continually vied for power, the Faqari and the Qasimi. The Faqari had strong links to the Ottoman cavalry and donned white colours and used the Pomegranate as their symbol. Conversely, the Qasimi were aligned with native Egyptian troops and donned red as their colour and adopted a disc shaped symbol as their banner. By the end of the Century these factions were well established and wielded a significant amount of influence over Ottoman governors. Between 1688 and 1755, Mamluk beys, allied with Bedouin and factions within the Ottoman garrison, deposed at least thirty-four governors.

=== Later Ottoman period ===
==== 1707 to 1755 ====
By the 18th century, the importance of the pasha was superseded by that of the Mameluk beys; two offices, those of Shaykh al-Balad and Amir al-hajj—which were held by Mamluks—represented the real headship of the community. The process by which this came about is obscure, owing to the want of good chronicles for the Turkish period of Egyptian history. In 1707, the shaykh al-balad, Qasim Iywaz, was the head of one of two Mameluke factions, the Qasimites and the Fiqarites, between whom the seeds of enmity were sown by the pasha of the time, with the result that a fight took place between the factions outside Cairo, lasting eighty days. At the end of that time, Qasim Iywaz was killed and the office which he had held was given to his son Ismail. Ismail held this office for 16 years, while the pashas were constantly being changed, and succeeded in reconciling the two factions of Mamelukes. In 1711, an event known to chroniclers as the "Great Sedition" and the "revolution" occurred, when a religious fanatic preacher began to publicly denounce the practice of praying at the graves of Sufi saints, sparking a religious movement that was not crushed for three years until 1714. In 1724, Ismail was assassinated through the machinations of the pasha, and Shirkas Bey—of the opposing faction—was elevated to the office of Sheikh al-Balad in his place. He was soon driven from his post by one of his own faction called Dhu-'l-Fiqar, and fled to Upper Egypt. After a short time, he returned at the head of an army, and in the last of the ensuing battles Shirkas Bey met his end by drowning. Dhu-'l-Fiqar was himself assassinated in 1730. His place was filled by Othman Bey, who had served as his general in this war.

In 1743, Othman Bey was forced to flee from Egypt by the intrigues of two adventurers, Ibrahim and Ridwan Bey, who—when their scheme had succeeded—began a massacre of beys and others thought to be opposed to them. They proceeded to govern Egypt jointly, holding the offices of Sheikh al-Balad and Amir al-Hajj in alternate years. An attempt by one of the pashas to remove these two by a coup d'état failed, owing to the loyalty of the beys' armed supporters, who released Ibrahim and Ridwan from prison and compelled the pasha to flee to Constantinople. An attempt by a subsequent pasha, in accordance with secret orders from Constantinople, was so successful that some of the beys were killed. Ibrahim and Rilwan escaped and compelled the pasha to resign his governorship and return to Constantinople. Ibrahim was assassinated shortly afterwards by someone who had aspired to occupy one of the vacant beyships, which had instead been conferred upon Ali—who, as Ali Bey al-Kabir, was destined to play an important part in the history of Egypt. The murder of Ibrahim Bey took place in 1755, and his colleague Ridwan perished in the subsequent disputes.

Ali Bey, who had first distinguished himself by defending a caravan in Arabia against bandits, set himself the task of avenging the death of his former master Ibrahim. He spent eight years in purchasing Mamelukes and winning other adherents, exciting the suspicions of the Sheikh al-Balad Khalil Bey, who organised an attack upon him in the streets of Cairo—in consequence of which he fled to Upper Egypt. Here he met one Salib Bey, who had injuries to avenge upon Khalil Bey, and the two organised a force with which they returned to Cairo and defeated Khalil. Khalil was forced to flee to Iaifla, where for a time he concealed himself; eventually he was discovered, sent to Alexandria, and finally strangled. After Ali Bey's victory in 1760, he was made Sheikh al-Balad. He executed the murderer of his former master Ibrahim; but the resentment which this act aroused among the beys caused him to leave his post and flee to Syria, where he won the friendship of the governor of Acre, Daher al-Umar, who obtained for him the goodwill of the Porte and reinstatement in his post as Sheikh al-Balad.

==== 1766 to 1798 ====
In 1766, after the death of his supporter, the grand vizier Raghib Pasha, he was again compelled to flee from Egypt to Yemen, but in the following year he was told that his party at Cairo was strong enough to permit his return. Resuming his office, he raised 18 of his friends to the rank of bey—among them Ibrahim and Murad, who were afterwards at the head of affairs—as well as Muhammad Abu-'l-Dhahab, who was closely connected with the rest of Ali Bey's career. Ali Bey used severe measures to repress the brigandage of the Bedouins of Lower Egypt. He endeavoured to disband all forces except those which were exclusively under his own control.

In 1769, a demand came to Ali Bey for a force of 12,000 men, to be employed by the Porte in the Russo-Turkish War of 1768–1774. It was suggested at Constantinople, however, that Ali would employ securing his own independence, and a messenger was sent by the Porte to the pasha with orders for Ali's execution. Ali, being apprised of the despatch of this messenger by his agents in Constantinople, ordered that the messenger be waylaid and killed. The despatches were seized and read by Ali before an assembly of the beys, who were assured that the order for execution applied to all alike, and he urged them to fight for their lives. His proposals were received with enthusiasm by the beys whom he had created. Egypt was declared independent, and the pasha given 48 hours to quit the country. Daher al-Umar, sheikh of Acre, to whom official information of the step taken by Ali Bey was sent, promised his aid and kept his word by compelling an army sent by the pasha of Damascus against Egypt to retreat.

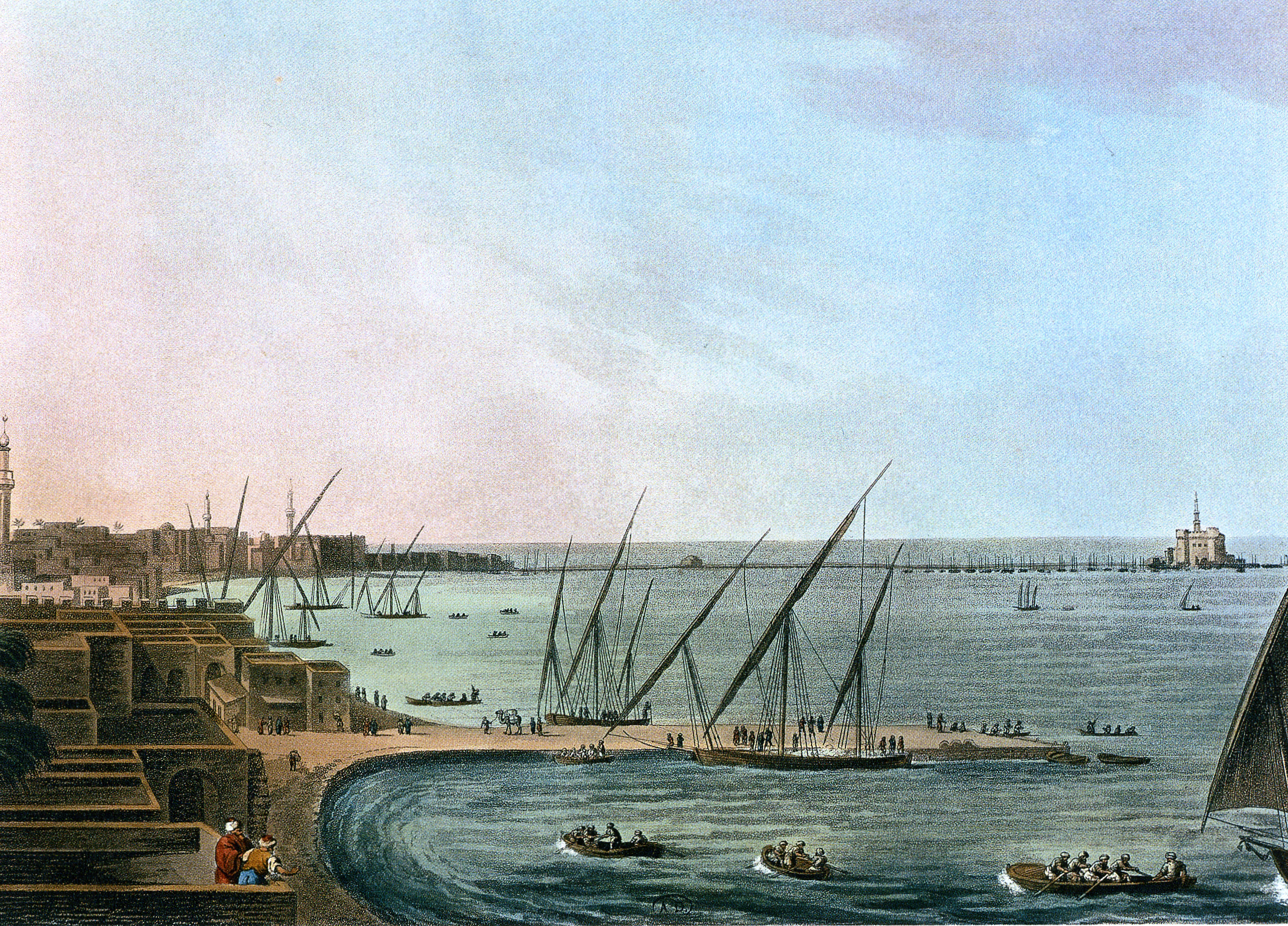
Alexandria in the late 18th century, by Luigi Mayer

The Porte was not able to take active measures at the time for the suppression of Ali Bey, who endeavoured to consolidate his dominions by sending expeditions against marauding tribes in both north and south Egypt, reforming the finance, and improving the administration of justice. His son-in-law, Abu-'l-Dhahab, was sent to subject the Hawwara, who had occupied the land between Aswan and Asyut, and a force of 20,000 men was sent to conquer Yemen. An officer named Ismail Bey was sent with 8,000 men to acquire the eastern shore of the Red Sea, and Hasan Bey was sent to occupy Jedda. In six months, the greater part of the Arabian peninsula was subject to Ali Bey, and he appointed a cousin of his own as Sharif of Mecca—who bestowed on Ali by an official proclamation the titles Sultan of Egypt and Khan of the Two Seas. In 1771, in virtue of this authorisation, he then struck coins in his own name and ordered his name to be mentioned in public worship.

Abu-'l-Dhahab was sent with a force of 30,000 men in the same year to conquer Syria, and agents were sent to negotiate alliances with Venice and Russia. Reinforced by Ali Bey's ally Daher al-Umar, Abu-'l-Dahab easily took the chief cities of Palestine and Syria, ending with Damascus, but at this point he appears to have entered into secret negotiations with the Porte, by which he undertook to restore Egypt to Ottoman suzerainty. He proceeded to evacuate Syria, and marched with all the forces he could collect to Upper Egypt, occupying Assiut in April 1772. Having collected additional troops from the Bedouins, he marched on Cairo. Ismail Bey was sent by Ali Bey with a force of 3,000 to check his advance, but Bastin Ismil and his troops joined Abu-'l-Dhahab. Ali Bey intended at first to defend himself as long as possible in the Cairo Citadel, but receiving information that his friend Daher al-Umar was still willing to give him refuge, he left Cairo for Syria on 8 April 1772, one day before the entrance of Abu-'l-Dhahab.

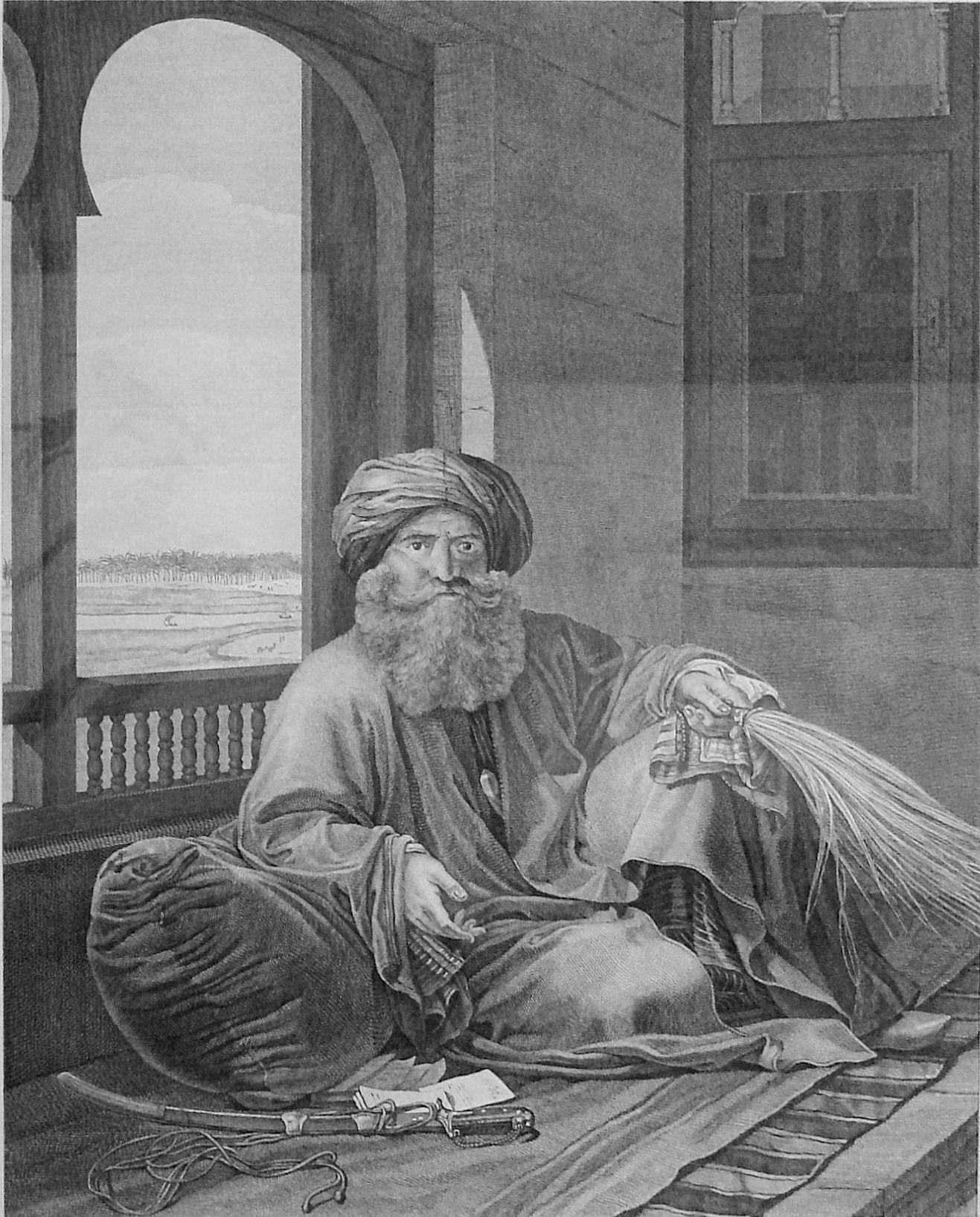
Murad Bey by Dutertre in Description de l'Egypte, 1809

At Acre, Ali's fortune seemed to be restored. A Russian vessel anchored outside the port and, in accordance with the agreement which he had made with the Russian Empire, he was supplied with stores, ammunition, and a force of 3,000 Albanians. He sent one of his officers, Ali Bey al-Tantawi, to recover the Syrian towns evacuated by Abu-'l-Dhahab now in the possession of the Porte. He himself took Jaffa and Gaza, the former of which he gave to his friend Daher al-Umar. On 1 February 1773, he received information from Cairo that Abu-'l-Dhahab had made himself Sheikh al-Balad, and in that capacity was practising unheard-of extortions, which were making Egyptians call for the return of Ali Bey. He accordingly started for Egypt at the head of an army of 8,000 men, and on 19 April met the army of Abu-'l-Dhahab at Salihiyya Madrasa. Ali's forces were successful at the first engagement, but when the battle was renewed two days later, he was deserted by some of his officers and prevented by illness and wounds from himself taking the conduct of affairs. The result was a complete defeat for his army, after which he declined to leave his tent; he was captured after a brave resistance and taken to Cairo, where he died seven days later.

After Ali Bey's death, Egypt became once more a dependency of the Porte, governed by Abu-'l-Dhahab as Sheikh al-Balad with the title pasha. He shortly afterwards received permission from the Porte to invade Syria, with the view of punishing Ali Bey's supporter Daher al-Umar, and left Ismail Bey and Ibrahim Bey as his deputies in Cairo—who, by deserting Ali at the Battle of Salihiyya, had brought about his downfall. After taking multiple cities in Palestine, Abu-'l-Dhahab died, the cause being unknown; Murad Bey, another of the deserters at Salihiyya, brought his forces back to Egypt on 26 May 1775.

Flag of Egypt (1793–1844)

Ismail Bey now became Sheikh al-Balad, but was soon involved in a dispute with Ibrahim and Murad—who, after a time, succeeded in driving Ismail out of Egypt and establishing a joint rule similar to that which had been tried previously (as Sheikh al-Balad and Amir al-Hajj, respectively). The two were soon involved in quarrels, which at one time threatened to break out into open war, but this catastrophe was averted and the joint rule was maintained until 1786, when an expedition was sent by the Porte to restore Ottoman supremacy in Egypt. Murad Bey attempted to resist, but was easily defeated. He, with Ibrahim, decided to flee to Upper Egypt and await the trend of events. On 1 August, the Turkish commander Cezayirli Gazi Hasan Pasha entered Cairo, and after violent measures, had been taken for the restoration of order; Ismail Bey was again made Sheikh al-Balad and a new pasha installed as governor. In January 1791, a terrible plague raged in Cairo and elsewhere in Egypt, to which Ismail Bey and most of his family fell victims. Owing to the need for competent rulers, Ibrahim Bey and Murad Bey were sent for, and resumed their dual government. They were still in office in 1798 when Napoleon Bonaparte entered Egypt.

=== French occupation ===
==== Object of invasion ====
The ostensible object of the French expedition to Egypt was to reinstate the authority of the Sublime Porte and suppress the Mamluks; in the proclamation, printed with the Arabic types brought from the Propaganda press and issued shortly after the taking of Alexandria, Bonaparte declared that he revered God, Muhammad, and the Qur'an far more than the Mamluks revered them, and argued that all men were equal except so far as they were distinguished by their intellectual and moral excellences—of which the Mamluks had no great share. In the future, all posts in Egypt were to be open to all classes of the inhabitants; the conduct of affairs was to be committed to the men of talent, virtue, and learning; and to prove that the French were sincere Muslims, the overthrow of the papal authority in Rome was suggested.

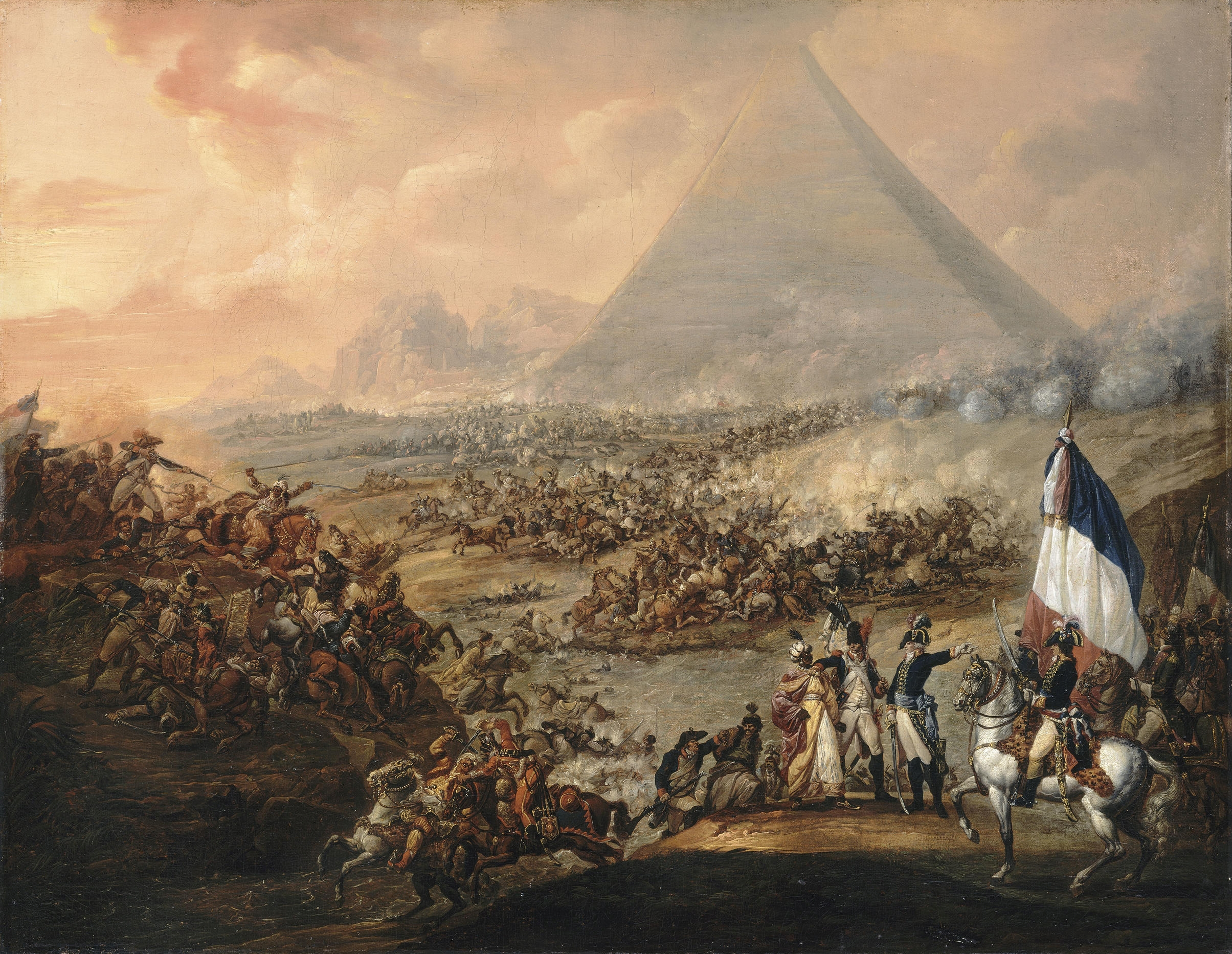
Battle of the Pyramids, Francois-Louis-Joseph Watteau, 1798–1799

That there might be no doubt of the friendly feeling of the French to the Porte, villages and towns which capitulated to the invaders were required to hoist the flags of both the Porte and the French republic, and in the thanksgiving prescribed to the Egyptians for their deliverance from the Mamluks, prayer was to be offered for both the sultan and the French army. It does not appear that the proclamation convinced many Egyptians of the truth of these professions. After the Battle of Embabeh (also commonly known as the Battle of the Pyramids), at which the forces of both Murad Bey and Ibrahim Bey were dispersed, the populace readily plundered the houses of the beys. A deputation was sent from Al-Azhar Mosque to Bonaparte to ascertain his intentions; these proved to be a repetition of the terms of his proclamation, and—though the combination of loyalty to the French with loyalty to the sultan was incompatible—a good understanding was at first established between the invaders and the Egyptians.

A municipal council was established in Cairo, consisting of persons taken from the ranks of the sheiks, the Mamluks, and the French. Soon after, delegates from Alexandria and other important towns were added. This council did little more than register the decrees of the French commander, who continued to exercise dictatorial power.

==== Battle of the Nile ====
The destruction of the French fleet at the Battle of the Nile, and the failure of the French forces sent to Upper Egypt (where they reached the first cataract) to obtain possession of the person of Murad Bey, shook the faith of the Egyptians in their invincibility. In consequence of a series of unwelcome innovations, the relations between conquerors and conquered grew more strained daily, until at last—on the occasion of the introduction of a house tax on 22 October 1798—an insurrection broke out in Cairo. The headquarters of the insurrection were in the University of Azhar. On this occasion, the French general Dupuy, lieutenant-governor of Cairo, was killed. The prompt measures of Bonaparte, aided by the arrival from Alexandria of General Jean Baptiste Kléber, quickly suppressed this rising; but the stabling of French cavalry in the mosque of Azhar gave great and permanent offence.

In consequence of this affair, the deliberative council was suppressed, but on 25 December a fresh proclamation was issued reconstituting the two divans which had been created by the Turks; the special divan was to consist of 14 persons chosen by lot out of 60 government nominees, and was to meet daily. The general divan was to consist of functionaries, and to meet on emergencies.

In consequence of dispatches that reached Bonaparte on 3 January 1799, announcing the intention of the Porte to invade the country with the object of recovering it by force, Bonaparte resolved on his Syrian expedition, and appointed governors for Cairo, Alexandria, and Upper Egypt, to govern during his absence.

==== Defeat of the Turkish army ====
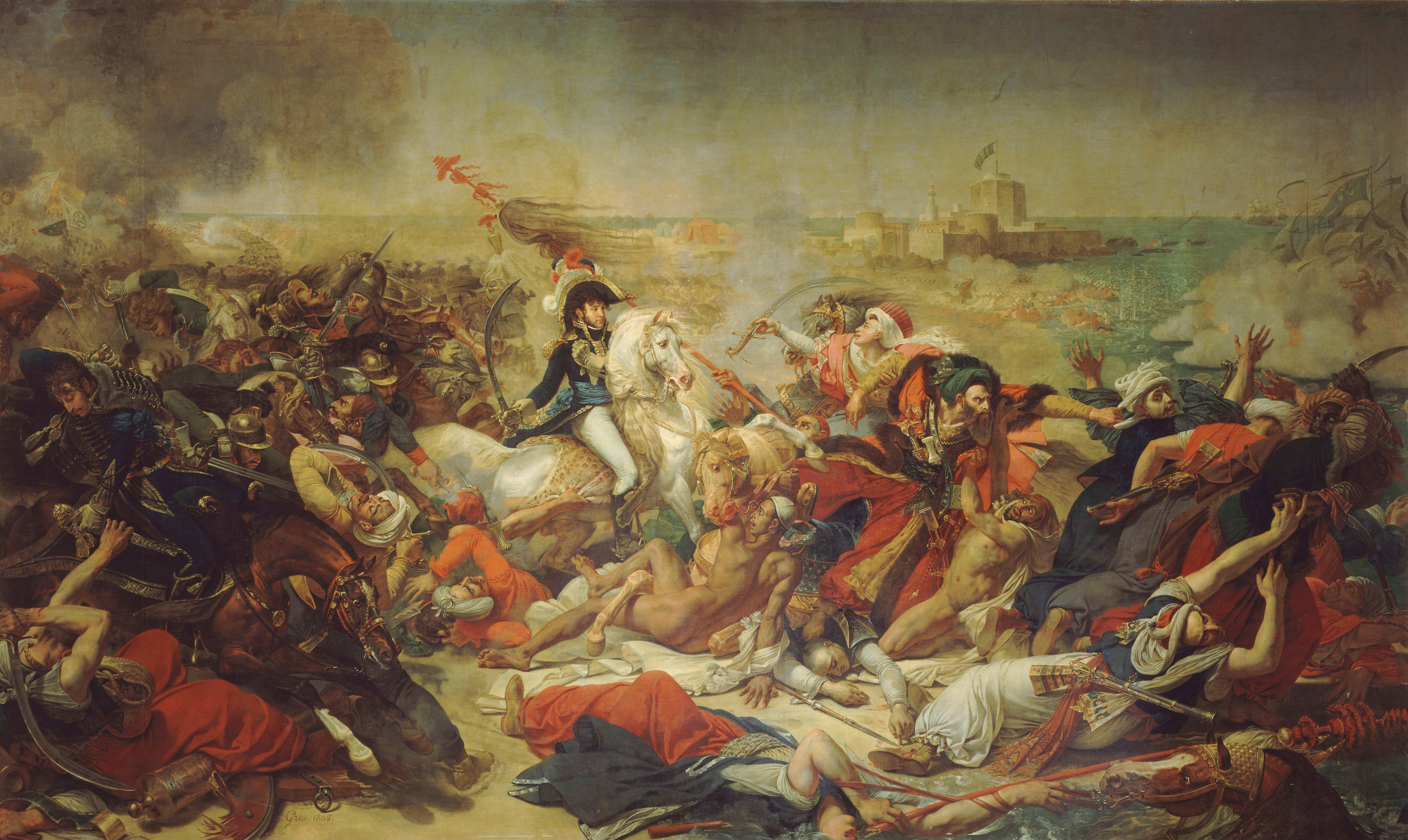
The Battle of Aboukir by Antoine-Jean Gros

Bonaparte returned from that ill-fated expedition at the beginning of June. Murad Bey and Ibrahim Bey had taken advantage of this opportunity to collect their forces and attempt a joint attack on Cairo, but Bonaparte arrived in time to defeat it. In the last week of July, he inflicted a crushing defeat on the Turkish army that had landed at Aboukir, aided by the British fleet commanded by Sir Sidney Smith.

Shortly after his victory, Bonaparte left Egypt, having appointed Kléber to govern in his absence—which he informed the sheiks of Cairo was not to last more than three months. Kléber regarded the condition of the French invaders as extremely perilous, and wrote to inform the French Republic of the facts. A double expedition was sent by the Porte shortly after Bonaparte's departure for the recovery of Egypt: one force being dispatched by sea to Damietta, while another under Yousuf Pasha took the land route from Damascus by al-Arish. The first force had some success, in consequence of which the Turks agreed to a convention on 24 January 1800, by virtue of which the French were to quit Egypt. The Turkish troops advanced to Bilbeis, where they were received by the sheiks from Cairo; the Mamluks also returned to Cairo from their hiding-places.

Before the preparations for the departure of the French were completed, orders came to Smith from the British government forbidding the carrying-out of the convention unless the French army were treated as prisoners of war. When these orders were communicated to Kléber, he cancelled the orders previously given to the troops and proceeded to put the country in a state of defence. His departure, with most of the army, to attack the Turks at Mataria led to riots in Cairo. The national party was unable to gain possession of the citadel, and Kléber, having defeated the Turks, was soon able to return to the capital. On 14 April he bombarded Bulaq, and proceeded to bombard Cairo itself, which was taken the following night. Order was soon restored, and a fine of 12 million francs was imposed upon the rioters. Murad Bey sought an interview with Kléber, and succeeded in obtaining the government of Upper Egypt from him. Murad Bey died shortly afterwards and was succeeded by Osman Bey al-Bardisi.

==== Defeat and retreat of the French ====
On 14 June, Kléber was assassinated by Suleiman al-Halabi, and was said to have been incited to the deed by a Janissary refugee at Jerusalem, who had brought letters to the sheikhs of Al-Azhar. Although they gave him no support, three of the sheikhs were executed by the French as accessories-before-the-fact. The assassin himself was tortured and impaled, despite the promise of a pardon if he named his associates. The command of the army then devolved on General Jacques-Francois Menou, a man who had professed Islam, and who endeavoured to conciliate the Muslim population by various measures—such as excluding all Christians (with the exception of one Frenchman) from the divan, replacing Copts who were in government service with Muslims, and subjecting French residents to taxes. Whatever popularity might have been gained by these measures was counteracted by his declaration of a French protectorate over Egypt, which was to count as a French colony.

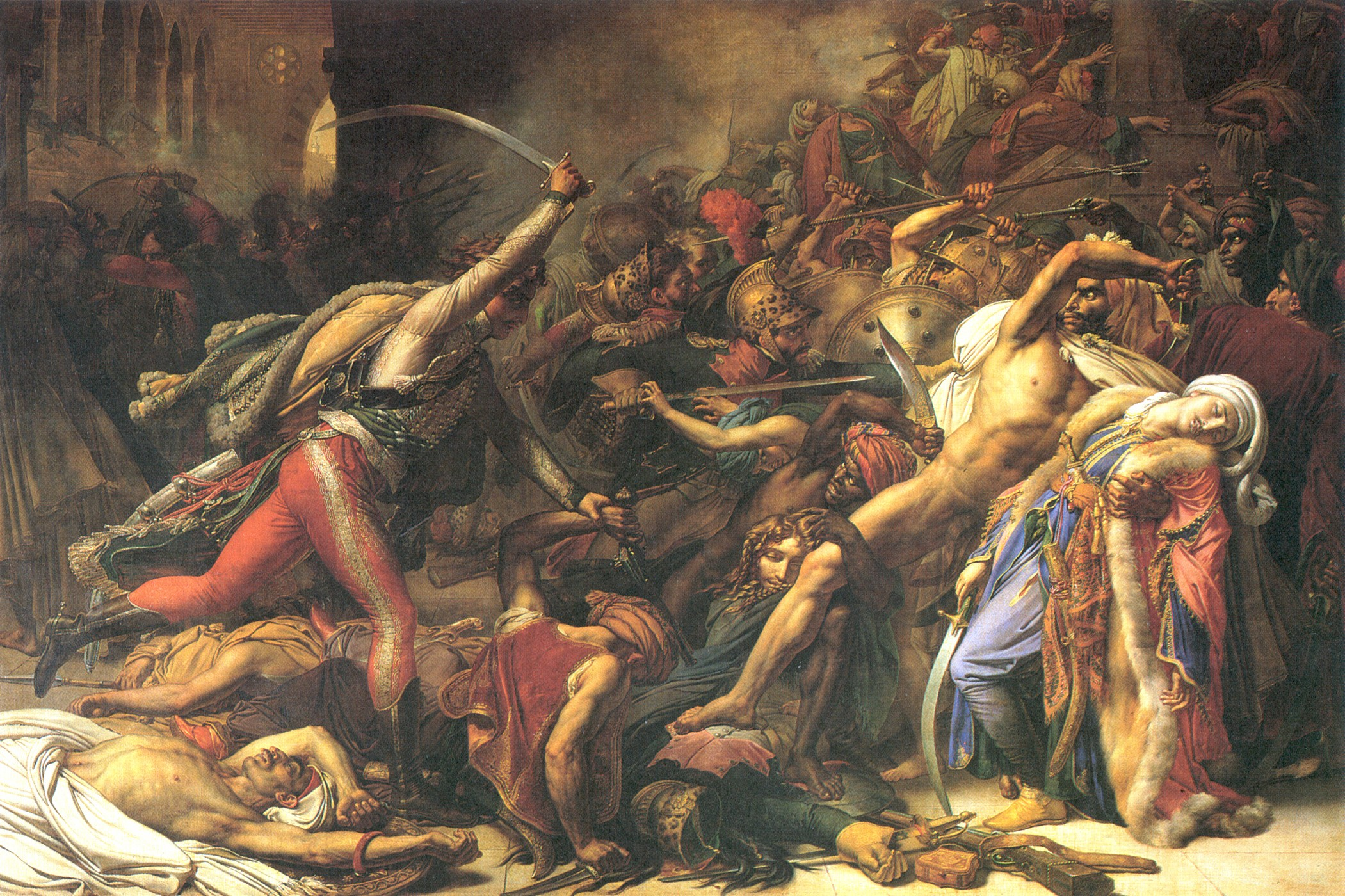
The Revolt of Cairo by Anne-Louis Girodet, 1810. The painting depicts the Revolt of Cairo against the French on 21 October 1798.

In the first weeks of March 1801, a British expeditionary force under Sir Ralph Abercromby effected a landing at Abu Qir, and proceeded to invest Alexandria, where they were attacked by Menou; the French were repulsed, but Abercromby was mortally wounded in the action. On the 25th, fresh Ottoman reinforcements arrived with the fleet of the Kapudan Pasha Küçük Hüseyin Pasha. A combined Anglo-Ottoman force was sent to take Rosetta. On 30 May, Augustin Daniel Belliard, the French commander in Cairo, was assailed on two sides by British forces under General John Hely-Hutchinson and Ottoman troops under Yusuf Pasha; after negotiations, Belliard agreed to evacuate Cairo and to sail with his 13,734 remaining soldiers to France. On 30 August, Menou was compelled to accept similar conditions, and his force of 10,000 men left Alexandria for Europe in September. This was the termination of the French occupation of Egypt, as the French in defeat would never return to Egypt during Napoleon's rule. The chief permanent monument of the occupation was the Description de l'Egypte, compiled by the French savants who accompanied the expedition.

=== Egypt under Muhammad Ali ===
==== Muhammad Ali's seizure of power ====
Massacre of the Mamelukes by Horace Vernet, 1819

Soon after the French evacuated Egypt, the country became the scene of more severe troubles, a consequence of the Ottomans' attempts to destroy the power of the Mamluks. In defiance of promises to the British Government, orders were transmitted from Constantinople to Hüseyin Pasha to ensnare and put to death the principal beys. According to the Egyptian contemporary historian al-Jabarti, they were invited to an entertainment on board the Turkish flagship and then attacked; however, Sir Robert Wilson and M.F. Mengin stated that they were fired upon in open boats in Abu Qir Bay. They offered resistance, but were overpowered, and some killed; others were made prisoners. Among the prisoners was Osman Bey al-Bardisi, who was severely wounded. The British General Hutchinson, informed of this treachery, immediately took threatening measures against the Turks, causing them to surrender the killed, wounded, and imprisoned Egyptians to him. At the same time, Yusuf Pasha arrested all the beys in Cairo, but soon the British compelled him to release them.

Koca Hüsrev Mehmed Pasha was the first Ottoman governor of Egypt after the expulsion of the French. The form of government, however, was not the same as that before the French invasion, for the Mamluks were not reinstated. The pasha, and ultimately Sultan Selim III, repeatedly tried to either ensnare them or to beguile them into submission. These efforts failing, Husrev took the field and a Turkish detachment 7,000 strong was dispatched against the Mamluks to Damanhur—whence they had descended from Upper Egypt—and was defeated by a small force under either Al-Alfi or his lieutenant Al-Bardisi. Their ammunition and guns fell into the hands of the Mamluks. This led to a long civil war between the Albanians, Mamluks, and Ottomans.

One Mamluk, Al-Alfi was reported by al-Jabarti to marry Bedouin women a number of times, sending those back he did not like and keeping those that pleased him. A number of Bedouin women mourned his death. Muhammad Ali took advantage of Al-Alfi's death to try to assert authority over the Bedouins. Two Ottoman era Mamluks, Iwaz Bey's Mamluk Yusuf Bey al-Jazzar and Jazzar Pasha were known for massacring Bedouins and given the name "butcher" (al-Jazzar) for it. After Muhammad Ali defeated the Mamluks and Bedouin, the Bedouin went on a destructive rampage against the Egyptian fellahin peasantry, destroying and looting crops and massacred 200 townsmen in Belbeis in Al-Sharqiya province and also rampaging through al-Qaliubiyya province.

==== Campaign against the Saudis (1811–1818) ====
Acknowledging the sovereignty of the Ottoman sultan and at his command, Muhammad Ali dispatched an army of 20,000 men (including 2,000 horses) under the command of his son Tusun, a youth of sixteen, against the Saudis in the Ottoman–Saudi War. By the end of 1811, Tusun had received reinforcements and captured Medina after a prolonged siege. He next took Jeddah and Mecca, defeating the Saudi beyond the latter and capturing their general.

After the death of the Saudi leader Saud, Muhammad Ali concluded a treaty with Saud's son and successor, Abdullah I in 1815.

Tusun returned to Egypt on hearing of the military revolt at Cairo, but died in 1816 at the early age of twenty. Muhammad Ali, dissatisfied with the treaty concluded with the Saudis, and with the non-fulfillment of certain of its clauses, determined to send another army to Arabia. This expedition, under his eldest son Ibrahim Pasha, left in the autumn of 1816 and captured the Saudi capital of Diriyah in 1818.

==== Reforms (1808–1823) ====
During Muhammad Ali's absence in Arabia his representative at Cairo had completed the confiscation, begun in 1808, of almost all the lands belonging to private individuals, who were forced to accept instead inadequate pensions. By this revolutionary method of land nationalization Muhammad Ali became proprietor of nearly all the soil of Egypt. The pasha also attempted to reorganize his troops on European lines, but this led to a formidable mutiny in Cairo. The revolt was reduced by presents to the chiefs of the insurgents, and Muhammad Ali ordered that the sufferers by the disturbances should receive compensation from the treasury. The project of the Nizam Gedid (New System) was, in consequence of this mutiny, abandoned for a time.

While Ibrahim was engaged in the second Arabian campaign the pasha turned his attention to strengthening the Egyptian economy. He created state monopolies over the chief products of the country. He set up a number of factories and began digging in 1819 a new canal to Alexandria, called the Mahmudiya (after the reigning sultan of Turkey). The old canal had long fallen into decay, and the necessity of a safe channel between Alexandria and the Nile was much felt. The conclusion in 1838 of a commercial treaty with Turkey, negotiated by Sir Henry Bulwer (Lord Dalling), struck a deathblow to the system of monopolies, though the application of the treaty to Egypt was delayed for some years.

Another notable fact in the economic progress of the country was the development of the cultivation of cotton in the Delta in 1822 and onwards. The cotton grown previously had been brought from the Sudan by Maho Bey. By organizing the new industry, within a few years Muhammad Ali was able to extract considerable revenues.

Efforts were made to promote education and the study of medicine. To European merchants, on whom he was dependent for the sale of his exports, Muhammad Ali showed much favor, and under his influence the port of Alexandria again rose into importance. It was also under Muhammad Ali's encouragement that the overland transit of goods from Europe to India via Egypt was resumed.

Sultan Mahmud II was also planning reforms borrowed from the West, and Muhammad Ali, who had had plenty of opportunity of observing the superiority of European methods of warfare, was determined to anticipate the sultan in the creation of a fleet and an army on European lines.

Before the outbreak of the Greek War of Independence in 1821, he had already expended much time and energy in organizing a fleet and in training, under the supervision of French instructors, native officers and artificers.

By 1823, he had succeeded in carrying out the reorganization of his army on European lines, the turbulent Turkish and Albanian elements being replaced by Sudanese and fellahin. The effectiveness of the new force was demonstrated in the suppression of an 1823 revolt of the Albanians in Cairo by six disciplined Sudanese regiments; after which Muhammad Ali was no more troubled with military mutinies.

==== Economy ====
Egypt under Muhammad Ali in the early 19th century had the fifth most productive cotton industry in the world, in terms of the number of spindles per capita. The industry was initially driven by machinery that relied on traditional energy sources, such as animal power, water wheels, and windmills, which were also the principle energy sources in Western Europe up until around 1870. While steam power had been experimented with in Ottoman Egypt by engineer Taqi ad-Din Muhammad ibn Ma'ruf in 1551, when he invented a steam jack driven by a rudimentary steam turbine, it was under Muhammad Ali in the early 19th century that steam engines were introduced to Egyptian industrial manufacturing. While there was a lack of coal deposits in Egypt, prospectors searched for coal deposits there, and manufactured boilers which were installed in Egyptian industries such as ironworks, textile manufacturing, paper mills and hulling mills. Coal was also imported from overseas, at similar prices to what imported coal cost in France, until the 1830s, when Egypt gained access to coal sources in Lebanon, which had a yearly coal output of 4,000 tons. Compared to Western Europe, Egypt also had superior agriculture and an efficient transport network through the Nile. Economic historian Jean Batou argues that the necessary economic conditions for rapid industrialization existed in Egypt during the 1820s–1830s, as well as for the adoption of oil as a potential energy source for its steam engines later in the 19th century.

==== Invasion of Libya and Sudan (1820) ====
In 1820 Muhammad Ali gave orders to commence the conquest of eastern Libya. Ali's intentions for Sudan was to extend his rule southward, to capture the valuable caravan trade bound for the Red Sea, disperse Mamluks who had fled south, and to secure the rich gold mines which he believed to exist in Sennar. He also saw in the campaign a means of getting rid of his disaffected troops, and of obtaining a sufficient number of captives to form the nucleus of the new army.

The forces destined for this service were led by Ismail Kamil Pasha, the youngest son of Muhammad Ali. They consisted of between 4,000 and 5,000 men, being Turks and Arabs. They left Cairo in July 1820. Nubia did not put up much of a fight, the Shaigiya tribe immediately beyond the province of Dongola were defeated, the remnant of the Mamluks dispersed, and Sennar was destroyed.

==== Expansion into Somalia (1821) ====
Although nominally part of the Ottoman Empire since 1554, between 1821 and 1841, Muhammad Ali, Pasha of Egypt, came to control Yemen and the sahil, with Zeila included. After the Egyptians withdrew from the Yemeni seaboard in 1841, Haj Ali Shermerki, a successful and ambitious Somali merchant, purchased from them executive rights over Zeila. Shermerki's governorship had an instant effect on the city, as he maneuvered to monopolize as much of the regional trade as possible, with his sights set as far as Harar and the Ogaden. In 1845, Shermerki deployed a few matchlock men to wrest control of neighboring Berbera from that town's then feuding Somali authorities. This alarmed the Harari emir of Harar, who, having already been at loggerheads with Shermerki over fiscal matters, was concerned about the ramifications that these movements might ultimately have on his own city's commerce. The emir consequently urged Berbera's leaders to reconcile and mount a resistance against Shermerki's troops. Shermerki was later succeeded as Governor of Zeila by Abu Bakr Pasha, a local Afar statesman.

In 1874–75, the Egyptians obtained a firman from the Ottomans by which they secured claims over the city. At the same time, the Egyptians received British recognition of their nominal jurisdiction as far east as Cape Guardafui. When the Egyptian garrison in Harar was evacuated in 1885, Zeila became caught up in the competition between the Tadjoura-based French and the British for control of the strategic Gulf of Aden littoral. I.M. Lewis mentions that "by the end of 1885 Britain was preparing to resist an expected French landing at Zeila." However, the two powers decided instead to turn to negotiations.

==== Ahmad Revolt (1824) ====
In 1824 a native rebellion broke out in Upper Egypt headed by Ahmed, an inhabitant of al-Salimiyyah, a village situated a few miles above Thebes. He proclaimed himself a prophet, and was soon followed by between 20,000 and 30,000 insurgents, mostly peasants, but some of them deserters from the Nizam Gedid, for that force was yet in a half-organized state. The insurrection was crushed by Muhammad Ali, and about one fourth of Ahmad's followers perished, but he himself escaped. The subsequent years saw an imposition of order across Egypt and Ali's new highly trained and disciplined forces spread across the nation.

==== Greek campaign (1824–1828) ====
Ali's foresight in reforming his military forces was rewarded by the invitation of the sultan to help him in the task of subduing the Greek insurgents, offering as reward the pashaliks of the Morea and of Syria. In the autumn of 1824 a fleet of 60 Egyptian warships carrying a large force of 17,000 disciplined troops concentrated in Suda Bay, and, in the following March, with Ibrahim as commander-in-chief landed in the Morea.

His naval superiority wrested from the Greeks the command of a great deal of the sea, on which the fate of the insurrection ultimately depended, while on land the Greek irregular bands, having largely soundly beaten the Porte's troops, had finally met a worthy foe in Ibrahim's disciplined troops. The history of the events that led up to the Battle of Navarino. The withdrawal of the Egyptians from the Morea was ultimately due to the action of Admiral Sir Edward Codrington, who early in August 1828 appeared before Alexandria and induced the pasha to sign a convention undertaking to recall Ibrahim and his army.

==== War with the Sultan (1831–1841) ====
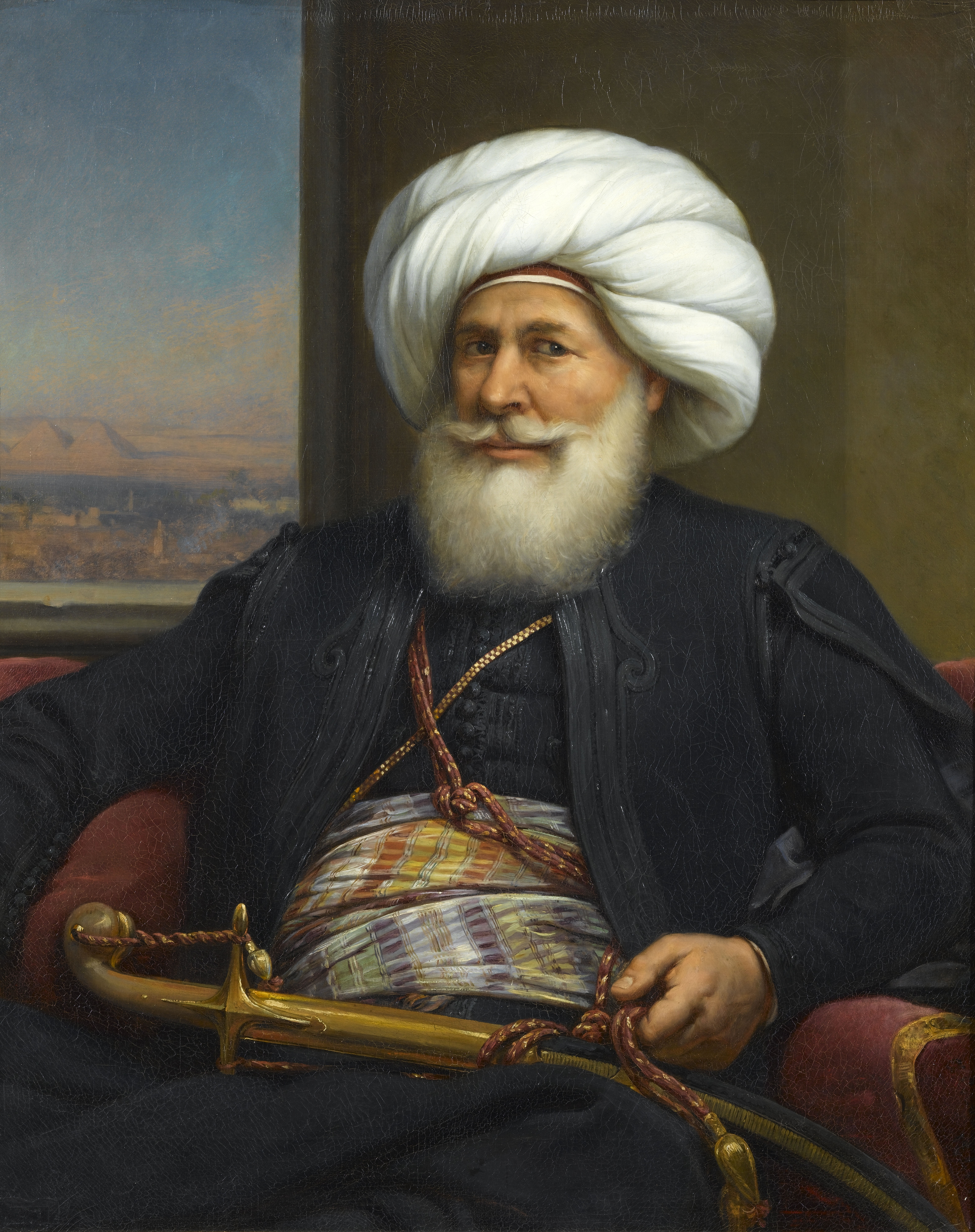
Muhammad Ali, Viceroy of Egypt, painting by Auguste Couder (1841, Palace of Versailles)

Ali went to war against the sultan on the pretext of chastising the ex-Mamluk Abdullah Pasha of Acre, for refusing to send back Egyptian fugitives from the effects of Muhammad Ali's reforms. The true reason was the refusal of Sultan Mahmud II to hand over Syria according to agreement. For ten years from this date the relations of sultan and pasha remained in the forefront of the questions which agitated the diplomatic world. It was not only the very existence of the Ottoman Empire that seemed to be at stake, but Egypt itself had become more than ever an object of attention, to British statesmen especially, and in the issue of the struggle were involved the interests of the British Empire in the two routes to India by the Isthmus of Suez and the valley of the Euphrates.

Ibrahim, who once more commanded in his father's name, launched another brilliant campaign beginning with the storming of Acre on 27 May 1832, and culminating in the rout and capture of Reşid Mehmed Pasha at Konya on 22 December. Soon after he was blocked by the intervention of Russia, however. As the result of endless discussions between the representatives of the powers, the Porte and the pasha, the Convention of Kütahya was signed on 14 May 1833, by which the sultan agreed to bestow on Muhammad Ali the pashaliks of Syria, Damascus, Aleppo and Itcheli, together with the district of Adana.

Muhammad Ali now ruled over a virtually independent empire, subject only to a moderate tribute, stretching from the Sudan to the Taurus Mountains. However the unsound foundations of his authority were not long in revealing themselves. Scarcely a year from the signing of the Convention of Kütahya the application by Ibrahim of Egyptian methods of government, notably of the monopolies and conscription, had driven Syrian Druze and Sunni Arabs, who had welcomed him as a deliverer, into revolt. The unrest was suppressed by Muhammad Ali in person, and the Syrians were terrorized, but their discontent encouraged Sultan Mahmud to hope for revenge, and a renewal of the conflict was only staved off by the anxious efforts of the European powers.

In the spring of 1839 the sultan ordered his army, concentrated under Reshid in the border district of Bir on the Euphrates, to advance over the Syrian frontier. Ibrahim, seeing his flank menaced, attacked it at Nezib on 24 June. Once more, however, the Ottomans were utterly routed. Six days later, before the news reached Constantinople, Mahmud died.

Now, with the defeat of the Ottomans and the conquest of Syria, Muhammad Ali had reached the height of his power, controlling Egypt, the Sudan, and Syria. He saw the Ottoman armies collapse or fall into disorganization after their defeat in Syria, and it looked like the Middle East and Anatolia were his for the taking.

With the Ottoman Empire at the feet of Muhammad Ali, the European powers were greatly alarmed and now put into action a plan that had been prepared to meet a contingency which had been long foreseen. Their intervention during the Oriental Crisis of 1840 was prompt, and they made short work of Muhammad Ali's army. But the Western Powers had no intention of removing Ali and the block he placed on Ottoman power. Thus, though the peace treaty was harsh, it left the Muhammad Ali dynasty in power.

==== End of Muhammad Ali's rule ====
The government of the pashalik of Egypt was made hereditary in the family of Muhammad Ali in 1841.

Various restrictions were laid upon Muhammad Ali, emphasizing his position as vassal. He was forbidden to maintain a fleet and his army was not to exceed 18,000 men. The pasha was no longer a figure in European politics, but he continued to occupy himself with his improvements in Egypt. The long wars combined with a murrain of cattle in 1842 and a destructive Nile flood. In 1843 there was a plague of locusts where whole villages were depopulated.

In 1844–45 there was some improvement in the condition of the country as a result of financial reforms the pasha executed. Muhammad Ali, who had been granted the honorary rank of grand vizier in 1842, paid a visit to Istanbul in 1846, where he became reconciled to his old enemy Khosrev Pasha, whom he had not seen since he spared his life at Cairo in 1803. In 1847 Muhammad Ali laid the foundation stone of the great bridge across the Nile at the beginning of the Delta. Towards the end of 1847, the aged pasha's previously sharp mind began to give way, and by the following June he was no longer capable of administering the government. In September 1848 Ibrahim was acknowledged by the Porte as ruler of the pashalik, but he died in November.

=== Muhammad Ali's successors ===
On Ibrahim's death in November 1848 the government of Egypt fell to his nephew Abbas I, the son of Tusun Abbasad. Abbas put an end to the system of commercial monopolies, and during his reign the railway from Alexandria to Cairo was begun at the instigation of the British government. Opposed to European ways, Abbas lived in great seclusion. After a reign of less than six years he was murdered in July 1854 by two of his slaves.

He was succeeded by his uncle Sa'id Pasha, the favorite son of Muhammad Ali, who lacked the strength of mind or physical health needed to execute the beneficent projects which he conceived. He had a genuine regard for the welfare of the fellahin, and a land law of 1858 secured for them an acknowledgment of freehold as against the crown.

The pasha was much under French influence, and in 1854 was induced to grant to the French engineer Ferdinand de Lesseps a concession for the construction of the Suez Canal.

In January 1863 Sa'id Pasha died and was succeeded by his nephew Isma'il, a son of Ibrahim Pasha.

The reign of Isma'il, from 1863 to 1879, was for a while hailed as a new era into modern Egypt. He attempted vast schemes of reform, but these coupled with his personal extravagance led to bankruptcy, and the later part of his reign is historically important simply for its leading to European intervention in, and occupation of, Egypt.

=== Khedivate ===
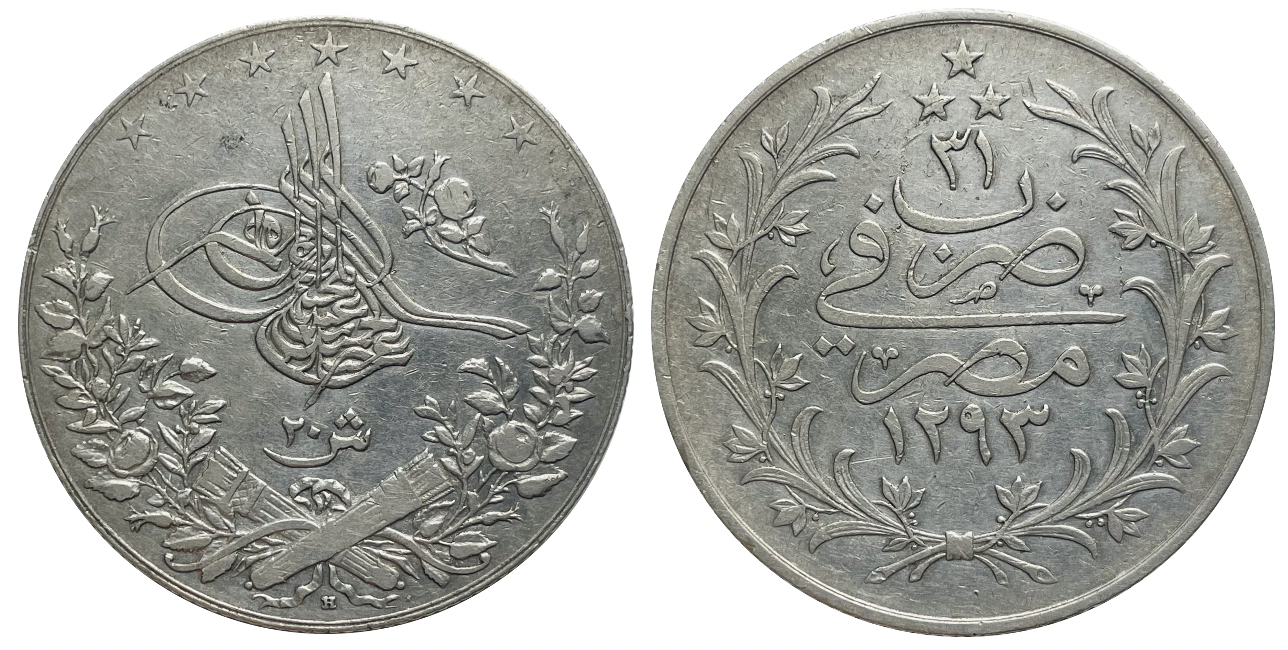
20 qirsh of Abdul Hamid II struck in Egypt (Ottoman Turkish: مصر, romanized: Mıṣr), issued in 1896, his 20th regnal year

In 1866 Ismail was granted by the sultan a firman obtained on condition of the increase of the tribute from £376,000 to £720,000. In the next year another firman bestowed upon him the title of khedive in lieu of that of wali, marking the end of Egypt as a formal Ottoman province.

Isma'il ruled the Khedivate of Egypt until his deposition in 1879. His rule is closely connected to the building of the Suez Canal. On his accession, he refused to ratify the concessions to the Canal company made by Sa'id, and the question was referred in 1864 to the arbitration of Napoleon III, who awarded £3,800,000 to the company as compensation for their losses. When the canal finally opened, Isma'il held a festival of unprecedented scope, inviting dignitaries from around the world.

These developments, together with the costly war against Yohannes IV of Ethiopia, left Egypt in deep debt to the European powers. A national debt of over one hundred million pounds sterling (as opposed to three millions when he became viceroy) had been incurred by the khedive, whose fundamental idea of liquidating his borrowings was to borrow at increased interest. When he could raise no more loans, he sold his Suez Canal shares (in 1875) to the British Government for only £3,976,582; this was immediately followed by the beginning of foreign intervention.

In December 1875, Stephen Cave was sent out by the British government to inquire into the finances of Egypt, and in April 1876 his report was published, advising that in view of the waste and extravagance it was necessary for foreign Powers to interfere in order to restore credit. The result was the establishment of the Caisse de la Dette Publique.

With the country becoming increasingly lawless, the British and French governments pressured the Ottoman Sultan Abdul Hamid II to depose Isma'il Pasha, and this was done on 26 June 1879. The more pliable Tewfik Pasha, Isma'il's son, was made his successor. A large military demonstration in September 1881 forced the Khedive Tewfiq to dismiss his Prime Minister. In April 1882 France and Great Britain sent warships to Alexandria to bolster the khedive amidst a turbulent climate. Tewfik moved to Alexandria for fear of his own safety as army officers led by Ahmed Urabi began to take control of the government. By June Egypt was in the hands of nationalists opposed to European domination of the country. A British naval Bombardment of Alexandria had little effect on the opposition which led to the Anglo-Egyptian War. The British succeeded in defeating the Egyptian Army at Tell El Kebir in September 1882 and took control of the country putting Tewfik back in control. The Khedivate of Egypt remained under British military occupation until the establishment of the Sultanate of Egypt in 1914.

== Historiography ==
There are six surviving manuscripts of the Turkish version of the 18th century history Tarih-i Misr by Mehmed B. Yusuf. Critical studies of the different versions of the manuscripts are incomplete or have not been done. The only known surviving Arabic version is said to be in the collection of the Russian Academy of Sciences in Saint Petersburg. The Turkish version, covering the period up to around 1717, was probably more widely circulated given the number of surviving manuscripts. Austrian orientalist J. von Hammer refers to the text in his history of the Ottoman Empire, calling it "the most detailed and estimable of all Ottoman histories of Egypt". Despite the fact that a full critical study was never completed, historians and Orientalists continued to cite the history following Hammer.

== Administrative divisions ==
After conquering Egypt, the Ottomans retained the divisions created by the Mamluks, which were structured into 13 sub-provinces comprising 24 qirats. Unlike the situation in other Ottoman provinces, the term sanjak did not carry territorial connotations, as the timar system was not applied there. The rank of sanjak-bey, which was standard in the Empire, was not used in Egypt.

The thirteen sub-provinces were:

1. Minufiyya
2. Qalyub
3. Gharbiyya
4. Mansura
5. Sharqiyya
6. Beheira
7. Giza
8. Fayyum
9. Atfih
10. Ushmunayn
11. Manfalut
12. al-Bahnasa
13. Jirja

Additionally, there was a short-lived sub-province named Hatt-ı Üstuva meaning Equator in Ottoman Turkish, which was established as a vilayet and existed from 1872 to 1882 covering the areas of today's southern South Sudan and Northern Uganda, including cities like Lado and Wadelai.

Evliya Çelebi in the 17th century mentioned that Egypt had twelve subdivisions or sanjaks, all governed by Beys. The subdvisions were the following: Upper Egypt, Jirja, Ibrim, Al Wahat (The Oasis), Menfelut, Sharqiye, Gharbiye, Menufiye, Mansuriye, Kulubiye, Bahire and Dimyat.

According to the 1701-1702 defter, the Ottoman province of Egypt had the following subdivisions with its governors:

1. Cairo (Kahire) - Seat of the Pasha
2. Girga (Decercâ)
3. Jeddah (Cidde-i Ma'mûre) - Also comprised the Eyalet of Habesh
4. Medina (Medine-i Münevvere) - Sharif of Mecca and Medina
5. Emir of the pilgrimage of Egypt (Mîr-Haclık-ı Mısır) (official who handled the Hajj affairs)

== List of rulers ==
=== List of Grand Viziers of Egypt (1857–1878) ===
- Zulfiqar Pasha (1857–1858) (1st term)
- Mustafa Naili (1858–1861)
- Zulfiqar Pasha (1861–1864) (2nd term)
- Raghib Pasha (1864–1866) (1st term)
- Muhammad Sharif Pasha (1866–1867) (1st term)
- Raghib Pasha (1867–1868) (2nd term)
- Muhammad Sharif Pasha (1868–1872) (2nd term)
- Nubar Pasha (1872)
- Muhammad Tawfiq Pasha (1872–1878)

== See also ==
- List of Ottoman governors of Egypt
- Ottoman architecture in Egypt
- History of modern Egypt
- Turco-Egyptian conquest of Sudan (1820–1824)
- Egyptian intervention in the Crimean War
