= Ismail Siddiq =

Egyptian statesman (1830–1876)

Minister of Finance
- In office 1868 – November 1876
- Monarch: Khedive Ismail

Personal details
- Born: 1830
- Died: 1876 (aged 45–46)
- Parent: Dunalı Mustafa Ağa (father)

Ismail Siddiq, also known as Ismail Siddiq Pasha and Ismail Al Mufatsh, (1830–1876) was an Egyptian statesman who served as the finance minister from 1868 to 1876. He was one of the prominent members of the dhawāt which refers to noble individuals occupying major offices in Egypt at that period.

== Biography ==
Siddiq was born in 1830. His mother who was an Arab slave was the wet nurse of Khedive Ismail who ruled Egypt between 1863 and 1879. Siddiq's father was Dunalı Mustafa Ağa, a soldier served in the army of Ibrahim Pasha, father of Khedive Ismail.

Siddiq was inspector general responsible for Lower Egypt and was named inspector general of Egypt in 1866. He was a member of the three-member regency council which was formed in June 1867 as a result of the minority of Khedive Ismail's son Tewfik. Siddiq was appointed head of finance department in 1868 being the first non-Turk who held these two significant offices for the first time. He also served as a financial agent for Khedive Ismail dealing with his personal finance.

In November 1876 Siddiq was arrested by Khedive Ismail in Saray al Jazirah and sent to exile in Dongola, Sudan, where he was put into a prison. According to the official announcement few weeks after this incident Siddiq died there, but Wageeh Wahba of Egyptian Today newspaper argues that Siddiq was murdered by the Khedive's forces, and his body was thrown into the Nile river.

In 1866 Siddiq constructed a palace in Lazoughli square, Cairo, called Ismail Siddiq Pasha Al Mufatsh Palace.
