= Momtaz El-Saeed =

Egyptian civil servant

Momtaz Saeed Abu El Nour

Minister of Finance
- In office December 2011 – 5 January 2013
- President: Mohamad Morsi
- Prime Minister: Kamal Ganzouri; Hesham Qandil
- Preceded by: Hazem Al Beblawi
- Succeeded by: Morsi Hegazy

Personal details
- Born: 1948 (age 77–78)
- Party: Independent
- Education: Ain Shams University

Momtaz El-Saeed (also known as Momtaz Saeed Abu El Nour; born 1948) is an Egyptian civil servant who once served in the government of Egypt as minister of finance from 2011 to 2013.

== Early life and education ==
Saeed was born in 1948. He obtained a bachelor's degree in accounting from Ain Shams University in 1971.

== Career ==
During the late 1990s, Saeed served as general director of the Egyptian finance ministry's budget division. He was the ministry undersecretary during the term of Mubarak-era finance minister Youssef Boutros Ghali. Prior to being appointed minister by Prime Minister Kamal Ganzouri in the interim government in December 2011, Saeed served as the second-in-command at Egypt's finance ministry. Saeed was called from retirement in the middle of 2011 to work as deputy finance minister under Finance Minister Hazem Al Beblawi.

On 2 August 2012, Saeed was sworn in as part of Prime Minister Hisham Qandil's cabinet. He was one of the independent ministers in the cabinet. Saeed leans towards the conservative side, and no dramatic policy changes were expected from him. He prepared Egypt's 2012-2013 state budget. Saeed was criticized by the Freedom and Justice Party (FJP) of the Muslim Brotherhood, who claimed that he delayed presenting the budget to the Egyptian parliament by two months deliberately. One official of the FJP called the budget that Saeed drafted "a plot" to ensure that President Morsi fails," and that it was the same as every budget during the era of President Hosni Mubarak. Saeed was replaced by Morsi Hegazy as finance minister in a cabinet reshuffle on 5 January 2013.

=== Egyptian economic crisis ===
Following the Egyptian Revolution of 2011, Egypt's economy entered into decline, leading Egypt's central bank to sell dollars in order to bolster Egypt's pound. Egypt's economy faces a balance of payments crisis, and is also being further undermined due to high state borrowing costs.

On 13 August 2012, Saeed announced that Qatar was expected to deposit $500 million in the Egyptian central bank to help alleviate Egypt's economic crisis. He also said that Egyptian officials had discussed with Libya the possibility of Libya supporting Egypt's depleted finances.

On 22 August 2012, it was reported that following a meeting with Managing Director Christine Lagarde of the International Monetary Fund, Saeed denied rumors pertaining to an imminent devaluation of the Egyptian pound. He also said that devaluation of the pound was not a condition for a $4.8 billion loan that Egypt was requesting from the IMF. Saeed also added that the IMF would not interfere with the Egyptian government’s new reform policies, and that the loan is an indication that Egypt's economy is heading forward, and it should encourage foreign investment. In regards to the loan, Saeed said that Egypt is "entitled to assistance when going through a crisis" because Egypt is one of the founding members of the IMF and contributes to the IMF's capital. El-Saeed explained that the loan is mainly based on an economic and social reform program that Egypt prepared in order to escape from Egypt's economic crisis.

=== Collection of taxes ===
Saeed announced in May 2012 that he ordered the Egyptian tax authority to implement legal changes that would allow Egypt to collect billions of pounds of unpaid taxes, and would speed up collection and facilitate taxation of small businesses. El-Saeed said that Egypt is owed 150 billion pounds in uncollected taxes.

== See also ==
- Elections in Egypt
- List of political parties in Egypt
- Timeline of the 2011-2012 Egyptian revolution under Supreme Council of the Armed Forces
