= Mahmoud Sami Elbaroudi =

Prime Minister of Egypt in 1882

Mahmoud Sami Al Baroudi
- محمود سامي البارودي
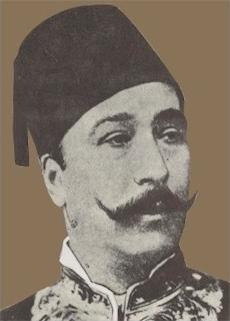

5th Prime Minister of Egypt
- In office 4 February 1882 – 26 May 1882
- Monarch: Tewfik Pasha
- Preceded by: Mohamed Sherif Pasha
- Succeeded by: Raghib Pasha

Personal details
- Born: 11 June 1839 Cairo, Egypt
- Died: 11 December 1904 (aged 65) Cairo, Khedivate of Egypt

Military service
- Allegiance: (Ottoman Egypt) Khedivate of Egypt
- Branch/service: Egyptian Army

Mahmoud Sami Al Baroudi (Arabic: محمود سامي البارودي; June 11, 1839 – December 11, 1904) was an Egyptian statesman and prominent poet who served as the fifth Prime Minister of Egypt from 4 February 1882 to 26 May 1882. He was married to a member of the Yeghen family, descendants of Mohammed Ali pashas’s sister.His family title, Al Baroudy, is derived from the city of Itay Al Barud.

He was known as rab alseif wel qalam رب السيف و القلم ("lord of sword and pen"). His father belonged to an Ottoman-Egyptian family while his mother was a Greek woman who converted to Islam upon marrying his father.

== Works ==
He wrote more than 370 poems, for instance: " Everyone who is alive, will die." (In Arabic:كُلّ حيّ سيموت).

Elbaroudy was one of the prominen leaders of the Urabi Revolution and was exiled for his role.

Political offices
Preceded by Mohamed Sherif Pasha	Prime Minister of Egypt; 1882	Succeeded by Raghib Pasha
