= Fayyad Abdel Moneim =

Egyptian academic and economist (born 1957)

Minister of Finance
- In office 7 May 2013 – 16 July 2013
- President: Mohamad Morsi
- Prime Minister: Hesham Qandil
- Preceded by: Morsi El Sayed Hegazy
- Succeeded by: Ahmed Galal

Personal details
- Born: 1957 (age 68–69)
- Party: Independent
- Education: Al Azhar University

Fayyad Abdel Moneim (born 1957) is an Egyptian academic and economist who served as finance minister briefly from 7 May to 16 July 2013.

== Early life and education ==
Moneim was born in 1957. He received a bachelor's degree in commerce in 1980. He holds a master's degree, which he received from Al Azhar University in 1993. He also holds a PhD, which he again received from Al Azhar University in Islamic finance in 1999. The title of his PhD thesis is "an evaluation of the economic performance of banks, with application to the Islamic banks in Egypt."

== Career ==
Moneim served as the manager and advisor of the Islamic Research Center at the International Islamic Investment and Development Bank in Cairo. He was also a consultant to various Islamic finance institutions. In addition, he was a financial consultant at Dar El Ifta that is a public institution, issuing fatwas (religious edicts). He served as the legal inspection committee secretary of the Islamic International Bank from 1993 to 2003. He was a member of the board of Islamic studies at the faculty of science at Cairo University. He worked as a professor of economics at Al Azhar University until May 2013. On 7 May 2013, he was appointed finance minister to the cabinet led by Prime Minister Hesham Qandil. He replaced Morsi El Sayed Hegazy in the post. Moneim's term ended on 16 July when interim government led by the Prime Minister Hazem Al Beblawi was formed.
