= Ahmed Kouchouk =

Egyptian economist and politician

Minister of Finance
- Incumbent
- Assumed office 1 July 2024
- Prime Minister: Mostafa Madbouly
- Preceded by: Mohamed Maait

Personal details
- Born: 23 September 1976 (age 50) Cairo, Egypt
- Education: American University in Cairo (BS); University of York (MA); Harvard Kennedy School (MPA)

Ahmed Kouchouk (born September 23, 1976 in Cairo) is an Egyptian economist and government minister. He is the current Minister of Finance since 2024.

Political offices
Preceded by Mostafa Madbouly	Minister of Finance; 2024-	Succeeded by incumbent
