= Samir Radwan =

Egyptian politician (1942–2026)

- سمير رضوان

Minister of Finance
- In office 31 January 2011 – 17 July 2011
- President: Hosni Mubarak; Mohamed Hussein Tantawi (acting)
- Prime Minister: Ahmed Shafik
- Preceded by: Youssef Boutros Ghali
- Succeeded by: Hazem Al Beblawi

Personal details
- Born: 1942 Koum Hamada, Beheira, Egypt
- Died: 18 August 2026 (aged 84) Switzerland
- Education: Cairo University; University of London

Samir Radwan (Arabic: سمير رضوان; 1942 – 18 August 2026) was an Egyptian politician who served in the government of Egypt as Minister of Finance from January 2011 to July 2011. He was an economist with a liberal viewpoint, interested in employment and human development issues.

== Education ==
Radwan received his BSc from Cairo University, moving onto the School of Oriental and African Studies for an MSc in the economics of underdeveloped countries—his thesis was on import substitution industrialization—and the University of London for a PhD on capital formation in Egyptian industry and agriculture from 1882 to 1967, marking the British occupation of Egypt and the Arabs' defeat in the Six Day War with Israel, respectively. The process, as well as facilitating epistemological growth, enabled him to empathize with such figures as Mohammed Ali, ruler of Egypt, and the nationalist industrial entrepreneur Talaat Harb.

== Career ==
Radwan worked at the International Labour Organization (ILO), and the last position he held there was that of adviser to the director general on development policies and counsellor on Arab countries. This served the dual purpose of earning him an international professional standing while keeping him, through one project after another, in more or less direct contact with Egypt: "I never really thought of myself as an expatriate." He also served as a board member of Egypt's General Authority for Investment.

On 31 January 2011, amidst mass protests against President Hosni Mubarak, Radwan was appointed Minister of Finance in the cabinet led by Ahmed Shafik, replacing Youssef Boutros-Ghali in the post.

== Death ==
Radwan died in Switzerland on 18 August 2026, at the age of 84.

Political offices
Preceded by Youssef Boutros Ghali	Minister of Finance; 2011	Succeeded by Hazem Al Beblawi
