= Morsi El Sayed Hegazy =

Minister of Finance
- In office 5 January 2013 – 7 May 2013
- President: Mohamad Morsi
- Prime Minister: Hesham Qandil
- Preceded by: Momtaz Saeed
- Succeeded by: Fayyad Abdel Moneim

Personal details
- Party: Independent
- Education: Alexandria University; Connecticut University

Morsi El Sayed Hegazy is an Egyptian academic and economist who was briefly finance minister, from 6 January to 7 May 2013. He was the fifth finance minister of Egypt since 2011.

== Education ==
Hegazy has a master's degree in economics, which he obtained from Alexandria University in 1976. He received a PhD in economics from Connecticut University in 1985.

== Career ==
Hegazy began his career at Alexandria University in 1986 and was a professor of economics there. His speciality is public finance. He is also interested in Islamic finance.

He was appointed finance minister in a reshuffle to the cabinet of Hisham Qandil on 6 January 2013 to replace Momtaz El Saeed. Hegazy is not a member of any political party. However, he is close to the Muslim Brotherhood group.

Hegazy's term ended on 7 May 2013 and he was replaced in the post by Fayyad Abdel Moneim. Hegazy played a significant role in talks with the IMF to secure a $4.8bn loan when he was in office.

Political offices
Preceded by Momtaz El Saeed	Finance Minister of Egypt; January - May 2013	Succeeded by Fayyad Abdel Moneim
