= Nazih Deif =

Egyptian economist (1923–1992)

Executive Director of International Monetary Fund
- In office 1970–1976

Minister of Treasury
- In office 1964–1968
- President: Gamal Abdel Nasser

Minister of Planning
- In office 1961–1964
- President: Gamal Abdel Nasser

Personal details
- Born: Nazih Ahmed Deif; 4 March 1923
- Died: 10 November 1992 (aged 69) Framingham, Massachusetts, United States of America
- Party: Independent
- Children: 4
- Education: Cairo University; University of Chicago

Nazih Deif (4 March 1923 – 10 November 1992) was an Egyptian economist and academic. He worked at the International Monetary Fund (IMF), other leading finance institutions and Cairo University. He served as the minister of planning and minister of treasury in the 1960s during the presidency of Gamal Abdel Nasser.

== Early life and education ==
Deif was born on 4 March 1923. He received a degree in economics from Cairo University and a master of science degree in statics from the University of Chicago. He was educated particularly in the theories of the American economist Walt Rostow.

== Career ==
In 1953 Deif started his career as an elected member of the Expert Group on Industrialization of the United Arab Republic. In the period between 1957 and 1958 he was the director of economic planning commission of which he served as the director general from 1958 to 1961. He was appointed minister of planning in 1961. His major task was to negotiate with the IMF in relation to economic reforms to be carried out in Egypt. At the time of his appointment Deif was regarded by the American diplomats in Cairo as the most significant economist in the country. Deif remained in office until 1964 when he was named as the governor of the IMF which he held until 1966. During the period between 1964 and 1968 Deif served as the minister of treasury. From 2 October 1965 Deif was part of the cabinet led by Zakaria Mohieddin who was the Prime Minister of the United Arab Republic.

After retiring from government posts Deif began to teach at Cairo University. In 1970 Deif was appointed executive director of the IMF, and his tenure lasted until 1976. From 1979 to 1981 he was the deputy chairman and managing director of National Bank of Kuwait (Egypt).

== Personal life, work and death ==
Deif was married and had four children. He was the author of various articles and books on economy and fiscal policy. He later emigrated to the United States, and died in Framingham, Massachusetts, on 10 November 1992 at the age of 69.
