= Youssef Boutros Ghali =

Egyptian economist and politician

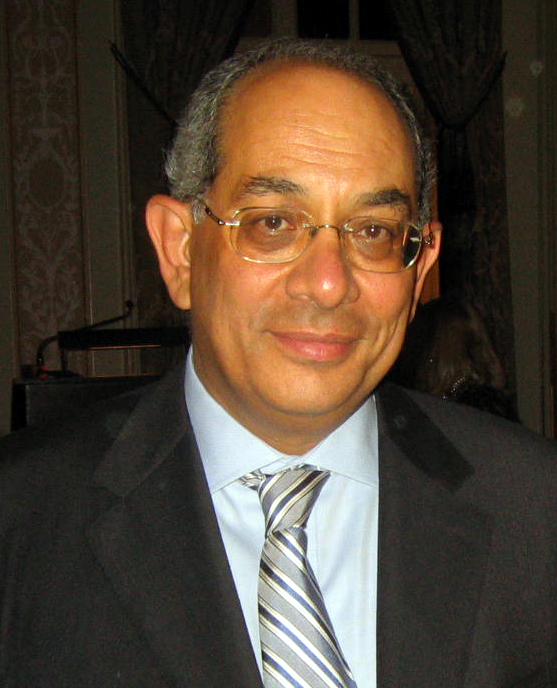

Minister of Finance
- In office 1 July 2004 – 31 January 2011
- President: Hosni Mubarak
- Prime Minister: Ahmed Nazif
- Preceded by: Mohamed Medhat Hassanein
- Succeeded by: Samir Radwan

Personal details
- Born: 20 August 1952 (age 74) Cairo, Egypt
- Relations: Boutros Boutros-Ghali (uncle)
- Children: 3

Youssef Raouf Boutros-Ghali or YBG (Arabic: يوسف رؤوف بطرس غالي; born 20 August 1952) is an Egyptian economist who served in the government of Egypt as Minister of Finance from 2004 to 2011. He was succeeded by Samir Radwan on 31 January 2011.

== Education ==
Youssef Boutros-Ghali earned a Bachelor of Arts degree in economics at Cairo University in 1974. He then earned a Doctor of Philosophy in economics from Massachusetts Institute of Technology in 1981. He was also a lecturer and research assistant during his stay at MIT.

== Career ==
Upon graduation, Boutros-Ghali joined the International Monetary Fund as an EP (Economist Program). He became Senior Economist. He worked in both area and functional departments: first in the Middle East Department (MED) and later in Policy and Development Review (PDR) on Asian, Latin American and Middle Eastern countries. He gained profound knowledge of the economic problems and policy challenges of countries as diverse as the Sudan, Ivory Coast, the Philippines, China, Brazil, the Dominican Republic, and Mexico. He also did background work on the Latin American debt crisis of the early 1980s.

After leaving the Fund in 1986, Boutros-Ghali was appointed Economic Advisor to Egypt's Prime Minister and to the Governor of the Central Bank of Egypt (1986–1993), where he took a prominent role in negotiating the 1987 and 1991 stand-by arrangements with the Fund and the debt rescheduling agreements with the Paris Club. The reform programs initiated then ushered a turnaround in the Egyptian economy and laid the groundwork for economic reforms that are being pursued to this day. Thereafter, Boutros-Ghali was appointed Minister of State for the Council of Ministers and Minister for International Cooperation (1993–1996), where he continued to be active in overseeing program relationship between Egypt and the Fund. He was subsequently named Minister of State for Economic Affairs (1996–1997). Thereafter he assumed the position of Minister of Economy and Foreign Trade (1997–2001), and later Minister of Foreign Trade (2001–2004).

A firm advocate of trade liberalization, as Minister of Foreign Trade, Boutros-Ghali participated in the Seattle, Doha and Cancun ministerial meetings of the World Trade Organization (WTO), and played a prominent role in launching the Doha round. He was also instrumental in concluding the Euro-Mediterranean Partnership Agreement between Egypt and the European Union in 1998. In 1999 he led the negotiations with the COMESA (Common Market for Eastern and Southern Africa) a free trade agreement of some twenty east and southern African countries, into which Egypt was admitted that year. To this day this has provided the basis for an expanded Egyptian presence in the African continent. Early in the following decade and through the joint body created by the US–Egypt Trade and Investment Framework Agreement (TIFA), Boutros-Ghali was active in advancing the negotiations on the free trade agreement between Egypt and United States. He also headed the negotiations leading to the Qualified Industrial Zone (QIZ) agreement between Egypt, the United States, and Israel, established in 2004.

As Minister of Finance, Boutros-Ghali headed the Ministerial Economic Committee in charge of overseeing the design and implementation of Egypt's economic reform programs. He is credited with implementing a series of reforms that helped modernize and reinvigorate the Egyptian economy and deepen its global integration. Chief among these is a major income tax and trade reforms, coupled with deregulation and liberalization in key areas of economic activity. The tax reform program was hailed as one of the most successful reforms among developing countries, which earned Egypt the position of top reformer among developing countries in 2007 by the World Bank.

Boutros-Ghali received the Emerging Markets Award for Finance Minister of the Year for the Middle East Region twice (2005 and 2006).

Boutros-Ghali also received an Honorary Doctorate from Heriot-Watt University in 2008.

On 6 October 2008, Boutros-Ghali was elected chair of the IMF's policy-setting committee the IMFC. He beat India's Finance Minister Palaniappan Chidambaram to chair the 24-member International Monetary and Financial Committee (IMFC) the first chairman from an emerging market economy in the 65-year history of the committee; Boutros-Ghali was well suited to assume the chairmanship of the IMFC. Having served both at the Fund and as a prominent government official, he was well aware of the concerns of the membership and of the reforms needed at the Fund. As IMFC Chairman, during the 2008 financial crisis, Boutros-Ghali helped create a consensus among national financial authorities for a coordinated approach, with active IMF participation, to address the fallout in international financial markets. Throughout Boutros-Ghali worked to promote consensus on the Fund's most pressing reform agenda, particularly on governance reforms to enhance legitimacy and evenhandedness in surveillance, establishing a new and sustainable income model for the Fund, and adapting its instruments to better suit the evolving needs of the membership in a global economy.

In 2010 Boutros-Ghali enacted a far-reaching reform of the social security and pension systems in Egypt. He introduced modern concepts of pension systems notional accounting of accumulated benefits and enacted structural changes to account for the erosion of pension benefits and the burden of pension contributions on the national economy.

Boutros-Ghali resigned from his position as Minister of Finance on 29 January 2011. He declined President Mubarak's offer to join the next government headed by Ahmed Shafik.

== Post-revolution exile ==
On 31 January 2011, as part of Hosni Mubarak's responses to the 2011 Egyptian protests, the government of Prime Minister Ahmed Nazif resigned and Boutros-Ghali, declining to participate in the following government led by Prime Minister designate Ahmed Shafik, was replaced as Minister of Finance by Samir Radwan. Then, on 4 February 2011, the IMF reported that Boutros-Ghali had resigned the Chairmanship of the International Monetary and Financial Committee (IMFC).

On 11 February 2011, just prior to Mubarak's resignation, the VIP lounge at Cairo Airport opened to accommodate Boutros-Ghali and his wife before they flew to Lebanon while other ex-regime officials, including Mubarak himself, were targeted with travel bans, asset freezes, and even arrests. During the chaotic three years that followed Boutros-Ghali along with many other ministers were subjected to legal proceedings. All, including Boutros-Ghali have been rehabilitated under the Sisi administration. With Boutros-Ghali residing abroad, the final steps are taking somewhat longer in winding their way through the legal system. Boutros-Ghali and two of his three sons are now permanent residents of the United Kingdom.

== Writings ==
Boutros-Ghali published texts on exchange rate and monetary policy, external debt problems and debt relief issues, IMF programs, fiscal discipline and exchange rate market reforms.

== Personal life ==
Boutros-Ghali speaks fluent Arabic, English, French, Italian and Spanish. His uncle, Boutros Boutros-Ghali, was Secretary-General of the United Nations from 1992 to 1996. He and his wife have three sons, Nader, Naguib and Youssef. While in London, in October 2011 his wife, Michele, died from a thoracic aneurysm. The death was unexpected and sudden and devastated the family.

Political offices
Preceded by Mohamed Medhat Hassanein	Minister of Finance; July 2004 – January 2011	Succeeded by Samir Radwan
Preceded by	Minister of Foreign Trade; 2001 – July 2004	Succeeded by Rachid Mohamed Rachid as Minister of Trade and Industry
Preceded by	Governor of the Central Bank of Egypt; 1986–1993	Succeeded by
