= Mohie El Din El Ghareeb =

Egyptian economist, politician and businessman (1933–2023)

Mohie El Din Abu Bakr Moussa Mohamed Elgharieb (Arabic: محى الدين الغريب; 1933 – 3 March 2023) was an Egyptian economist, politician, and businessman.

== Personal life ==
El Ghareeb was born in 1933 in Giza, Egypt to a large family.

El Ghareeb had two sons from his first marriage. After his wife died, he married another woman who gave birth to his third son. In 1999 he married his third wife.

== Politics ==
El Ghareeb worked as a World Bank negotiator and an International Monetary Fund governor. He was also a minister in the government of Egypt for 14 years. He was Minister of Finance from 1996 to 1999.

As the lead economist in the National Democratic Party of Egypt he was the deputy after its leader, President Hosni Mubarak of Egypt. He also filled the post of a Senior UN Economic Advisor and the Senior Political and Economic Advisor of many governing bodies including the British Royalty, and for the Governments of Germany, France, Russia, China, Italy, Japan, Saudi Arabia, and the United Arab Emirates.

== Economics ==
El Ghareeb invented the theory of Pay-Over-Debt, and periodically held conferences and/or lectures about his theories in Economics and Political Sciences in many universities and institutes around the world. He wrote many books including the book used as the guide-line for the World Bank and the International Monetary Fund now by the title of The Modern State: Political Economy & Economic Politics. One of his achievements was creating the first (and only) monetary economical system of the UAE and the Persian Gulf region. He also helped lay the new foundation of the Economic system of the Euro and the European Union in co-ordination with the UBS (The World's largest Bank).

== Business ==
El Ghareeb as his family's premier, managed an international group of funds made up of a consortium of Arab families; El Ghareeb (Cairo & Suez, Egypt), Bin Ladin (Jeddah, Saudi Arabia), Al Saud (Riyadh, Saudi Arabia), Al Nahyan (Abu Dhabi, UAE), and Al Maktoum (Dubai, UAE).

Current Group activities include car retailing, heavy duty oil drilling platforms, oil production and export and even Supertanker shipbuilding. Other business ranges of the Group include nuclear power systems, hydrogen power research plants, and advanced materials research and manufacturing labs.

The Group is currently evaluated to be worth more than $2 Trillion (Two Trillion Dollars). The Group trades and/or owns shares in some international corporations, including 15% of DaimlerChrysler, 11% of Siemens Group, 51% of Saudi Aramco (the world's largest oil production company), 12% of Microsoft, 12% of Volkswagen group, a cumulative 25% of EADS (including Airbus), 51% of Saudi Binladin Group, 10% of Citigroup, and 10% of Bayer.

El Ghareeb was also rumoured in Russian media to be one of the world's most dominant arms dealing groups resulting in the suspicion that a lot of the other El Ghareeb's businesses are only for cover.

== Disputes ==
El Ghareeb went through major disputes with the government of Egypt In February 2002, and for 24 months these disputes took place in courts, TV newspapers and involved confinement. At last, the cassation court found him innocent of the charges. After he was declared innocent, the Government of Egypt headed by Atef Ebeed at that time resigned and a new government took office responsibility in what is publicly believed to be the bill paid by the former government for those disputes.

== See also ==
- The World Bank
- International Monetary Fund
- UN Capital Development Fund

== Sources ==
- Money & Banking by Prof. Dr. Mohie El Din El Ghareeb.
- The Modern State: Political Economy & Economic Politics by Prof. Dr. Mohie El Din El Ghareeb.
- External Free Trade by Prof. Dr. Mohie El Din El Ghareeb.
