= Raghib Pasha =

Prime Minister of Egypt (1882)

- إسماعيل راغب باشا
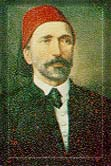

6th Prime Minister of Egypt
- In office 18 June 1882 – 21 August 1882
- Monarch: Tewfik Pasha
- Preceded by: Urabi Pasha
- Succeeded by: Muhammad Sharif Pasha

Personal details
- Born: 1819 Chios, Greece
- Died: 1884 (aged 64–65) Egypt
- Children: Idris Ragheb Bey (son)

Isma'il ibn Ahmad ibn Hassan bani Yani (Arabic: إسماعيل بن أحمد بن حسن بني يني), known simply as Isma'il Ragheb Pasha (Arabic: إسماعيل راغب باشا) (1819–1884), was an Ottoman politician who served as Prime Minister of Egypt and held several other high-ranking government positions.

Isma'il Ragheb was of Greek ancestry and was born in Greece on 18 August 1819 on either the island of Chios following the great massacre of Candia, Crete. After being kidnapped to Anatolia he was brought to Egypt as a slave by Ibrahim Pasha in 1830 and was converted to Islam. Immediately following his arrival, he studied at al-Maktab al-Amiri and obtained his advanced degree in 1834. He was fluent in Greek and was elevated to the rank of First Lieutenant by Egypt's viceroy Muhammad Ali Pasha. In 1836, he became head of the Accounting and Revenue Agencies. He was promoted to the rank of bikbashi (Lieutenant Colonel) in 1840, then kaymakam (Colonel) in 1844, and finally amiralay (Brigadier General) in 1846.

He held the positions of Minister of Finance (1858–1860), then Minister of War (1860–1861). He became Inspector for the Maritime Provinces in 1862, and later Assistant (Arabic: باشمعاون) to viceroy Isma'il Pasha (1863–1865). He was granted the title of beylerbey and then appointed President of the Privy council in 1868. He was appointed President of the Chamber of Deputies (1866–1867), then Minister of Interior in 1867, then Minister of Agriculture and Trade in 1875. He again held the Finance portfolio in Muhammad Sharif Pasha's first government (1879). After the fall of Mahmoud Sami el-Baroudi's government, Isma'il Ragheb became Prime Minister of Egypt in 1882. Although his government was short-lived (it lasted from 17 June to 21 August only), it was the only one to present concrete programs. His achievements include the modernisation of the budget through the inventory of revenues and expenses, the Law on Salaries, and the La'eha Sa'ideyya as well as several agricultural laws.

Isma'il Ragheb died in 1884.

Political offices
Preceded by Mahmoud Sami el-Baroudi	Prime Minister of Egypt; 17 June 1882 – 21 August 1882	Succeeded by Muhammad Sharif Pasha
