= Said Pasha Zulfikar =

Said Pasha Zulfikar, KCMG, KBE, also known as Zulfikar Pasha or Zulfiqar Pasha, was Chamberlain to the Khedive of Egypt by 1888 and Grand Chamberlain by 1919 and at least until 1938. He also served as Grand Master of Ceremonies in 1910.

He was appointed Honorary Companion of the Order of St Michael and St George (CMG) in June 1887, Honorary Knight Commander of the Order of St Michael and St George (KCMG) in June 1888, and Honorary Knight Commander of the Order of the British Empire (KBE) in the 1920 New Year Honours.
