= Abdul Munim Qaysuni =

Egyptian economist (1916–1987)

Personal details
- Born: 9 June 1916 Heliopolis, Cairo, Sultanate of Egypt
- Died: 1987 (aged 70–71)
- Party: Arab Socialist Union
- Education: Cairo University; London School of Economics

Abdul Munim Qaysuni (Arabic: عبد المنعم القيسوني, romanized: Abd al-Munim Qaysuni; 1916–1987) was an Egyptian economist and politician who held several cabinet posts during the presidency of Gamal Abdel Nasser and Anwar Sadat.

== Early life and education ==
Qaysuni was born in Heliopolis, Cairo, on 9 June 1916. His father was Major General Mahmoud Qaysuni Pasha. He graduated from Cairo University in 1938 obtaining a degree in commerce. He received a Ph.D. from the London School of Economics. During his studies in England he worked at Barclays Bank.

== Career ==
Qaysuni was the director of trade at the Ministry of Economy in 1950. He left the job and began to teach at the faculty of commerce for a short time. He joined the National Bank as the director of the Cash Department and was the technical representative of the International Monetary Fund at the National Bank of Egypt between 1950 and 1954. During this period he developed good relations with the bankers in Western countries.

Qaysuni was made deputy minister of finance under Abdul Hamid Al Sharif in April 1954. He was appointed minister of finance in January 1955 and remained in office until March 1958. He was the minister of economy and trade from March 1958 to October 1958. Then he served as the minister of central economy between October 1958 and October 1962. He was appointed minister of treasury and planning in September 1962 which he held until March 1964. He joined the Arab Socialist Union in 1962 when the party was established and was one of the sub-secretaries for its finance and commerce department. The other sub-secretary of the department was Hassan Ibrahim, a Free Officers Movement member.

Qaysuni was the deputy prime minister for economic and financial affairs from March 1964 to October 1965. He was also named as the minister of economy and foreign trade in March 1964 which he held until 18 August 1964 when Muhammad Labib Shuqayr was appointed to the post. Qaysuni retained his post as deputy prime minister for economic and financial affairs between October 1965 and September 1966. He was named as the minister of planning in June 1967 which he held until March 1968. The reason for his leave of office was the strained relations between him and Zakaria Mohieddin.

Qaysuni was appointed deputy prime minister for economic and financial affairs in November 1976. He also held the post of the minister of planning from October 1977. The cabinet was led by Prime Minister Mamdouh Salem. He resigned from both offices in May 1978.

Throughout his political career Qaysuni was a supporter of foreign investment and private enterprise to improve Egypt's economy. He was also an advocate of cutting subsidies arguing that subsidies did not help the poor in the country.

== Personal life and death ==
Qaysuni was married and had children. He died in 1987.
