= Medhat Hassanein =

Egyptian politician

Muhammad Medhat Hassanein (born 1939) was Minister of Finance of Egypt from 1999 to 2004. He is currently professor of finance and banking in the department of management of the school of business at The American University in Cairo.
