= Hassan Sabry Pasha =

Prime Minister of Egypt (1940)

- حسن صبري باشا
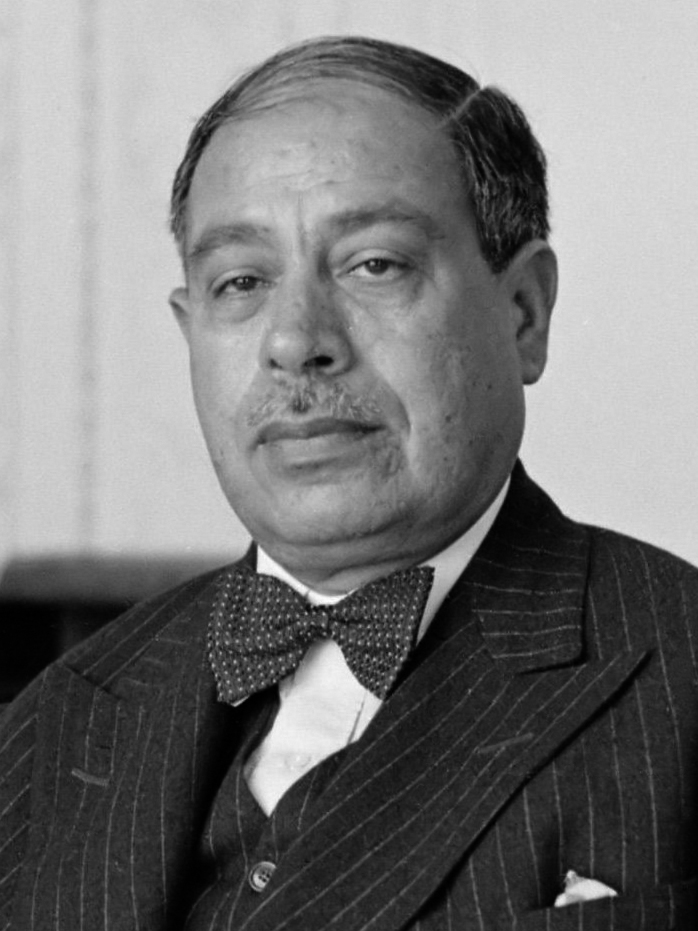
- Sabry in 1935

24th Prime Minister of Egypt
- In office 28 June 1940 – 14 November 1940
- Monarch: Farouk I
- Preceded by: Ali Mahir Pasha
- Succeeded by: Hussein Sirry Pasha.

Personal details
- Born: 1890
- Died: 14 November 1940 (aged 49–50) Cairo, Egypt

Hassan Sabry Pasha (1890–14 November 1940) was an Egyptian politician who briefly served as prime minister of Egypt in 1940.

== Career ==
Following his graduation with a teaching degree and a law degree, Hassan Pasha started his career as headmaster of the Muhammad 'Ali School in Cairo. Then he taught at Al Azhar University. In 1926, he became a member of the Chamber of Deputies, representing Gharbiyya. In 1931, he was elected to the Senate. From 1933 to 1934 he served as finance minister. In 1934, he was appointed Egypt's ambassador to the United Kingdom. Following his return to Egypt he was made commerce and communications minister and then war or defense minister.

He was appointed by King Farouk to form a coalition cabinet in June 1940. He succeeded Ali Mahir Pasha as prime minister and served as the Prime Minister of Egypt from 28 June 1940 to 14 November 1940. He died on the floor of Parliament as he gave a speech accepting the Grand Cordon of Mohammed Ali, the highest honor of the Kingdom of Egypt.

He was succeeded by Hussein Sirri Pasha.

Political offices
| Preceded by Ali Mahir Pasha | Prime Minister of Egypt; 1940 | Succeeded by Hussein Sirri Pasha |
