= Mohamed Maait =

Egyptian politician and minister of finance

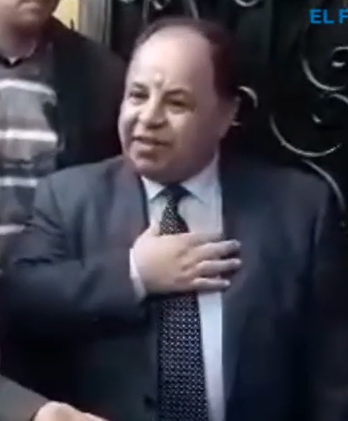
Mohamed Maait 2019

Mohamed Maait is a former Egyptian politician who was minister of finance following his promotion from vice minister of finance for public treasury affairs and head of the Economic Justice Unit. He was named African Finance Minister of the Year in 2019.

== Education ==
Maait received his bachelor's degree in insurance and mathematics in 1984 and an MPhil in insurance in 1992 from Cairo University, Egypt. He then went to City University, London, where he earned a Diploma in Actuarial Science in 1996, a master's degree in 1997 and a PhD in 2003.

== Career ==
He was executive director of the Egyptian Insurance Institute in 2007 before being appointed senior advisor to the minister of finance in 2009. From 2013 to 2015, he was concurrently vice chairman of the Egyptian Financial Supervisory Authority, assistant minister of finance for actuarial administration affairs in 2013 and first assistant minister of health and population from 2014 to 2015. He was deployed as first assistant minister of finance for treasury affairs before being elevated to the position of vice minister of finance for public treasury affairs and head of the Economic Justice Unit and was later named as minister of finance.

He has been chairman of the board of directors of the Egyptian General Authority for Universal Health Insurance since 2018 and chairman of the board of directors of Africa Reinsurance Corporation since 2021.

== Award ==
He was named African Finance Minister of the Year in 2019 for "Egypt’s ambitious programme of economic reform" that has won "plaudits from around the world, with good reason", according to the organisers.
