= Ministry of Finance (Egypt) =

Government ministry of Egypt

Arab Republic of Egypt Ministry of Finance
- وزارة الماليـــة
- Emblem of Egypt

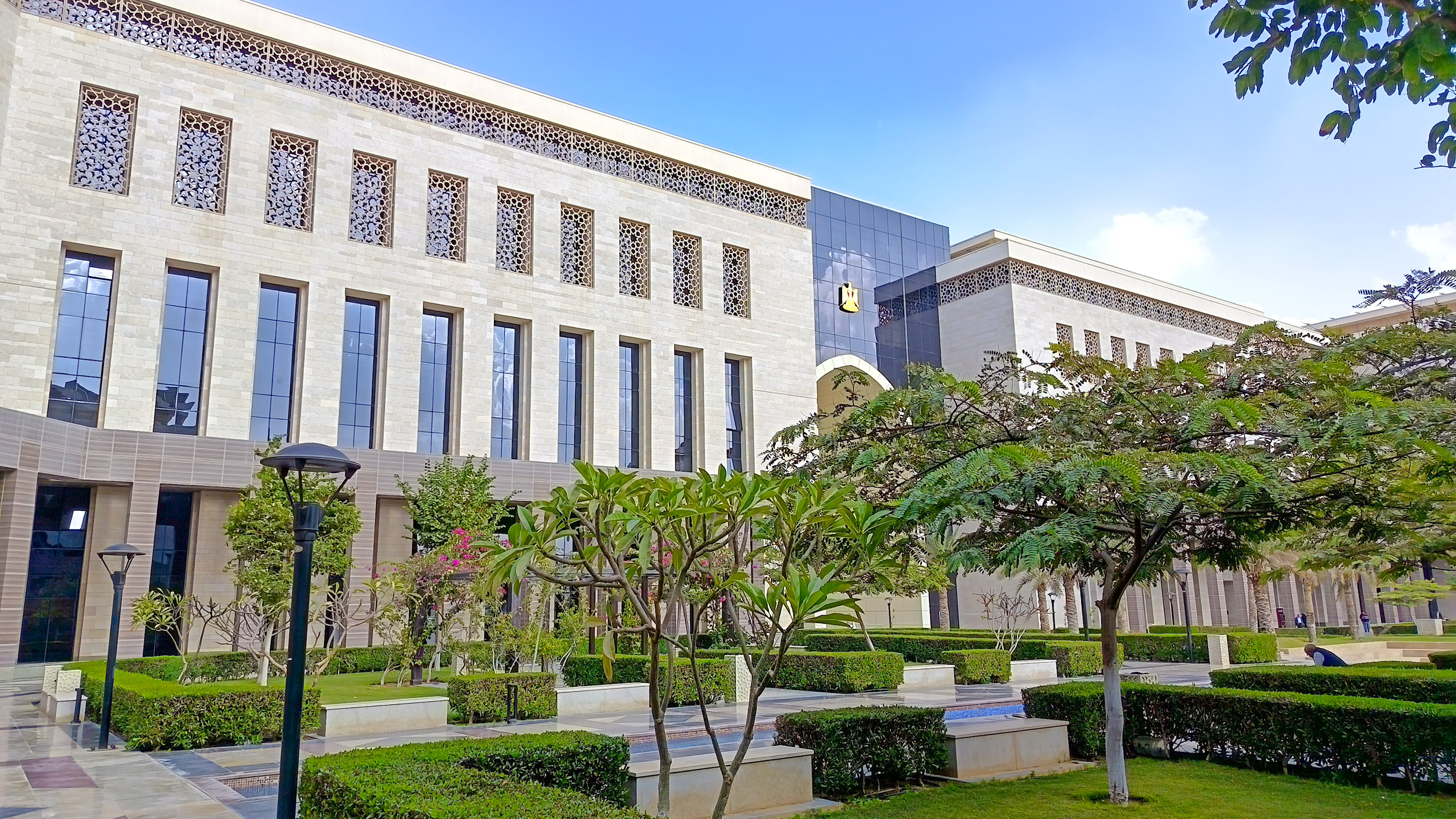
- The Ministry building in The New Capital

Agency overview
- Jurisdiction: Government of Egypt
- Headquarters: The New Capital
- Agency executive: Ahmed Kouchouk, Minister
- Website: Official website

The Ministry of Finance of Egypt is part of the Cabinet of Egypt. It is responsible for increasing the rate of economic growth and job creation, thus contributing to raising the standard of living of the individual and society as a whole. The minister was Mohamed Maait. It is located in the Government District of The New Capital.

== Objectives ==
The goal of the Ministry of Finance is to design and develop policies and financial plans of the state, coordinate budgets, streamline the government's expenditure and develop tax revenues in order to achieve economic and social objectives.

== Disciplines ==
=== Political role ===
- The proposal of fiscal policy is to achieve the objectives of economic and social development plan.
- Develop plans and programs related to the financial aspects to ensure the achievement of national goals.
- Preparation of draft general budget of the state and progress them to the concerned authorities.

=== Oversight role ===
- Overseeing the implementation of the state budget after its ratification, and assessing the results to ensure the achievement of the general plan of the State.
- Practice of surveillance, monitoring and technical supervision of financial and accounting systems.
- Planning and follow-up purchases and sales of the administrative machinery of the state and its public bodies.

=== Legislative role ===
- Studying of financial legislation and expressing an opinion on legislation prepared by other ministries which involve new financial burdens of the Treasury.
- Conduct studies and research on fiscal policy in the light of financial and economic developments both internal and external.
- Participate in the review of all international conventions relating to grants and loans.
- Conduct necessary legislative studies in conjunction with the concerned authorities to link the general plan of the State and financing plans for local and foreign currency.

=== Executive role ===
- Measurement of financial resources and pooling of surplus income and general reserves.
- Assessing, following-up and collection of public resources and all that is entrusted to the ministry.
- Practice of the public treasury and control the conduct of securities and cash (five and ten piastres) and coining of different coins.
- Overseeing the National Investment Bank.
- Management and liquidation of the funds awarded to the State under the laws of nationalization and custody or under the provisions of the Court of values.

== See also ==
- Cabinet of Egypt
- List of ministers of finance of Egypt
