= Anti-Disengagement =

Anti-Disengagement may refer to:

- Engagement (disambiguation), through a double negative prefix
- Disengagement (disambiguation), opposition
  - Israeli disengagement from Gaza, opposition

== See also ==
- Engagement
