= History of republican Egypt =

The History of Republican Egypt spans the period of modern Egyptian history from the Egyptian Revolution of 1952 to the present day, which saw the toppling of the monarchy of Egypt and Sudan, the establishment of a presidential republic, and a period of profound economic, and political change in Egypt, and throughout the Arab world. The abolition of a monarchy and aristocracy viewed widely as sympathetic to Western interests, particularly since the ousting of Khedive Isma'il Pasha, over seven decades earlier, helped strengthen the authentically Egyptian character of the republic in the eyes of its supporters.

Following the formal abolition of the monarchy in 1953, Egypt was known officially as the Republic of Egypt until 1958, the United Arab Republic from 1958 to 1971 (including a period of union with Syria from 1958 to 1961), and has been known as the Arab Republic of Egypt since 1971.

Egypt's first four presidents were all drawn from professional military backgrounds, due in large part to the central role of the armed forces of Egypt in the Revolution of 1952, and oversaw authoritarian governments, with varying limits on political participation and freedom of speech. Under Gamal Abdel Nasser, the republic had an Arab socialist government, which changed to a more free market-oriented economy and less-pan-Arab orientation with his successors Anwar Sadat and Hosni Mubarak. In 2011 a revolution calling for more freedom overthrew Mubarak.

== Nasser era ==
=== Revolution of 1952 ===
On 22–26 July 1952, the Free Officers, a group of disaffected officers in the Egyptian army founded by Gamal Abdel Nasser, and headed by General Muhammad Naguib, initiated the Egyptian Revolution of 1952 with the overthrowing King Farouk, whom the military blamed for Egypt's poor performance in the 1948 War with Israel and lack of progress in fighting poverty, disease, and illiteracy in Egypt. In the following two years, the Free Officers consolidated power, and, following a brief experiment with civilian rule, abrogated the 1953 constitution, and declared Egypt a republic on 18 June 1953, Muhammad Naguib as Egypt's first President.

Within six months, all civilian political parties were banned, getting replaced by the "Liberation Rally" government party, the elites seeing a need for a "transitional authoritarianism" in light of Egypt's poverty, illiteracy and lack of a large middle class. In October and November 1954 the large Islamist Muslim Brotherhood organization was suppressed and President Naguib was ousted and arrested. He was replaced by Nasser. Nasser remained president until his death in 1970.

The revolutionaries wanted an end to British occupation but did not have a unified ideology or plan for Egypt. One issue that many agreed on was the need for land reform. Less than six percent of Egypt's population owned more than 65% of the land in Egypt, while at the top and less than 0.5% of Egyptians owned more than one-third of all fertile land. the process of land reform began on 11 September 1952, when (among many provisions) a law prohibited ownership of more than 200 feddans of land; limited the rental rate for land; established cooperatives for farmers; minimum wages, etc.

Nasser evolved into a charismatic leader, not only of Egypt but of the Arab world, promoting and implementing "Arab socialism".

=== Suez Crisis and War ===
When the United States held up military sales in reaction to Egyptian neutrality regarding the Soviet Union, Nasser concluded an arms deal with Czechoslovakia in September 1955. When the US and the World Bank withdrew their offer to help finance the Aswan High Dam in mid-1956, Nasser nationalized the privately owned Suez Canal Company. The crisis that followed, exacerbated by growing tensions with Israel over guerrilla attacks from Gaza and Israeli reprisals, support for the National Liberation Front's war of liberation against the French in Algeria and against Britain's presence in the Arab world, resulted in the invasion of Egypt in October by France, Britain, and Israel.

In 1958 Egypt joined with the Republic of Syria to form a state called the United Arab Republic. It existed until Syria's secession in 1961, although Egypt continued to be known as the UAR until 1971.

Nasser helped establish with India and Yugoslavia the Non-Aligned Movement of developing countries in September 1961, and continued to be a leading force in the movement until his death.

Nasser ruled as an autocrat but remained extremely popular within Egypt and throughout the Arab world due to his socialist policies at home and anti-imperialist internationalism in the region. His willingness to stand up to the Western powers and to Israel won him support throughout the region. It was partially to smash Nasser's independence that the United States armed Israel to the teeth in preparation for the Six Day War in 1967.

=== Six-Day War ===
In May 1967, Nasser closed the Straits of Tiran to passage of Israeli ships. On 26 May Nasser declared, "The battle will be a general one and our basic objective will be to destroy Israel". Israel considered the Straits of Tiran closure a casus belli. In the 1967 Six Day War, Israel attacked Egypt after claiming that Egyptian forces mobilized on Israel's border with Egypt. The Egyptian, Syrian and Jordanian armed forces were routed by the Israelis, after Nasser convinced the Syrians and Jordanians to attack Israel. Israel occupied the Sinai Peninsula and the Gaza Strip from Egypt, Golan Heights from Syria, and the West Bank from Jordan.

This defeat was a severe blow to Nasser's prestige at home and abroad. Following the defeat, Nasser made a dramatic offer to resign, which was only retracted in the face of mass demonstrations urging him to stay. The last three years of his control over Egypt were far more subdued.

=== Education ===
Educational opportunities were "dramatically expanded" after the revolution. The Free Officers pledged to provide free education for all citizens and abolished all fees for public schools. They doubled the Ministry of Education's budget in one decade; government spending on education grew from less than 3 percent of the gross domestic product (GDP) in 1952–53 to more than 5 percent by 1978. Expenditures on school construction increased 1,000 percent between 1952 and 1976, and the total number of primary schools doubled to 10,000. By the mid-1970s, the educational budget represented more than 25 percent of the government's total current budget expenses.

== Sadat era ==
After Nasser's death, another of the "free officers", then Vice President Anwar el-Sadat, acceded to the office of the Presidency. He was not elected democratically.

In 1971, Sadat concluded a treaty of friendship with the Soviet Union, but a year later he ordered Soviet advisers to leave. Nevertheless, up to 4,000 military Soviet advisers were being shared with Syria, and Soviet engineers continued to maintain Egyptian military radar and equipment during the October War.

=== 1973 War ===
In 1973, Sadat launched the 6 October 1973 war with Israel. Egypt's armed forces achieved initial successes in the Crossing of the Suez Canal and advanced 15 km, reaching the depth of the range of safe coverage of its own air force.

Having defeated the Israeli forces to this extent, Egyptian forces, rather than advancing under air cover, decided to immediately penetrate further into the Sinai desert. In spite of huge losses they kept advancing, creating the chance to open a gap between army forces. That gap was exploited by a tank division led by Ariel Sharon, and he and his tanks managed to penetrate onto Egyptian soil, reaching Suez City.

Israel was stunned by the attack but recuperated by infusion of weaponry from the U.S. Arab oil producers announced a boycott of Western backers of Israel: a 5% cut in output, to be followed by reductions every month until Israel had withdrawn from all the occupied territories and the rights of the Palestinians had been restored. A UN resolution supported by the United States and the Soviet Union called for an end to hostilities and for peace talks to begin. For President Anwar Sadat, however, the war was much more a victory than a draw, as the Egyptian successes restored Egyptian pride and led to peace talks with the Israelis and to Egypt regaining the entire Sinai peninsula.

=== International relations and the Camp David Accords ===
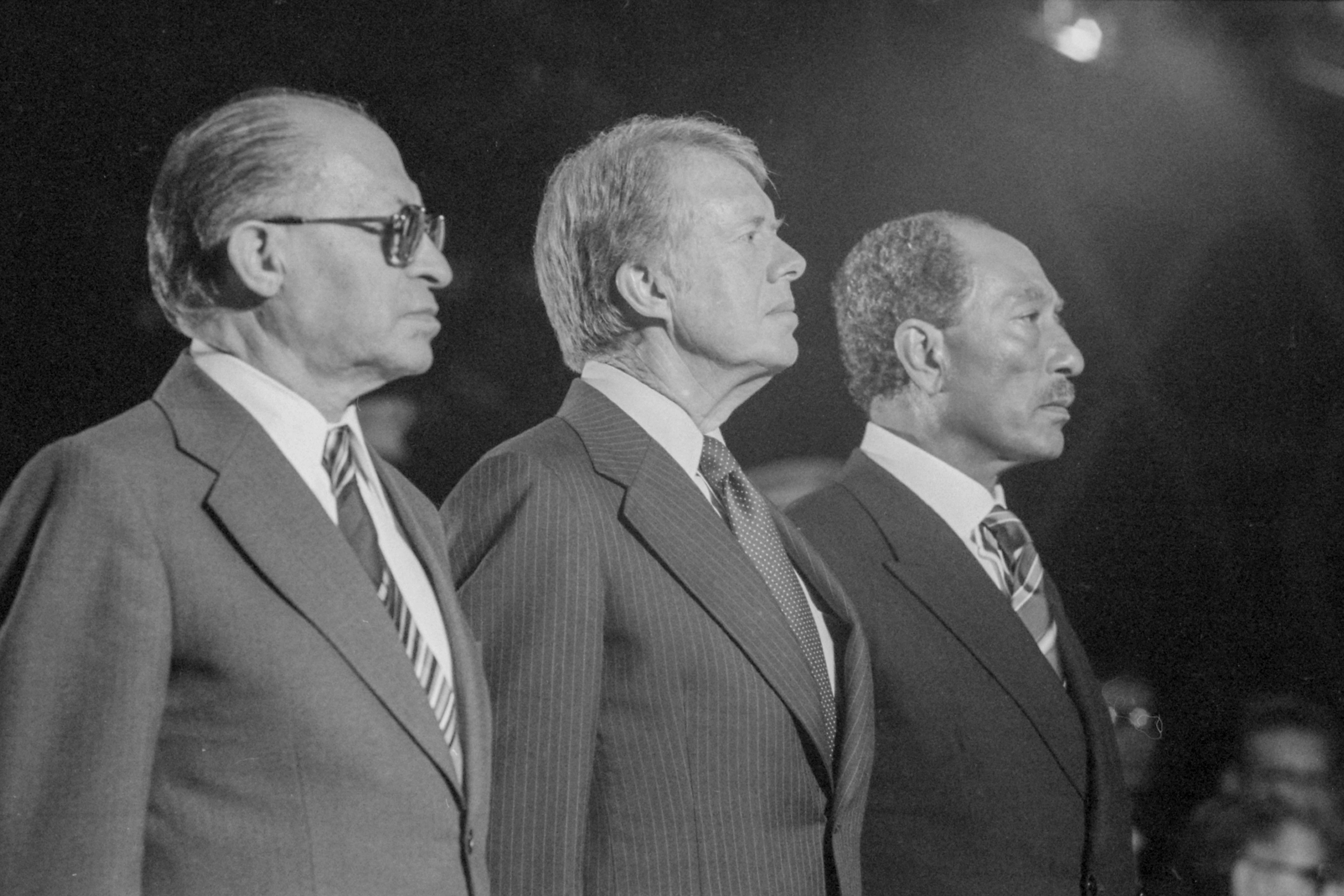
Celebrating the signing of the Camp David Accords: Menachem Begin, Jimmy Carter, Anwar Al Sadat.

In foreign relations Sadat also launched momentous change from the Nasser era. President Sadat shifted Egypt from a policy of confrontation with Israel to one of peaceful accommodation through negotiations. Following the Sinai Disengagement Agreements of 1974 and 1975, Sadat created a fresh opening for progress by his dramatic visit to Jerusalem in November 1977. This led to the invitation from President Jimmy Carter of the United States to President Sadat and Israeli Prime Minister Menachem Begin to enter trilateral negotiations at Camp David.

The outcome was the historic Camp David accords, signed by Egypt and Israel and witnessed by the US on 17 September 1978. The accords led to 26 March 1979, signing of the Egypt–Israel peace treaty, by which Egypt regained control of the Sinai in May 1982. Throughout this period, US–Egyptian relations steadily improved, and Egypt became one of America's largest recipients of foreign aid. Sadat's willingness to break ranks by making peace with Israel earned him the enmity of most other Arab states, however. In 1977, Egypt fought a short border war with Libya.

=== Domestic policy and the Infitah ===
Sadat used his immense popularity with the Egyptian people to try to push through vast economic reforms that ended the socialist controls of Nasserism. Sadat introduced greater political freedom and a new economic policy, the most important aspect of which was the infitah or "open door" that relaxed government controls over the economy and encouraged private investment. While the reforms created a wealthy and successful upper class and a small middle class, these reforms had little effect upon the average Egyptian who began to grow dissatisfied with Sadat's rule. In 1977, Infitah policies led to massive spontaneous riots ('Bread Riots') involving hundreds of thousands of Egyptians when the state announced that it was retiring subsidies on basic foodstuffs.

Liberalization also included the reinstitution of due process and the legal banning of torture. Sadat dismantled much of the existing political machine and brought to trial a number of former government officials accused of criminal excesses during the Nasser era. Sadat tried to expand participation in the political process in the mid-1970s but later abandoned this effort. In the last years of his life, Egypt was wracked by violence arising from discontent with Sadat's rule and sectarian tensions, and it experienced a renewed measure of repression including extra judicial arrests.

== Mubarak era ==
On 6 October 1981, President Sadat was assassinated by Islamic extremists. Hosni Mubarak, Vice President since 1975 and air force commander during the October 1973 war, was elected president later that month. He was subsequently "re-elected" by referendum for three more 6-year terms, most recently in September 2005, all but the 2005 vote lacking any competing candidate.

Mubarak maintained Egypt's commitment to the Camp David peace process, but was able to coax Arab countries into resuming diplomatic relations with Egypt and re-establishing Egypt's position as an Arab leader. Egypt was readmitted to the Arab League in 1989. Egypt also has played a moderating role in such international forums as the UN and the Nonaligned Movement.

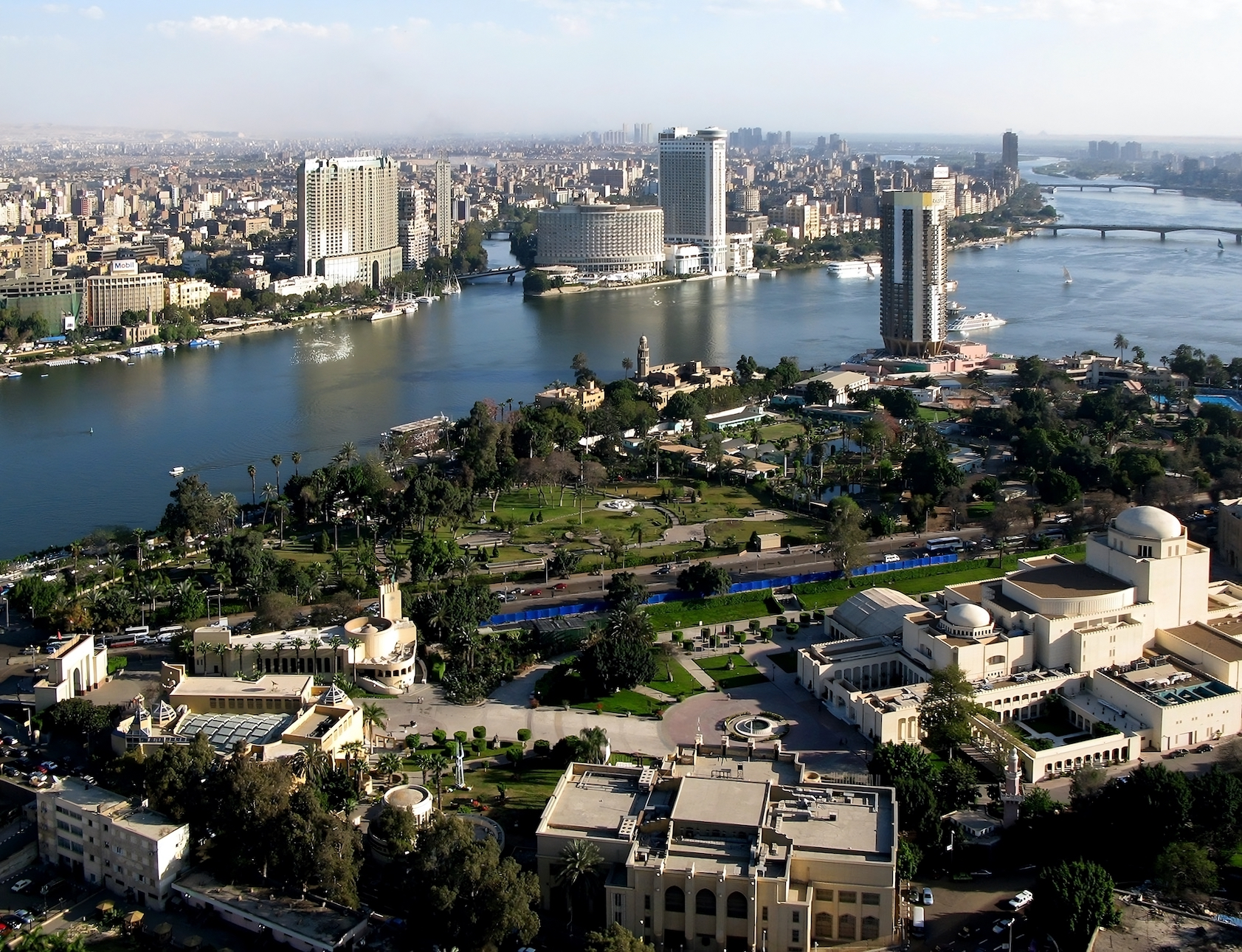
A section of present-day Cairo, as seen from the Cairo Tower.

From 1991, Mubarak undertook an ambitious domestic economic reform program to reduce the size of the public sector and expand the role of the private sector.

During the 1990s, a series of International Monetary Fund arrangements, coupled with massive external debt relief resulting from Egypt's participation in the Gulf War coalition, helped Egypt improve its macroeconomic performance. During the 1990s and 2000s, inflation was lowered from double-digit to single digit rate. Gross domestic product (GDP) per capita based on purchasing-power-parity (PPP) increased fourfold between 1981 and 2006, from US$1355 in 1981, to $2525 in 1991, to $3686 in 2001 and to an estimated $4535 in 2006. Despite this, most Egyptians suffered a drop in their standard of living.

There was much less progress in political reform. The November 2000 People's Assembly elections saw 34 members of the opposition win seats in the 454-seat assembly, facing a clear majority of 388 affiliated with the ruling National Democratic Party (NDP). A constitutional amendment in May 2005 changed the presidential election to a multicandidate popular vote rather than a popular validation of a candidate nominated by the People's Assembly and on 7 September Mubarak was elected for another six-year term with 87 percent of the popular vote, followed by a distant but strong showing by Ayman Nour, leader of the opposition Ghad Party and a well-known rights activist. Shortly after mounting an unprecedented presidential campaign, Nour was jailed on forgery charges critics called phony; he was released on 18 February 2009. Brotherhood members were allowed to run for parliament in 2005 as independents, garnering 88 seats, or 20 percent of the People's Assembly.

The opposition parties have been weak and divided and are not yet credible alternatives to the NDP. The Muslim Brotherhood, founded in Egypt in 1928, remains an illegal organization and may not be recognized as a political party (current Egyptian law prohibits the formation of political parties based on religion). Members are known publicly and openly speak their views. Members of the Brotherhood have been elected to the People's Assembly and local councils as independents. The Egyptian political opposition also includes groups and popular movements such as Kefaya and the April 6 Youth Movement, although they are somewhat less organized than officially registered political parties. Bloggers, or cyberactivists as Courtney C. Radsch termed them, have also played an important political opposition role, writing, organizing, and mobilizing public opposition.

President Mubarak had tight, autocratic control over Egypt. A dramatic drop in support for Mubarak, or a dramatic increase in people dissatisfied with his practices and his domestic economic reform program increased with surfacing news about his son Alaa being extremely corrupt and favored in government tenders and privatization. As Alaa started getting out of the picture by 2000, Mubarak's second son Gamal started rising in the National Democratic Party and succeeded in getting a newer generation of neo-liberals into the party and eventually the government. Gamal Mubarak branched out with a few colleagues to set up Medinvest Associates Ltd., which manages a private equity fund, and to do some corporate finance consultancy work.

== Civil unrest 2011-2014 ==
=== 2011 revolution ===
Beginning on 25 January 2011, a series of street demonstrations, protests, and civil disobedience acts took place in Egypt, with organizers counting on the Tunisian uprising to inspire the crowds to mobilize. The demonstrations and riots were reported to have started over police brutality, state of emergency laws, unemployment, desire to raise the minimum wage, lack of housing, food inflation, corruption, lack of freedom of speech, and poor living conditions. The protests' main goal at the beginning was mainly to protest against the above-mentioned problems, but due to the reactions of the system which was considered late, inadequate and inconvenient the demonstrations started to develop and evolve so that the goal was to oust President Mubarak's regime. Most observers and analysts noticed a unique feature about the revolution that it did not have any leader and it is a clear example of "The wisdom of the crowd". On 11 February 2011, President Mubarak resigned, relinquishing power to an interim military authority. The democratically elected president, Mohammed Morsi, followed Mubarak's resignation.

=== First transition ===
The military provisional government, under Mohamed Hussein Tantawi, initiated reforms. Constitutional referendum was held; a provisional constitution came to force. Parliamentary free elections were held. A constituent assembly, founded on 26 March 2012, started to work for implementing a new constitution. The first free presidential elections were held in March–June 2012, with a runoff between former Prime Minister Ahmed Shafik and Muslim Brotherhood parliamentarian Mohamed Morsi. On 24 June 2012, Egypt's election commission announced that Morsi had won the run-off. On 30 June 2012, Mohamed Morsi was sworn in as Egypt’s new president.

=== Morsi's presidency ===
On 8 July 2012, Egypt's new president Mohamed Morsi announced he was overriding the military edict that dissolved the country's elected parliament and he called lawmakers back into session.

On 10 July 2012, the Supreme Constitutional Court of Egypt negated the decision by President Mohamed Morsi to call the nation's parliament back into session. On 2 August 2012, Egypt's Prime Minister Hisham Qandil announced his 35-member cabinet comprising 28 newcomers including four from the influential Muslim Brotherhood, six others and the former military ruler Mohamed Hussein Tantawi as the Defence Minister from the previous Government.

On 22 November 2012, President Morsi issued a declaration immunizing his decrees from challenge and seeking to protect the work of the constituent assembly drafting the new constitution. The declaration also requires a retrial of those accused in the Mubarak-era killings of protesters, who had been acquitted, and extends the mandate of the constituent assembly by two months. Additionally, the declaration authorizes Morsi to take any measures necessary to protect the revolution. Liberal and secular groups previously walked out of the constitutional constituent assembly because they believed that it would impose strict Islamic practices, while Muslim Brotherhood backers threw their support behind Morsi.

The move was criticized by Mohamed ElBaradei, the leader of Egypt's Constitution Party, who stated "Morsi today usurped all state powers & appointed himself Egypt's new pharaoh" on his Twitter feed. The move led to massive protests and violent action throughout Egypt. On 5 December 2012, Tens of thousands of supporters and opponents of Egypt's president clashed, hurling rocks and Molotov cocktails and brawling in Cairo's streets, in what was described as the largest violent battle between Islamists and their foes since the country's revolution. Six senior advisors and three other officials resigned from the government and the country's leading Islamic institution called on Morsi to stem his powers. Protesters also clamored from coastal cities to desert towns.

Morsi offered a "national dialogue" with opposition leaders but refused to cancel a 15 December vote on a draft constitution written by an Islamist-dominated assembly that has ignited two weeks of political unrest.

A constitutional referendum was held in two rounds on 15 and 22 December 2012, with 64% support, and 33% against. It was signed into law by a presidential decree issued by Morsi on 26 December 2012.

On 30 June 2013, on the first anniversary of the election of Morsi, millions of protesters across Egypt took to the streets and demanded the immediate resignation of the president. On 1 July, the Egyptian Armed Forces issued a 48-hour ultimatum that gave the country's political parties until 3 July to meet the demands of the Egyptian people. The presidency rejected the Egyptian Army's 48-hour ultimatum, vowing that the president would pursue his own plans for national reconciliation to resolve the political crisis. On 3 July, General Abdul Fatah al-Sisi, head of the Egyptian Armed Forces, announced that he had removed President Morsi from power, suspended the constitution and would be calling new presidential and Shura Council elections and appointed Supreme Constitutional Court's leader, Adly Mansour as acting president. Mansour was sworn in on 4 July 2013.

=== Second transition ===
During the months after the coup d'état, a new constitution was prepared, which took effect on 18 January 2014. After that, presidential and parliamentary elections have to be held within 6 months.

On 24 March 2014, 529 of Morsi's supporters were sentenced to death. On 28 April, the verdict against all except 37 of them was changed to life sentence, but another nearly 700 Islamists including the Muslim Brotherhood leader Mohammed Badie were sentenced to death. As of 28 April, the trial of Morsi is still ongoing.

El-Sisi confirmed on 26 March 2014 that he would run for president in the presidential election. The presidential election, which took place between 26 and 28 May 2014, saw el-Sisi win 96 percent of votes counted.

== Sisi's presidency ==
In the elections of June 2014 El-Sisi won with a percentage of 96.1%. On 8 June 2014, Abdel Fatah el-Sisi was officially sworn in as Egypt's new president. Under President el-Sisi, Egypt has implemented a rigorous policy of controlling the border to the Gaza Strip, including the dismantling of tunnels between the Gaza strip and Sinai.

In April 2018, El-Sisi was re-elected by landslide in election with no real opposition. In April 2019, Egypt’s parliament extended presidential terms from four to six years. President Abdel Fattah al-Sisi was also allowed to run for third term in next election in 2024.

Under El-Sisi Egypt is said to have returned to authoritarianism. New constitutional reforms have been implemented, meaning strengthening the role of military and limiting the political opposition. The constitutional changes were accepted in a referendum in April 2019.

In December 2020, final results of the parliamentary election confirmed a clear majority of the seats for Egypt’s Mostaqbal Watn (Nation’s Future) Party, which strongly supports president El-Sisi. The party even increased its majority, partly because of new electoral rules.

== See also ==
- History of modern Egypt
- Egyptian Constitution of 1923
- Liberalism in Egypt
- Terrorism in Egypt
