= History of Egypt under Anwar Sadat =

Aspect of Egyptian history

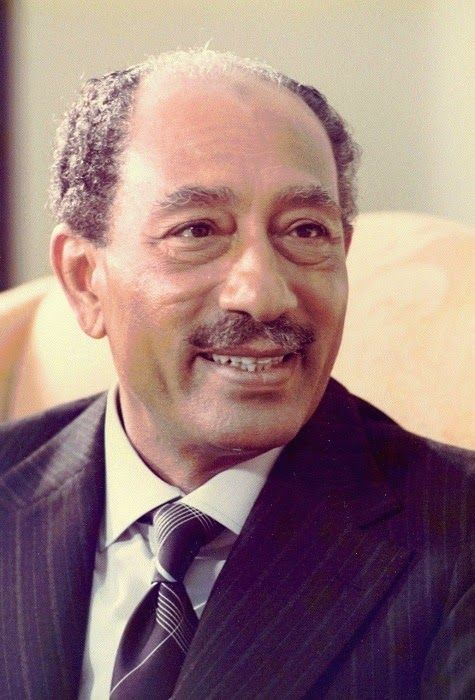
President Sadat in 1978

The history of Egypt under Anwar Sadat covers the eleven-year period of Egyptian history from Anwar Sadat's election as President of Egypt on 15 October 1970, following the death of President Gamal Abdel Nasser, to Sadat's assassination by Islamist fundamentalist army officers on 6 October 1981.

Though presenting himself as a Nasserist during his predecessor's lifetime, upon becoming president, Sadat broke with many of the core tenets of the domestic and foreign policy ideology that had defined Egyptian politics since the Egyptian Revolution of 1952. In addition to abandoning many of Nasser's economic and political principles via the Infitah policy, Sadat ended Egypt's strategic partnership with the Soviet Union in favor of a new strategic relationship with the United States, initiated the peace process with the State of Israel in exchange for the evacuation of all Israeli military forces and settlers from Egyptian territory, and instituted a form of politics in Egypt that allowed for some multi-party representation. Sadat's tenure also witnessed a rise in governmental corruption, and a widening of the gulf between rich and poor, both of which would become hallmarks of the presidency of his successor, Hosni Mubarak. On 6 October 1973, Egypt under Sadat, and Syria under Hafez al-Assad, initiated the October War to liberate Egyptian and Syrian territory that had been under Israeli occupation since the Six-Day War of 1967. Egyptian and Syrian forces separately crossed ceasefire lines into Egypt's Sinai Peninsula, and Syria's Golan Heights respectively, enjoying major successes in the first half of the war. The second half of the war saw a successful Israeli counterstrike, with Egypt and Syria sustaining heavy casualties. The ceasefire which ended the war left Egypt holding newly-liberated land in Sinai on the east bank of Suez Canal, but also with Israeli forces holding newly-captured land on the west bank of the Canal. Notwithstanding the military reversals suffered in the closing stages of the war, Sadat was seen as having restored Egyptian pride following the devastating defeat of 1967, and convinced the Israeli leadership that the status quo was no longer tenable. Via negotiations brokered by U.S. President Jimmy Carter, Sadat and Israeli prime minister Menachem Begin signed the Egypt–Israel peace treaty by which Egypt formally recognised the State of Israel in exchange for a complete end to the Israeli occupation of Egypt's Sinai Peninsula, and autonomy for the Palestinian Gaza Strip and West Bank. Hafez al-Assad, and other Arab leaders, refused to participate in the negotiations, condemned the agreement, and suspended Egypt from the Arab League, beginning a period of near complete regional isolation for Egypt. Domestic opposition to the treaty was immense across all sectors of Egyptian society, however, the most vociferous denunciation was from Islamists, a group of whom from within Egypt's own armed forces plotted and executed Sadat's assassination several years later on the anniversary of the beginning of the October War.

== Early years ==
After Nasser's death, another of the original revolutionary "Free Officers," then-Vice President Anwar el-Sadat, was elected President of Egypt. Nasser's supporters in government settled on Sadat as a transitional figure that—they believed—could be manipulated easily. Sadat lacked Nasser's charisma and popularity and "inspired neither awe nor envy." However, he enjoyed a long term in office and had many changes in mind for Egypt; by some astute political moves, he was able to institute a "corrective revolution" (announced on 15 May 1971) that purged the government, political, and security establishments of the most ardent Nasserists. Sadat encouraged the emergence of an Islamist movement which had been suppressed by Nasser. Seeing Islamists as socially conservative, he gave them "considerable cultural and ideological autonomy" in exchange for political support.

Following the disastrous Six-Day War of 1967, Egypt waged a War of Attrition in the Suez Canal zone. In 1971, four years into this war, Sadat endorsed in a letter the peace proposals of UN negotiator Gunnar Jarring, which seemed to lead to a full peace with Israel on the basis of Israel's withdrawal to its pre-war borders. This peace initiative failed, as neither Israel nor the United States of America accepted the terms as discussed then. To provide Israel with more incentive to negotiate with Egypt and return the Sinai to it, and also because the Soviets had refused Sadat's requests for more military support, Sadat expelled the Soviet military advisers from Egypt and proceeded to bolster his army for a renewed confrontation with Israel.

== Yom Kippur War ==
1972 film about the then deteriorating relationship between the Soviet Union and Sadat's Egypt

In 1971, Sadat concluded a treaty of friendship with the Soviet Union, but a year later ordered Soviet advisers to leave. Soviets were engaged in détente with the United States and discouraged Egypt from attacking Israel. Sadat favored another war with Israel in hopes of regaining the Sinai peninsula and reviving a country demoralized from the 1967 war. He hoped that at least a limited victory over the Israelis would alter the status quo. In the months before the war Sadat engaged in a diplomatic offensive and by the fall of 1973 had support for a war of more than a hundred states, including most of the countries of the Arab League, Non-Aligned Movement, and Organization of African Unity. Syria agreed to join Egypt in attacking Israel.

Egypt's armed forces achieved initial successes in the Crossing and advanced 15 km, reaching the depth of the range of safe coverage of its own air force. Having defeated the Israeli forces to this extent, Egyptian forces, rather than advancing under air cover, decided to immediately penetrate further into the Sinai desert. In spite of huge losses they kept advancing, creating the chance to open a gap between army forces. That gap was exploited by a tank division led by Ariel Sharon, and he and his tanks managed to penetrate onto Egyptian soil, reaching Suez city. In the meantime, the United States initiated a strategic airlift to provide replacement weapons and supplies to Israel and appropriate $2.2 billion in emergency aid. OPEC oil ministers, led by Saudi Arabia retaliated with an oil embargo against the US. A UN resolution supported by the United States and the Soviet Union called for an end to hostilities and for peace talks to begin. On 4 March 1974 Israel withdrew the last of its troops from the west side of the Suez Canal, and 12 days later Arab oil ministers announced the end of the embargo against the United States. Sadat and many Egyptians saw the war as a victory, as the initial Egyptian successes restored Egyptian pride, and led to peace talks with the Israelis that eventually led to Egypt regaining the entire Sinai peninsula in exchange for a peace agreement.

== Domestic policy and the Infitah ==
Sadat used his immense popularity with the Egyptian people to try to push through vast economic reforms that ended the socialistic controls of Nasserism. Sadat introduced greater political freedom and a new economic policy, the most important aspect of which was the infitah or "openness". This relaxed government controls over the economy and encouraged private investment. While the reforms created a wealthy and successful upper class and a small middle class, these reforms had little effect upon the average Egyptian who began to grow dissatisfied with Sadat's rule. In 1977, Infitah policies led to massive spontaneous riots ('Bread Riots') involving hundreds of thousands of Egyptians when the state announced that it was retiring subsidies on basic foodstuffs. Infitah has been criticized as bringing "wild rents, land speculations, inflation, and corruption."

During Sadat's presidency, Egyptians began to receive more of their income from abroad. Between 1974 and 1985, more than three million Egyptians—construction workers, labourers, mechanics, plumbers, electricians as well as young teachers and accountants—migrated to the Persian Gulf region. Remittances from these workers allowed families in Egypt to buy "refrigerators, TV sets, video recorders, cars and flats."

Liberalization also included the reinstitution of due process and the legal banning of torture. Sadat dismantled much of the existing political machine and brought to trial a number of former government officials accused of criminal excesses during the Nasser era. Sadat tried to expand participation in the political process in the mid-1970s but later abandoned this effort. In the last years of his life, Egypt was wracked by violence arising from discontent with Sadat's rule and sectarian tensions, and it experienced a renewed measure of repression including extra judicial arrests.

== International relations and the Camp David Accords ==
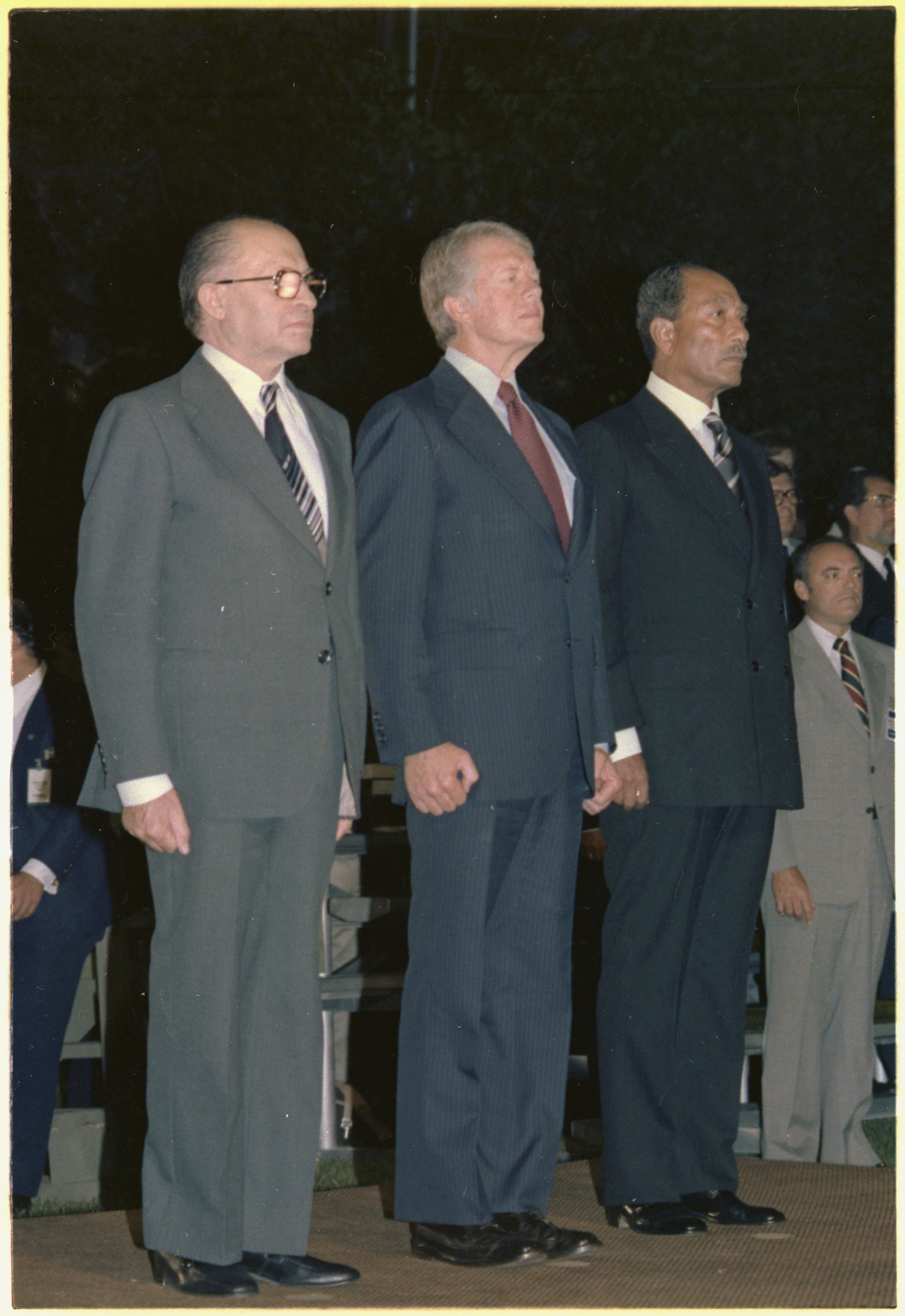
Celebrating the signing of the Camp David Accords: Menachem Begin, Jimmy Carter, Anwar Al Sadat.

In foreign relations Sadat also launched momentous change from the Nasser era. President Sadat shifted Egypt from a policy of confrontation with Israel to one of peaceful accommodation through negotiations. Following the Sinai Disengagement Agreements of 1974 and 1975, Sadat created a fresh opening for progress by his dramatic visit to Jerusalem in November 1977. This led to the invitation from President Jimmy Carter of the United States to President Sadat and Israeli prime minister Begin to enter trilateral negotiations at Camp David.

The outcome was the historic Camp David accords, signed by Egypt and Israel and witnessed by the US on 17 September 1978. The accords led to the 26 March 1979, signing of the Egypt–Israel peace treaty, by which Egypt regained control of the Sinai in April 1982. Throughout this period, US–Egyptian relations steadily improved, and Egypt became one of America's largest recipients of foreign aid. Sadat's willingness to break ranks by making peace with Israel earned him the enmity of most other Arab states, however. Egypt was suspended from the Arab League, and in 1977 it fought a short border war with Libya.

In October 1978, Sadat reportedly offered Ugandan President Idi Amin aid in form of military equipment, as his country invaded Tanzania. According to researcher Mark Yared, Egypt was one of the countries which provided Uganda with "multiform aid" during the Uganda–Tanzania War.

== Islamic revival ==
In his first public speech after Egypt's defeat at the hand of the Israel, Sadat's predecessor Abdul Nasser called for religion to play a more important role in society. The line is said to have drawn "an exceptionally enthusiastic roar of applause" by the Egyptian audience, and three years later when the 1970s began, religiosity was ascendant in Egypt (as in much of the Muslim world). Beards on men and hijab on women became more popular. Religious programs appeared on state TV and radio. Islamic preachers (such as Sheikh Muhammad Metwally Al Shaarawy) began to take prominence as symbols of popular Egyptian culture. Novels, plays, science-fiction, philosophy books singing the praises of Islam, often by converts from secularism. (An example being My Itinerary from Doubt to Belief, an autobiography by a very popular Egyptian writer, Dr. Mustafa Mahmud, who had formerly been a staunch believer in scientific positivism, human engineering, and materialism. Another prominent ex-secularist convert was Khalid Muhammad Khalid.) The revival led to greater attendance in prayer and growth of non-state-controlled neighborhood mosques, but also to at least some conflict with the minority Coptic Christians of Egypt, an example being Islamist castigation of Muslim participation in the all-Egyptian spring holiday Sham el-Nessim. The picnicking festival, which has pre-Islamic roots, was attacked as a means for bringing about the "destruction of Islam in Egypt".

Observers trace the revival to disenchantment with Arab Nationalism, as exemplified by Egypt's "shattering" 1967 defeat; the perceived victory of the 1973 war with its pious battle cry of Allahu Akbar ("Land, Sea and Air" had been the slogan of the 1967 war); and "to the missionary zeal" of Saudi Wahhabism, "fueled by petrodollars in the wake of the oil shock of 1974-5."

=== Islamist impact ===
Another change Sadat made from the Nasser era was a bow towards the Islamic revival. Sadat loosened restrictions on the Muslim Brotherhood, allowing it to publish a monthly magazine, al-Dawa, which appeared regularly until September 1981 (although he did not allow the group's reconstitution). In 1971, the concentration camps where Islamists were held were closed, and the regime began to gradually release the imprisoned Muslim Brothers, though the organisation itself remained illegal; the last of those still behind bars regained their freedom in the general amnesty of 1975.

Sadat also considered Islamists, particularly al-Gama'a al-Islamiyya, a "useful counterweight" to his communist and socialist opposition, student groups being particularly vocal and active. From 1973 to 1979 al-Gama'a al-Islamiyya grew (in part with help from the Sadat regime) from a minority group to being "in complete control of the universities" with the communist and socialist organizations being driven underground.

In the late 1970s, he began calling himself "The Believer President" and signing his name Mohammad Anwar Sadat. He ordered Egypt's state-run television to interrupt programs with the adhan (call to prayer) on the screen five times a day and to increase religious programming. Under his rule local officials banned the sale of alcohol except at places catering to foreign tourists in more than half of Egypt's 26 governorates.

However, Islamists came to clash with Sadat who supported women's rights and opposed compulsory hijab. Most particularly they opposed what they called his "shameful peace with the Jews," aka the Camp David Accords with Israel. By the late 1970s the government turned against Islamism. In June 1981, after a brutal sectarian Muslim-Copt fight in the poor al-Zawaiyya Al Hamra district of Cairo, Al-Gama'a al-Islamiyya was dissolved by the state their infrastructure was destroyed and their leaders arrested."

According to interviews and information gathered by journalist Lawrence Wright, the radical Islamist group Egyptian Islamic Jihad was recruiting military officers and accumulating weapons, waiting for the right moment to launch "a complete overthrow of the existing order" in Egypt, killing the main leaders of the country, capturing the crucial headquarters of regime institutions, spreading news of the Islamic coup, which they hoped would unleash a popular uprising against secular authority all over the country."

In February 1981, Egyptian authorities were alerted to El-Jihad's plan by the arrest of an operative carrying crucial information. In September, Sadat ordered a highly unpopular roundup of more than 1,500 people, including many Jihad members, but also the Coptic Pope and other Coptic clergy, intellectuals and activists of all ideological stripes. All non-government press was banned as well. The round up missed a Jihad cell in the military led by Lieutenant Khalid Islambouli, who succeeded in assassinating Anwar Sadat that October.

Sadat was succeeded by his Vice president Hosni Mubarak.

== See also ==
- History of Egypt under Gamal Abdel Nasser
- History of Egypt under Hosni Mubarak
- Infitah
- Assassination of Anwar Sadat
- Egyptian Revolutionary Command Council
- History of modern Egypt
- List of modern conflicts in the Middle East
