= Sky Jet =

Sky Jet, Skyjets, or variation, may refer to:

== Airlines ==
- SkyJet Airlines (IATA airline code: M8; ICAO airline code: MSJ; callsign: MAGNUM AIR) Philippine airline
- Skyjet Airlines (IATA airline code: UQ; ICAO airline code: SJU; callsign: SKYJET) defunct Ugandan airline
- ASL Airlines Spain (IATA airline code: PV; ICAO airline code: PNR; callsign: SKYJET) Spanish cargo airline
- Sky Jet (ICAO airline code: SWY; callsign: SWISSLINK) Swiss airline, see List of airline codes (S)
- Skyjet (ICAO airline code: SEK; callsign: SKALA) Kazakhstani airline, see List of defunct airlines of Kazakhstan
- Skyjet (ICAO airline code: SKT) Belgian defunct airline, see List of defunct airlines of Belgium
- Skyjet Aviation, a Canadian charter airline, a division of Groupe La Québécoise

== Air charter services ==
- Skyjet International, executive aircraft charter business founded by Bombardier now a division of VistaJet
- Skyjet, a division of Directional Aviation, a reservation system for business jets, founded by Trevor Cornwell, see Trevor Cornwell#Skyjet

== Other uses ==
- Skyjet (スカイジェット, Sukaijetto), a fictional character, see List of Kamen Rider Fourze characters
- Skyjet (スカイジェット, Sukaijetto), a fictional character, see Space Ironman Kyodain

== See also ==
- Skyjet Brazil, defunct Brazilian airline, see List of defunct airlines of Brazil
- Eastern SkyJets (IATA airline code: EE; ICAO airline code: ESJ; callsign: EASTERN SKYJETS) defunct Emirati charter airline
