= Smukler =

Smukler is a surname. Notable people with the surname include:

- Alexander Smukler, Russian businessman
- David Smukler (1914–1971), American football player
- Ken Smukler (born 1960), American politician
