= Disengage =

Disengage may refer to:

- "Disengage" (song), by Suicide Silence
- Disengage (album), the third and final album by Circle of Dust
- Disen Gage, a Russian rock band
- Disengage, a straight edge hardcore band with members of Title Fight and Bad Seed.
- "Disengage" (Star Trek: Picard), an episode of the third season of Star Trek: Picard

== See also ==
- Disengagement (disambiguation)
- Engagement (disambiguation)
- Engaged (disambiguation)
- Engage (disambiguation)
