= Engage =

Engage or variation, may refer to:

- Engagement in preparation for marriage
- Engagé, 18th-19th century engaged contract workers
- Engage (organisation), a UK-based political organization
- Engage (visual arts), the UK National Association for Gallery Education
- Engagement (military) during a military battle or a shootout

== See also ==
- N-Gage, a Nokia mobile device
- N scale, the model railway N gauge
- Engaged (disambiguation)
- Engagement (disambiguation)
- Disengage (disambiguation)
- Disengagement (disambiguation)
- Rules of Engagement (disambiguation)
- Jean-Luc Picard, captain of the USS Enterprise (NCC-1701-D) in Star Trek
