= Neoliberalism in the Middle East and North Africa =

During the post-war period, many leaders of the MENA region enacted an economic growth model based on import substitution industrialization, in which the state intervened heavily in the public and private sectors to enhance economic growth. The quality of the reforms was largely dependent on the quality of the political regimes in place. By the 1970s, corruption and rigidities in the public sector, as well as global economic developments, had halted economic growth. In the 1980s, MENA countries began to adopt neoliberal Structural Adjustment Packages (SAP), which advocated for open markets and the removal of trade barriers. Market deregulations, Public-Private Partnerships (PPPs), and opening the region up to the world market facilitated enormous economic and social transformations that defined MENA’s last four decades. While neoliberalist policies succeeded in generating significant economic growth, they left much of MENA’s population unemployed. This sparked repeated social unrest, which, in turn, was counteracted by the rise of authoritarian dictators that were supported by the IMF and World Bank. As such, neoliberalism’s effects on MENA continue to be a widely disputed and controversial subject that has undoubtedly left a large mark on the region.

Beginning in the late 1960s, several neoliberal reforms were implemented in the Middle East. For instance, Egypt is frequently linked to the implementation of neoliberal policies, particularly the 'open-door' policies of President Anwar Sadat throughout the 1970s and Hosni Mubarak's successive economic reforms between 1981 and 2011. These measures, known as al-Infitah, were later diffused across the region. In Tunisia, neoliberal economic policies are associated with the former president and de facto dictator Zine El Abidine Ben Ali; his reign made it clear that economic neoliberalism can coexist and even be encouraged by authoritarian states. Responses to globalization and economic reforms in the Gulf have also been approached via a neoliberal analytical framework.

== Contradictions to state-led growth ==
After gaining independence during the interbellum and after the Second World War, many leaders of Middle Eastern and North African (MENA) states saw themselves as engineers of new states to reverse the ‘backwardness’ of their economic development. While ideologies varied per country, almost all Middle Eastern states adopted an economic model of import substitution industrialization (ISI). In Egypt, where the strategy was implemented with vigor during the 1950 and 1960s, the prevailing thought was that only the state could mobilize and organize the necessary resources efficiently to prevent excessive waste of resources. Especially with regard to the areas within the Middle East, overall the education levels were inadequate, and their economies were based on an agricultural system with low productivity and inefficient use of scarce capital. These developments were exemplified by a large civil service and large labor force for public projects enacted by the state. This required a high quality of political leadership to enforce the state's effectiveness of these policies. Moreover, the state monopolized resources through the nationalization of many sectors. They controlled investment budgets, important parts of the banking system, mineral wealth and materials, and important infrastructure parts like roads, railways, power plants, and ports.

Another important element of the ISI economic model was the emphasis on equity. As a result of colonial dominance in the nineteenth and early twentieth centuries, gross inequalities were prevalent in the MENA countries by the time they became independent. The implementation of agrarian reform programs, as well as nationalizations of private and foreign assets and the prevalence of state-wide education, were examples of how to wipe out class differences. Sometimes, these policies were aggressively encouraged, for example during the Nasser regime in Egypt.

The economic growth model of rational planning required a strategy for developing such large-scale programs. Since there was little capital investment in the private sector, the state needed to deliver economic levers to implement the large structural economic reforms. Throughout the region, there was no trust in the fact that the private sector could undertake these large-scale mobilization and planning projects. Important reasons for the distrust were that the private sector was financially too weak to sustain these programs. Moreover, their focus on short-term profits over long-term structural transformation made them an unreliable partner.

The state dominated the private sector in many countries and implemented many infrastructural projects. The state would provide roads, railroads, ports, and energy stations to stimulate economic activity in the public and private sectors. Moreover, the state took over and provided the raw material industry, providing the necessary materials to create cheap manufactured goods. To stimulate the private sector financially, the governments intervened in the capital markets and provided cheap loans with small interest rates to acquire cheap credit. Its legislation was aimed at protecting the state companies and preventing capital from flowing out of the country. The state was also active in taking over enterprises that were failing to prevent high unemployment figures. Profits were used to further expand the activities with little regard to the private sector. The state interventions were connected to important entrepreneurs in these societies. In effect, social contracts became political instruments through which the citizens of MENA were restricted from political participation. They received many economic and social provisions. The success of the state-led growth model was reflected in their economic growth figures. Even while the oil crisis started to create economic problems in the 1970s, the economy of Syria grew by 7 percent, while the economy of Jordan grew by even 12 percent.

The strength of these states was different on a case-by-case basis, and many of these ISI-development-led states stumbled upon obstacles. The potential for creating a strong and nationalized state was dependent on large investments in the military. However, such investments resulted from rampant corruption and patronage between the government and the military classes.

On top of that, huge state bureaucracies started to paralyze in the 1970s as a result of slow and inefficient organization. The structural transformation of the MENA economies in the post-war period was tied to human capital formation. However, the rapidity of population growth, the expansion of the military budgets, the limited resources other than oil, and the low literacy levels meant that the economic downturn had grave consequences. Moreover, infant industries were seldom internationally competitive. Products in the country remained expensive and of low quality. The focus on heavy industry also failed to create new jobs in the private sector. With a young population, the state had to create new jobs to prevent unemployment from soaring.

Externally, the oil crisis of 1973 had a different impact on MENA countries, depending on the type of economy these countries possessed. Oil-abundant countries in the Gulf benefited a lot from the oil booms of the 1970s. Iran in the 1960s and Saudi Arabia in the 1970s grew about 8 percent per capita. Countries that did not have oil reserves but had a labor abundance, such as Turkey, Egypt, and Morocco, were confronted by mounting fiscal problems and huge sums of debt. Their debt crisis ultimately led to a transition in the economic growth model of the Middle East. From the 1970s onwards, the crisis of these models led to a transition to a neoliberal paradigm. In some states, such as Egypt, early forms and policies of neoliberalism were enacted in 1974 with the Infitah program. The state-led development that characterized the region was replaced, both through internal and external factors, by a neoliberal model in which the state retreated.

== Transition to neoliberalism ==
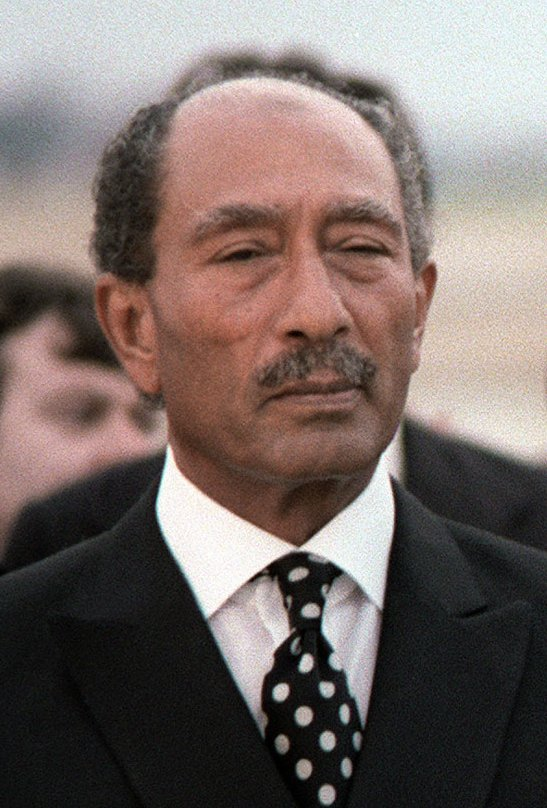
Egyptian president Anwar Sadat was an important figure who enacted the open-door policy.

By the 1980s, the process of state-led intervention had resulted in a deep crisis in both the public and private sectors in the MENA countries. Privatization was the centerpiece of the changes needed to open their economies. While global economic processes transformed under the influence of the neoliberal tide, the 1980s in MENA countries were marked by a slow transition. This was mainly the result of many societal forces resisting neoliberal reforms. As a result, the history of the Structural Adjustment Programs (SAPs) in the MENA countries can be divided into two phases. The 1980s were a period of small and modest reforms to the existing state-led growth systems. Only during the 1990s and 2000s did people see an acceleration of privatization, deregulation, and liberalization, in which many public-owned companies were privatized.

Since the early 1980s, all major international financial institutions have advocated for the need for neoliberal reforms. The advent of Margaret Thatcher in Britain and Ronald Reagan in the United States kicked off their countries' privatization, deregulation, and liberalization measures. Institutions such as the International Monetary Fund (IMF) and the World Bank also advocated the neoliberal paradigm. Countries would get loans on the basis that certain conditionalities were used and implemented. The reports of these financial institutions in the Middle East were typically constructed in a discourse of crisis. The region would be hit by an economic crisis, such as a high unemployment rate and low economic growth, if it did not change its economic policy. This discourse of an imminent crisis was important to create an opportunity for a new economic outlook based on market mechanisms and with the retreatment of the state from the economy.

In the MENA countries, the advent of the neoliberal turn led to a further divergence between resource-rich, labor-abundant countries (RRLA) and resource-poor, labor-abundant countries (RPLA). Countries that had large oil reserves did not undertake large structural adjustments, as their regimes would not tolerate international actors outside their direct control. Increasingly, their regimes were dependent on repression and patronage in their alliances with powerful actors to remain in power. In countries without natural resources such as oil or gas, political regimes had to find new ways to enhance economic growth while their debt levels accelerated. From their perspectives, the Structural Adjustment Programs (SAP) of the World Bank and the IMF were meant to create a new alliance with business elites. It could cut the dominance of organized labor and the bureaucratic elite.

== Initial resistance to neoliberal reforms ==
One of the problems with reforming the MENA economies was that the states had provided privileges to certain market entrepreneurs. When confidence in state-led development strategies declined, reforms were not always initiated. Economic reforms would challenge the ruling elites controlling large parts of the economy.

Another component that hindered reforms was the strength of organized labor, which opposed any form of reform. Their relatively high wages, work benefits, and job stability meant that they hindered any reform that diminished their privileges. Cammett has called the public sector in many MENA countries a form of 'labor aristocracy', who defended their privileges in the name of socialism and with the fear of large unemployment figures. Yet, while organized labor opposed any reform, they did not want to pay the price of developing a more efficient public sector.

Moreover, the managers of the public sector industries also resisted reforms from their privileged positions. During the post-war period, a new managerial class led the low-productivity and high-deficit enterprises. Due to their low productivity and high costs, they often received periodic bailouts from the state. Their jobs in the public sector were more secure, and the high salaries were a reason not to switch to the private sector. The post-war system had produced a state bourgeoisie that resisted attempts to reform the increasingly rigid public-owned enterprises.

Initially, many MENA states tried to delay and prevent the liberalization and structural reforms for as long as possible. Austerity was a major risk to the leaders because it was perceived as a sign of a failing regime. Frequently, they led to violent uprisings in urban areas. MENA countries filled their resource gaps for the largest part by extensive borrowing from EEC countries or the United States. In resource-rich countries, these gaps could be compensated by the export of oil or gas. However, the financial situation in Egypt, Jordan, Morocco, and Tunisia became so unsustainable that structural adjustments were the only alternative to state-led growth. In many cases, privatization was eventually done with a lack of transparency to protect the interests of the governing elite or their allies.

== Policies used ==
=== SAP policies ===
In the early 1980s, financial discourse spread warnings of an impending financial crisis in the MENA region. Financial institutions claimed that the rapid expansion of the region’s labor force could not be satisfied by its slow employment growth, predicting skyrocketing unemployment levels and enormous social discontent. It was argued that only economic reform companies could prevent this inevitable economic crisis, completely ignoring the Western-imposed dependency on external markets and twenty years of occupation and conflict. This culminated in the adoption of IMF-sponsored Structural Adjustment Packages (SAPs), which aimed to accelerate economic growth across the MENA region rapidly. Open markets and the removal of barriers to the private sector became central parts of the SAP policies, mainly dominated by Egypt, Morocco, and Tunisia.

=== Egypt case study ===
Egypt quickly emerged as the region’s clear leader in terms of privatization, mainly because of its earlier 1974 Infitah policy, which, in the spirit of neoliberalism, opened the doors to private sector investment and capital liberalization. In the 1980s, under Anwar Sadat, Egypt began to sell its state assets and terminate the subsidies of state-owned companies, encouraging them to compete on the market autonomously. These restructuring processes were fueled by taking out loans from international institutions, which steadily increased Egypt's state debt. In addition, Egypt was the first country in the Global South to attempt the so-called Employees Shareholders Associations (ESAs). These were pushed by USAID, and privatized the Transport and Engineering Company (TRENCO), a publicly owned tire-producing company with a big share of the Egyptian market. However, the supposed promise to democratize Egyptian capital ownership was never fully followed through as ESAs offloaded the country’s debt burden onto the workers, who only received small proportions of the company’s share. By the 1990s, almost all Egyptian privatization processes utilized employee ownership to achieve state divestment. This only accelerated in the early 2000s, and by 2008, privatization had taken over the country’s telecommunications, banking, and real estate sectors. As a result, Egypt recorded the largest number of privatized firms across the region, leading to the World Bank terming it the "region’s top reformer".

=== Market deregulation ===
In the 2000s, the IMF’s loan packages identified labor market deregulation as a top priority, which followed the idea that if wages were lowered, investment would become more attractive to the private sector. This erosion of public sector working conditions was closely related to the ongoing privatization process across the MENA region. Hence, private sector employers were able to lower their wages and still attract workers, who had no choice but to accept. Egypt, Jordan, Morocco, and Tunisia all followed this deregulation process, introducing temporary contracts and making it easier to fire public sector workers, sparking controversy and protests.

=== Public-private partnerships (PPPs) ===
MENA’s privatization process focused on the use of Public-Private Partnerships (PPPs), arrangements between government agencies and private-sector companies to complete public projects such as constructing power plants or distributing water. The country of Jordan moved fastest, with 40% of its population receiving drinking water from private providers by 2006. Nevertheless, many essential services continue to be run by MENA governments, and international financial institutions such as the EIB have since identified PPPs as a strategic avenue to deepen neoliberalism in the region.

=== Opening to the world market ===
By 2004, Tunisia, Egypt, Morocco, and Jordan had all joined the WTO and established Association Agreements with the EU or FTAs with the United States. Capital flows were quickly drawn towards MENA’s relatively cheap labor, which increased competition for domestic capital. This accelerated the neoliberal shift and transformed the region’s economy into private, market and export-oriented activities. The four countries proceeded to cut tariffs and eliminate nontariff barriers, as well as reduce regulations to increase FDI into the region. However, the accession of the WTO also flooded the countries’ domestic markets with cheap textiles, massively damaging domestic companies. For instance, clothing imports increased by 500% in Egypt while domestic production stagnated, further deteriorating labor rights and wages.

=== Restructuring of financial markets ===
Lastly, IFIs advocated for the removal of government market control, opening up the banking sector to foreign competition, and introducing mortgage, bond, and equity markets. Such liberalization of credit resulted in the expansion of financial institutions, which became increasingly interconnected with the industry. Financial markets brought all the components of the neoliberal project together by strengthening the power of the biggest conglomerates over every aspect of the region’s social life.

== Social & economic impacts ==
=== Social ===
Since the gradual implementation of neoliberal policies across the MENA region, basic economic and social rights have been gradually eroded. The Washington Consensus predicted enormous economic growth between 1980 and 2000, but the MENA region experienced economic stagnation, resulting in "the lost decades". Growth accelerated between 2003 and 2008 but came at the expense of the region’s youth and women. Privatization and deregulation policies reduced wages and employment securities, reflected in high unemployment statistics. This was reflected in the region’s continuously high unemployment statistics, with Jordan, Tunisia, Morocco, and Egypt each registering over 10 percent. This trend continued well into the 2000s, as Egypt’s largest category of unemployed people was made up of female university graduates. As MENA’s unemployment rates and informal sectors expanded, poverty skyrocketed. In 2006, 40% of Egyptians and Moroccans and 24% of Tunesians lived below the poverty line. These rates have decreased significantly in recent years, and in 2015, only 15% of Egyptians and Tunesians and less than 5% of Moroccans still lived below the poverty line. Nevertheless, it is clear that MENA’s neoliberal policies and public spending cuts negatively impacted social conditions. Such policies were met with repeated waves of protest, such as demonstrations and strikes. To overcome these protests and successfully implement neoliberalism, dictatorships and authoritarian regimes rose up.

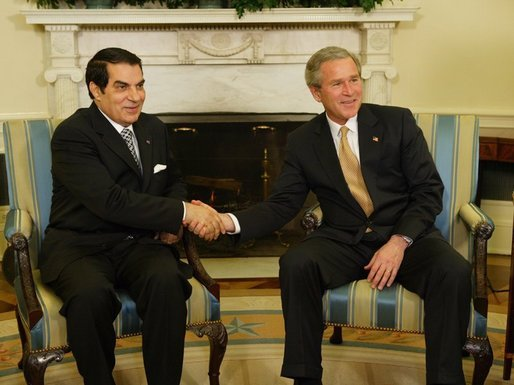
Tunesian Ben Ali with President Bush in 2004. Ben Ali started the neoliberal reforms in Tunesia.

Tunisia’s Zine El Abidine Ben Ali, backed by Europe, the US, and the World Bank, truly commenced the country’s neoliberalism era. Similarly, Egypt’s Mubarak expanded the infitah policies and was swiftly endorsed by the World Bank and the IMF. These dictators were able to turn to their military and security forces to extinguish MENA’s widespread protests and implement their neoliberal reforms. This symbiosis of authoritarian power and neoliberal governance across MENA continued to deteriorate the social conditions of its population, and its long-term impact can still be felt today.

=== Economic ===
While neoliberalism had a negative effect on the majority of MENA's population, it did eventually facilitate significant economic growth. The region’s cheap labor and informal workforce encouraged an increase in domestic capital and provided profitable opportunities for foreign investors. For instance, Morocco, Egypt, Tunisia, and Jordan’s annual GDP growth rates averaged over 5 percent between 2003 and 2008. Nevertheless, the region’s wealth became concentrated in a wealthy domestic capitalist class that soon claimed ownership of the major economic sectors. In essence, neoliberalism effectively redistributed wealth from the region’s poorest to the most wealthy classes of society, which had always remained at the core of the neoliberal project in the region. This development remains a crucial element when assessing the revolutionary dynamics of the Arab Spring in 2011.
