= The Sushi Economy =

2007 nonfiction book

- Author: Sasha Issenberg
- Language: English
- Genre: Non-fiction
- Publication date: 2008
- ISBN: 1-59240-294-1

The Sushi Economy by Sasha Issenberg is a nonfiction book about sushi and globalization. It was released in 2008.

The Sushi Economy uses the booming business, culture, and cuisine of raw fish to examine how the integration of local economies through trade works in practice. The book takes the form of a global travelogue ranging from Atlantic bluefin tuna fishermen in Gloucester, Massachusetts, to Japan's Tsukiji fish market in Tokyo, to tuna pirates in the Mediterranean, to an Austin, Texas sushi bar, to the global restaurant empire of Nobu Matsuhisa and the tuna ranchers of Port Lincoln, South Australia. The book synthesized widely available information on the global impact of Japan's appetite for seafood.
