= Votecastr =

American election results company

- Company type: Private
- Industry: Politics
- Founded: September 10, 2016; 9 years ago
- Founders: Ken Smukler; Sasha Issenberg; Trevor Cornwell
- Area served: Worldwide
- Key people: Ken Smukler (CEO/Co-Founder); Sasha Issenberg (Co-Founder); Trevor Cornwell (Co-Founder)

Votecastr is a private company, founded in 2016, to track, model, and publish real-time election results from the 2016 Presidential Election, on November 8, 2016.

On September 10, 2016, Votecastr was profiled in The New York Times by Nick Corasaniti, and announced its partnership with Slate.com to publish the data on Election Day. Additionally, co-founder Sasha Issenberg published a piece on Slate.com outline Votecastr's Election Day strategy.

== Background ==
During the U.S. Presidential Election of 1980, NBC News projected Reagan as the winner at 8:15 pm EST (5:15 PST), before voting was finished in the West, based on exit polls; it was the first time a broadcast network used exit polling to project a winner, and took the other broadcast networks by surprise. Carter conceded defeat at 9:50 pm EST.

Since that year, Sasha Issenberg explains the "self-imposed gag order" of the Media Networks:

The networks’ early calls prompted a congressional inquiry into whether they had depressed West Coast turnout. The three broadcast networks rejected demands that they wait until everyone in the country had voted to report or forecast any results. (There was scant evidence that NBC’s early call had exerted any influence on voter behavior or outcomes.) As a concession, however, the networks promised not to use their exit polls to project the race in a given state until polls had closed there. In the years that followed, other news organizations that had not been subject to the same political pressure—radio stations, newspapers, wire services, cable networks, and websites—nonetheless accepted it as a controlling precedent. Now a de-facto self-imposed gag order hangs over the daylight hours of the year’s biggest news event, sequestering the civic exercise of Election Day from the media spectacle of election night. This distinction is enforced only by the pieties of good-government advocates who, in the wake of the 1980 episode, paternalistically argued that voters cannot be trusted with live information.

== 2016 Election ==
Votecastr's 6:30 PM numbers correctly projected a win for Donald Trump in Iowa, Ohio, and Pennsylvania, and wins for Hillary Clinton in Colorado, New Hampshire, and Nevada, but missed Donald Trump's victories in Florida and Wisconsin.

== Co-Founders ==
Listed on their website:

- Ken Smukler, Entrepreneur
- Sasha Issenberg, Journalist
- Trevor Cornwell, Entrepreneur

== Partners ==
Listed on their website:

- InfoVoter Technologies
- appbackr
- Haystaq DNA
- General Industries Network

== See also ==
- 2016 United States presidential election
- 1980 United States presidential election
