= Israeli disengagement plan =

There have been several Israeli disengagement plans:

- Israeli disengagement from Gaza, a 2005 unilateral disengagement and pull-out on the part of Israel from the Gaza Strip
- Sinai Disengagement Agreements, disengagement plans between Egypt and Israel over the Sinai Peninsula from the mid-1970s
- Agreement on Disengagement between Israel and Syria, disengagement plan between Syria and Israel over the Golan Heights
- Jordan's disengagement from the West Bank, Jordan's disengagement from Israel and the West Bank in 1988 over the West Bank
