= Sasha Issenberg =

American journalist

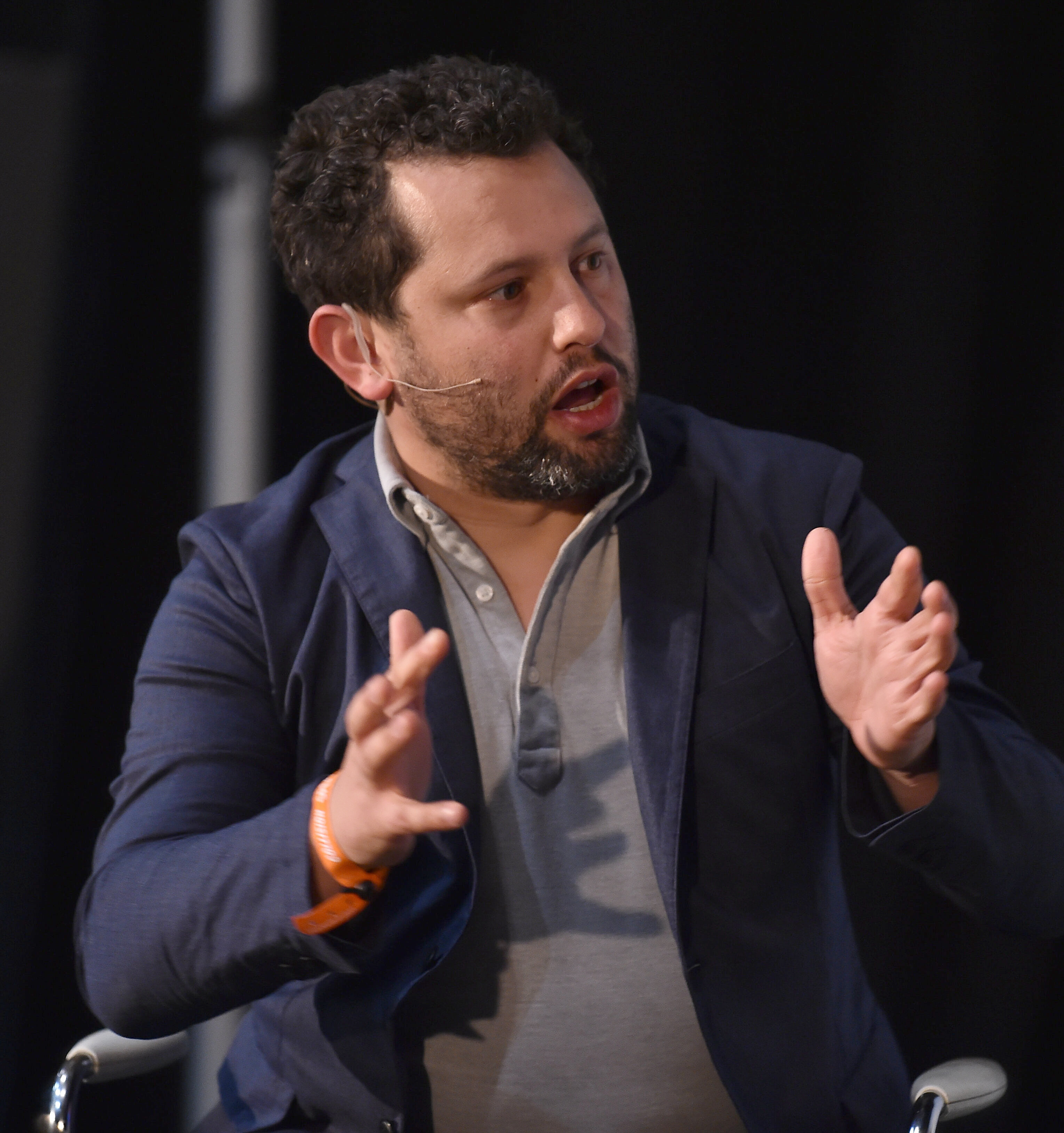
- At the Collision 2017 conference in New Orleans
- Education: Swarthmore College
- Occupation: Journalist

Sasha Issenberg is an American journalist. His articles have been published in Philadelphia, Slate, the Washington Monthly, The New York Times Magazine, The Atlantic, Boston, The Boston Globe, Monocle, Politico, The Wall Street Journal, The Washington Post and George, where he was a contributing editor.

== Biography ==
Issenberg was born to a Jewish family and is a 2002 graduate of Swarthmore College.

In 2016, he covered the 2016 presidential campaign for Bloomberg News.

In 2016, he co-founded the company Votecastr, to track the 2016 Presidential Election in real-time, publishing the results of turnout tracking at Poll Locations online throughout the day.

In 2018, he was named the UC Regents' Professor at UCLA, where he taught a course on understanding presidential campaign victories through the stories reporters, academics, and historians tell about those victories.

His writing typically focuses on politics, business, diplomacy, and culture. Issenberg covered the 2008 election as a reporter for The Boston Globe.

== Books ==
He is the author of the book The Sushi Economy, about sushi and globalization, which was published in May 2007. He is also the author of The Victory Lab: The Secret Science of Winning Campaigns about the new science of political campaigns. He has also written a book on medical tourism and one on The Engagement: America's Quarter-Century Struggle Over Same-Sex Marriage. His most recent book is The Lie Detectives: In Search of a Playbook for Defeating Disinformation and Winning Elections.
