= Engagement (disambiguation) =

Engagement is the relationship between two people who intend to marry.

Engagement may also refer to:

- Engagement (diplomacy), public diplomacy, communication and foreign aid
- Engagement (marketing), a marketing strategy used to engage customers
- Engagement (military), the use of a munition, weapon or decoy to carry out an offensive or defensive action
- Engagement (pregnancy), the movement of a baby's head into the pelvic cavity
- The Engagement (1647), an agreement between King Charles I and a faction of the Scottish Covenanters during the First English Civil War
- Engagement letter between a client and an accounting or legal firm
- Employee engagement, a measure of an employee's positive or negative emotional attachment to their job, colleagues and organization
- Civic engagement, individual or group activity addressing issues of public concern
- Social engagement, a measure of one's engagement with a community or society
- Student engagement, students' involvement, participation, and interaction with their work, learning, and school community
- "Engagement" (The Vicar of Dibley)
- "The Engagement" (Don't Wait Up)
- "The Engagement" (The Golden Girls)
- "The Engagement" (Seinfeld)
- The Engagement (book), 2021 book by Sasha Issenberg
- Engagement (sculpture), a series of sculptures by Dennis Oppenheim

== See also ==
- Rules of Engagement (disambiguation)
- Disengagement (disambiguation)
- Engage (disambiguation)
- Engaged (disambiguation)
- Video engagement
