= Engaged (disambiguation) =

An engagement is the period of time between the declaration of acceptance of a marriage proposal and the marriage itself .

Engaged may also refer to:

- Engaged (play), an 1877 play by W. S. Gilbert
- "Engaged" (song), a 2008 song by Alisa Mizuki
- Engaged Buddhism refers to Buddhists who are seeking ways to apply the insights from meditation practice and dharma teachings
- Engaged column, an architectural feature
- Engaged and underage, a 2007 American reality television series on MTV
- Engaged tone, a busy signal
- Engaged Spirituality refers to engaging in the world to transform it in positive ways guided by spiritual beliefs
- Engaged theory is a methodological framework for understanding social complexity
- Engaged hermeneutics, term coined by Andries G. van Aarde

== See also ==
- Engage (disambiguation)
- Engagement (disambiguation)
- Disengage (disambiguation)
- Disengagement (disambiguation)
