= Disengagement =

The term disengagement can refer to:

- Apathy
- Disengagement theory in gerontology
- Moral disengagement
- Religious disengagement
- Social disengagement
- Disengagement (military)
  - Israeli disengagement plan (disambiguation)
    - Israeli disengagement from Gaza
- Superpower disengagement
- Disengagement (film) by director Amos Gitai
- "Disengagement", a song by Insomnium from the album Since the Day It All Came Down
- "Disengagement", a song by Sentenced from the album Shadows of the Past

== See also ==
- Engagement (disambiguation)
- Engage (disambiguation)
- Engaged (disambiguation)
- Disengage (disambiguation)
