= The Engagement (book) =

2021 book by Sasha Issenberg

The Engagement: America's Quarter-Century Struggle Over Same-Sex Marriage
- Cover of the first edition
- Author: Sasha Issenberg
- Language: English
- Subject: History of same-sex marriage in the United States
- Publisher: Pantheon Books
- Publication date: 2021
- Publication place: United States
- Media type: Print
- Pages: 928
- ISBN: 978-1-5247-4874-6

The Engagement: America's Quarter-Century Struggle Over Same-Sex Marriage is a 2021 book about the history of same-sex marriage in the United States by the journalist Sasha Issenberg. Publication was delayed a year by the COVID-19 pandemic. The Engagement received generally positive reviews; critics described it as a detailed, comprehensive account.

== Background and publication history ==
Sasha Issenberg is an American political journalist. As of 2021, he taught political science at the University of California, Los Angeles.

The Engagement was originally slated for publication in June 2020 by Pantheon Books. The COVID-19 pandemic disrupted supply chains for book manufacturing, leading the publisher to defer the book's release first to September 2020, then to June 2021. Random House Audio released an audiobook narrated by Graham Halstead.

== Reception ==
The Engagement was shortlisted for the J. Anthony Lukas Work-in-Progress Award in 2016. It received positive reviews from the historian Michael Henry Adams in The Guardian, the political scientist Daniel Bennett in Christianity Today, Chad Blair in the Honolulu Civil Beat, the LGBT historian Eric Cervini in The New York Times, Rebekah Kati in Library Journal, Kathleen McBroom in Booklist, and Publishers Weekly; and a mixed review from Kirkus Reviews.

Adams described The Engagement as an "engaging, authoritative and impeccably sourced" work of LGBT history. He wrote that the book might teach progressive activists that not only "the most radical policy positions" would prove successful. Bennett reviewed The Engagement alongside William Eskridge and Christopher Riano's Marriage Equality: From Outlaws to In-Laws. He recommended both works to conservative Christians, stating "Even though their authors surely oppose Christian views of marriage, they still offer many insights we can gratefully take into account." He commended Issenberg's focus on the role of individuals.

Blair wrote that The Engagement was "an invaluable reminder" of Hawaii's part in the history of same-sex marriage. He credited Issenberg with "deep attention to detail, a mastery of the facts and a smooth narration" and predicted that the book would draw much attention. Cervini praised the book as "a lively, encyclopedic survey of the struggle for marriage equality". He concluded from Issenberg's account that the same-sex marriage movement was shaped by opposition from conservatives, funded by wealthy gay donors, and predominantly white. He suggested that Issenberg should have engaged with critiques of marriage by Urvashi Vaid, Michael Warner, and Martha Fineman.

Kati described The Engagement as "a comprehensive work of civil rights history that is sure to interest political and legal enthusiasts". She remarked that the chapters "tend to meander". McBroom called the book an "exhaustive, detailed, and authoritative overview", commending Issenberg's "nuanced and insightful reporting". She recommended The Engagement to young adult readers. The Publishers Weekly reviewer commented that the level of detail provided "slows the proceedings somewhat", but praised the book as "a definitive portrait of a key victory in the battle for LGBTQ rights". The Kirkus Reviews reviewer considered The Engagement overdetailed and 200 pages too long; nevertheless, the reviewer recommended it to libraries, bookstores, and "LGBTQ studies completists".
