= Ken Smukler =

American political operative

- Born: September 6, 1960 (age 66)
- Education: University of Pennsylvania; Penn State Dickinson Law

Kenneth Smukler (born September 6, 1960) is a political operative in Pennsylvania, President of Voterlink Data Systems and a former campaign strategist for former US Representative Bob Brady.

== Early life and education ==
Smukler graduated from University of Pennsylvania in 1982 and went on to attend Penn State Dickinson Law. In 1987, Smukler quit his legal career to become the campaign Press Secretary for Philadelphia Mayor, Wilson Goode.

== Career ==
Smukler is best known for his work on the campaigns for Congresswoman Marjorie Margolies-Mezvinsky and Philadelphia City Councilman Rick Mariano.

In 2005, Smukler co-developed a reality television program called Red/Blue where contestants would compete for $1 million to found their own 527 group during the 2006 election cycle. The program was developed by Smukler and True Entertainment.

Smukler's company, Voterlink Data Systems was used to generate content for NBC during the 2004 elections. Voterlink Data Systems was used to create the national vote hotlines 1.866.MYVOTE1 and 1.866.OURVOTE. The same technology was used to support the national voter hotlines 1.866.MYVOTE1 and 1.866.OURVOTE. In 2005, he testified before the Commission on Federal Election Reform about the MYVOTE1 programs.

He was named to the PoliticsPA list of "Pennsylvania's Top Operatives." He was named to the PoliticsPA "Democratic Dream Team" of political operatives.

In 2016, he co-founded the company Votecastr, to track the 2016 Presidential Election in real-time, publishing the results of turnout tracking at Poll Locations online throughout the day.

== Political Corruption and Federal Prosecution ==
On October 24, 2017, Smukler was indicted by federal prosecutors for allegedly making illegal campaign contributions on behalf of Congressman Bob Brady.

On December 3, 2018 Smukler was convicted of conspiracy to defraud the United States and federal campaign finance crimes in 2 congressional campaigns
