= Trevor Cornwell =

American businessman and entrepreneur

Trevor Cornwell (born June 26, 1964) is an American businessman and entrepreneur. He has developed several media and tech businesses and made innovative use of online technologies.

In 2016, he co-founded the company Votecastr to track the 2016 presidential election in real time. The company published the results of turnout tracking at poll locations online throughout the day. However, the platform experienced numerous difficulties during its inception and ultimately proved inaccurate in its execution. Most predictions made by Votecastr fell short of reality.

== Early life and education ==
Cornwell was born in New York City and grew up in Hastings-on-Hudson, New York, where he attended Hastings High School. He began his higher education at American University. He then transferred to Johns Hopkins and from 1982 to 1987, he attended the Johns Hopkins University, where he received a B.A. in International Studies with a concentration on Russian.

== Career ==
=== Early career ===
Cornwell worked as a scheduler for Gary Hart's presidential campaign in 1982-84. He founded the non-profit National Service League, which sought to aid the transition to democracy in Eastern Europe, and ran it from 1990 to 1994. He also founded Central Europe Today, a radio news program broadcast from Budapest, and ran it from 1994 to 1996 during which time he lived in Budapest. He worked in sales and development at America's Promise in 1996-97. At America’s Promise, founded by Colin Powell, Cornwell made $5,000 a month.

=== Skyjet ===
In 1997 Cornwell founded Skyjet, a reservation system for business jets, and served as its president until 2002. The idea for Skyjet came to him while bicycling eight miles to work in Washington, D.C., while he was employed at America's Promise. On that daily bicycle ride, he passed Reagan National Airport, where there were plenty of private planes sitting unused. “And it started to occur to me that there was probably a more efficient way to be able to use those planes rather than just having them sit on the ground for days at a time.”

From 2002-4, Cornwell was vice president for strategy and business development of Business Jet Solutions, Bombardier Aerospace, which purchased Skyjet from him for five million dollars. Skyjet is now owned by Directional Aviation.

Andrew Warner of Mixergy has described Cornwell as “a guy who could barely afford the price of a FedEx envelope to ship out his business plan to investors” but who managed nonetheless to build “a hit charter jet company”, namely Skyjet.

=== Broadband ===
Cornwell founded Broadband Television Network in 2005, and was its president until 2007.

=== appbackr.inc ===
In December 2009, Cornwell founded appbackr.inc, a wholesale market exchange for apps. According to its website, “appbackr’s mission is to index the world’s apps, enabling app users to make informed and inspired decisions, and making apps accessible to everyone through the App Anatomy™ Project.” He is still CEO of that Palo Alto-based firm, which helps publishers and platforms identify the right apps to optimize revenue. appbackr won the PayPal X Developer Challenge; it is an OnMobile 100 Company and an AlwaysOn 250 Company.

=== Other professional activities ===
Cornwell was deputy political director of the U.S. Democratic Senatorial Campaign Committee under the chairmanship of John F. Kerry . He has also been a leading figure in several U.S. political campaigns.

=== Comment about entrepreneurship ===
Asked by Crains to recount a business mistake he had made and learned from, Cornwell recalled his founding of Central Europe Today “right after the Berlin Wall came down,” when “phone lines from Budapest to London were routed through somewhere else.” The problem was that the broadcast was routed through different European cities on different days, with no rhyme or reason, “so we had to be there every step of the way to wake up the operator in whatever country – but that was difficult because we never knew beforehand what country it would be....We had all the big things right, but this small little detail at the core of what we were doing was broken and so everything else broke as a result.” He learned from this experience that “you have to own, obsess and be paranoid about every single step.”
