= Rules of Engagement (disambiguation) =

Rules of engagement are orders to military and security forces.

Rules of Engagement may also refer to:

== Film ==
- Rules of Engagement (film), a 2000 military drama
- Waco: The Rules of Engagement, a 1997 documentary

== Literature ==
- Rules of Engagement (Elizabeth Moon novel)
- Rules of Engagement (Star Trek novel), a novel by Peter Morwood
- Rules of Engagement (Sir John Fielding novel)
- The Rules of Engagement, a novel by Canadian writer Catherine Bush

== Television ==
- Rules of Engagement (TV series)
- "The Rules of Engagement" (Atlantis)
- "Rules of Engagement" (DS9 episode)
- "Rules of Engagement" (Stargate SG-1)
- "The Rules of Engagement" (Will & Grace)
- "Rules of Engagement", an episode of The Dresden Files
- "Rules of Engagement", an episode of When Calls the Heart
- Rules of Engagement, a 1989 British television series on ITV, see 1989 in British television

== Video games ==
- Rules of Engagement (video game), published in 1990
