= Sinai Disengagement Agreements =

Sinai Disengagement Agreements may refer to one of the following:

- Sinai Interim Agreement of 1975
- Israel-Egypt Disengagement Treaty of 1974

These agreements were concluded in the wake of the Yom Kippur War, as a gradual Israeli–Egyptian peace process was launched.

== See also ==
- Camp David Accords
- Egypt–Israel peace treaty
