= Infitah =

Egyptian government policy

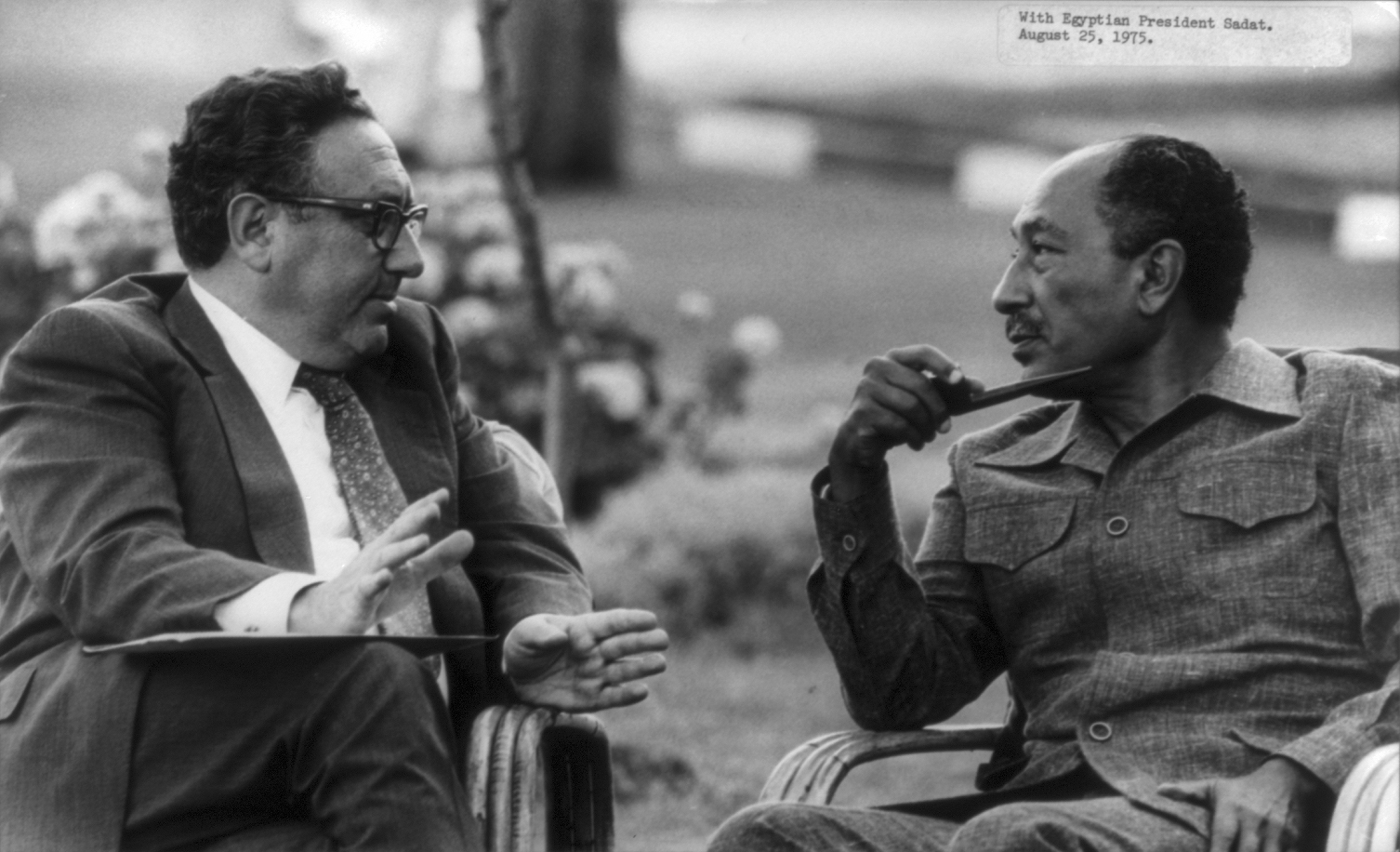
Henry Kissinger with Anwar Sadat, 1975

Infitah (Arabic: انفتاح, romanized: infitāḥ, IPA: [enfeˈtæːħ], lit. 'openness'), or Law 43 of 1974, was Egyptian president Anwar Sadat's policy of "opening the door" to private investment in Egypt in the years after the 1973 October War (Yom Kippur War) with Israel. Infitah was accompanied by a break with longtime ally and aid-giver the USSR—which was replaced by the United States—and by a peace process with Israel, symbolized by Sadat's dramatic flight to Jerusalem in 1977. Infitah encouraged both domestic and foreign investment in the private sector.

The Egyptian Army crossed the Suez canal in the October 1973 Yom Kippur War. Despite the inconclusive outcome, some saw the crossing as a political victory for its initial successes. It gave Sadat the confidence to initiate a major reversal of Gamal Abdel Nasser's policies.

== Overview ==
During the 1950s and 1960s, in the midst of the Cold War, some countries along the Middle East were seeing waves of Arab nationalism in Egypt, Yemen, Syria, and Iraq when aligning with the Eastern Bloc. These governments emphasized ideals like Arab socialism and centered their economic planning on reducing dependencies of foreign exports in favor of nationalizing foreign interests. Moreover, the development of the private sector was to start with the development with the public sector, pushing forwards an economy centered and controlled by the state.

Yet the oil crisis of the 1970s provided a huge influx of capital to oil-producing states along the Gulf, like Kuwait, Saudi Arabia, and Iraq. Roger Owen highlights how total revenues from these states went from $9.3 billion in 1972, the year before the embargo, to $170.7 billion in 1980. Samih Farsoun highlights how these reserves created a dynamic where oil-rich states, in need of leveraging this newly-found capital to invest in a wide variety of projects, would provide capital into oil-poor states to exploit their migrant labor. By the 1970s, Western critics claimed that Egypt's economy, by having a public sector, was a "Soviet-style system" of "inefficiency, suffocating bureaucracy, and waste." Sadat's wars and expenditures caused his government to prioritize drawing in capital rather than sustain social programs and thus, abandon the Eastern bloc to gravitate towards the Western investors and their economic influence.

As a result Sadat wanted to turn Egypt away from its focus on war with Israel. He also believed that capitalist economic policies would build a substantial private sector and that alliance with the United States and the West would lead to prosperity (rakhaa رخاء) and potentially democratic pluralism.

== Shortcomings ==
The implementation of Infitah is generally considered to have been flawed in having abandoned "solidarity with the poor." The government rewarded its cronies and allies (many of whom became dynastic oligarchs) and built a power base loyal to the government with concessions on land, goods and commodities; mandates and contracts to agencies and dealerships. Millions of previously poor Egyptians who had been lifted out of poverty and into the middle class under the Nasser government through public educationahaa found jobs as doctors, engineers, teachers, lawyers, journalists, and civil servants for the government or parastatals, were left stuck in an "increasingly marginalized, stagnant and low-paying public sector," under Infitah. Infitah was a shock to the Nasser-era middle class, reversing the socialist principles of Nasserism, a reversal of policies of free education, social equality, abolition of feudalism, nationalization of land and industry, and progressive taxation. At the same time the public sector continued to dominate the economy. The proportion of the population working for the state grew from 3.8% at the height of the Nasserite era to 10% (about 35% of the country's entire labor force) after the full thrust of Infitah in the early 1980s. Despite the influx of foreign private investment and austerity measures, the "state's contribution to the formation of investment capital" (72%), barely changed from the mid-1960s to the end of the 1970s.

In 1977, negative public reaction to Infitah policies led to massive spontaneous riots involving hundreds of thousands of Egyptians when the state announced that it was retiring subsidies on basic foodstuffs. On 6 October 1981, Sadat was assassinated during a military parade in Cairo.

== See also ==
- Anwar Sadat
- Arab socialism
- Gamal Abdel Nasser
- History of modern Egypt
- Liberalization
- Nasserism
- Perestroika
- Infiraj
- Privatization
- Yom Kippur War
- Reform and opening up
- New Economic Policy
