= Abydos boats =

Archaeological site in Egypt

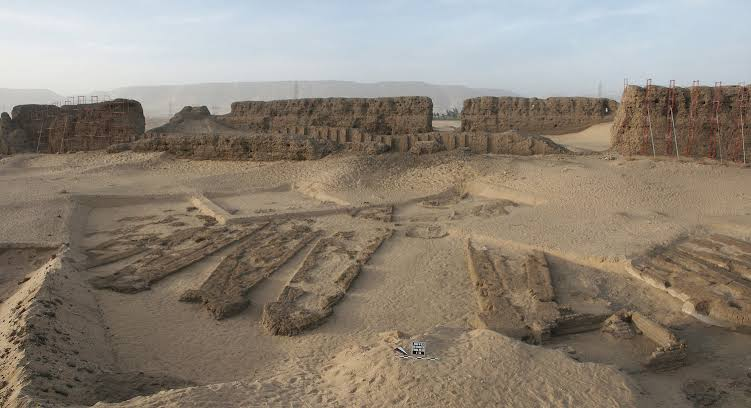
The brick-lined pits in which the Abydos boats were buried

The Abydos boats are the remnants of a group of ancient royal Egyptian ceremonial boats found at an archaeological site in Abydos, Egypt. Discovered in 1991, excavation of the Abydos boats began in 2000 at which time fourteen boats were identified. They are located alongside the massive mudbrick structure known as Shunet El Zebib, attributed to the 2nd Dynasty Pharaoh Khasekhemwy. Shunet El Zebib is one of several such "enclosure wall" constructions at this site dating back to the Early Dynastic Period, and is located nearly one mile from the royal cemetery of Umm El Qa'ab.

== Discovery ==
The University of Pennsylvania Museum and Yale University Expedition carried out the excavation of the Abydos boats. Lines of mudbrick uncovered by blowing sand were first noticed in 1988 at a site a mile away from the royal tombs in Abydos. These brick remains were first thought to be just walls. However, it was later determined that they were the boundaries for more than a dozen ship burials from an early dynasty. Each ship grave had its own brick boundary walls. The outline of each grave was in the shape of a boat, and the surface of each was covered with mud plaster and whitewash. Small boulders at the prow or stern of each grave represented anchors. Because of the fragility of the boat remains, almost no excavation was done initially as the situation had to be carefully studied for future conservation.

== Design and construction ==
Boat no. 10, which was slowly appearing due to apparent soil erosion, was the only boat that was initially investigated. For five days, archaeologists carefully examined the midsection of the ship. They uncovered wooden planks, disintegrated rope, and reed bundles. Wood-eating ants had reduced much of the ship's hull to frass (ant excrement), but the frass had retained the shape of the original hull. The midsection of this boat revealed the construction methods used and confirmed the oldest ‘planked’ constructed boat yet discovered. The boat's construction revealed it had been constructed from the outside in, as there was no internal frame. Averaging 75 ft long and 7–10 ft wide at their greatest width, these boats were only about two feet deep, with narrow prows and sterns. Several boats were white-plastered, as were the Abydos tombs, and no. 10 was painted yellow.

Seams between planks were filled with reed bundles, reeds also covered the floor of each Abydos boat. Without internal framing, some of these boats became twisted, as was unavoidable without an internal skeleton for support when out of the water. The wood of the Abydos boats was local Tamarix – tamarisk, salt cedar – not cedar from Lebanon which was used for Khufu’s Solar Barque and favored for shipbuilding in Egypt in later dynasties.

Lebanon cedar was used for the poles and beams of the Umm el-Qa'ab tombs and had already been imported earlier; pigment residues hinted at bright colors. The wood planks were painted yellow on their outside and traces of white pigment have also been found. “A part of the mud brick casing suggests that there could have been a support for poles/pennants on top of the boats, as in the boats depicted on pottery or atop the archaic shrines onto some mace heads/palettes and in the HK loc. 29A cultural center.” This technology for ship construction persisted in Egypt for more than one thousand years and the standardization of this earliest phase of plank boat construction in Egypt is striking.

== Ritual significance ==
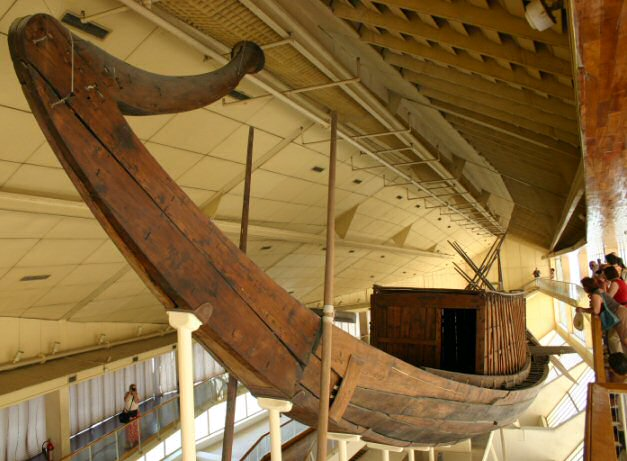
Solar Bark, Cheops (Kufu), ca. 2500 BC

The Abydos boats were found in boat graves with their prows pointed towards the Nile. Experts consider them to have been the royal boats intended for the pharaoh in the afterlife. Umm el-Qa'ab is a royal necropolis that is about one mile from the Abydos boat graves where early pharaohs were entombed.

The Abydos boats are the predecessors of the great solar boats of later dynasties upon which the pharaoh joined the sun god Ra and together journeyed down the sacred Nile during the day. They would have had many of the important attributes and metaphors that were attached to the solar barques of later dynasties, and indeed perhaps should be called solar boats of an earlier design. The Khufu ship, built for the Pharaoh Khufu – Cheops – ca. 2500 BC., is usually identified as the earliest solar barque. It was buried in a pit at the foot of the Great Pyramid at Giza.

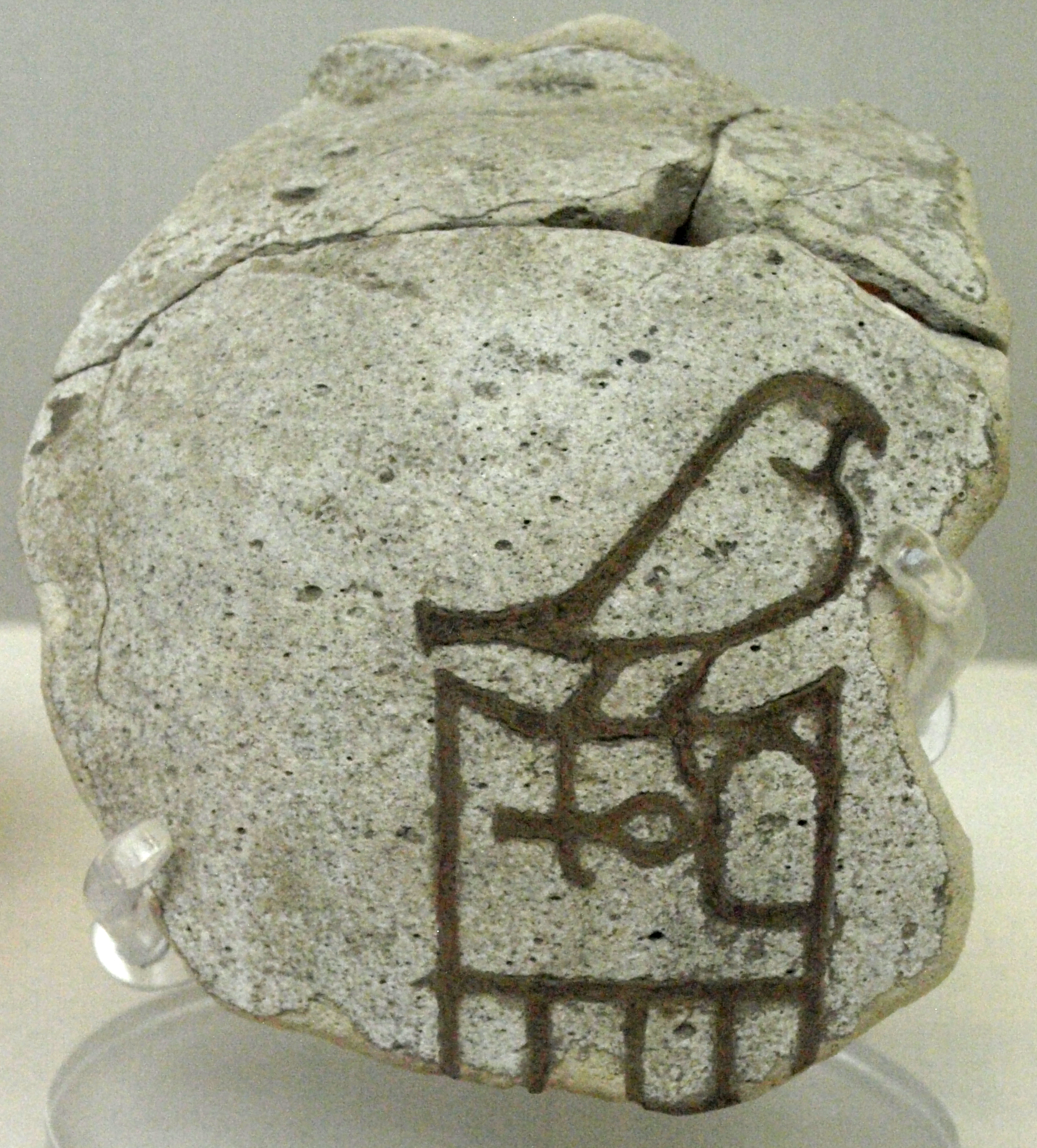
Glazed fragment faience vessel / pharaoh Aha, early 1st Dynasty, ca. 3000 BC

The Abydos boat graves were adjacent to a massive funerary enclosure for the late Dynasty II (ca. 2675 B.C.) Pharaoh Khasekhemwy at Abydos which is eight miles from the Nile. Umm el-Qa'ab is a royal necropolis at Abydos where early pharaohs were entombed. However, these boat graves were established earlier than late in Dynasty II, perhaps for the afterlife journeys of Hor-Aha, the first king (ca. 2920–2770) of the First Dynasty of Egypt, or Pharaoh Djer also of Dynasty I. Two more recently located mortuary discoveries have been identified as those of King Aha, who may have been the son of the famous King Narmer, to whom the first unification of Upper and Lower Egypt is often attributed.

== First Dynasty ships ==
The Abydos boats are not the only find of First Dynasty ships. Nineteen boat burials were found at Helwan, but only four of these finds were published. Six boat graves were found at Saqqara by Walter Bryan Emery and four of these finds were published. Finally two full-sized model boats made out of clay are known from Abu Roash Hill. Helwan (a suburb of Cairo on eastern side of Nile) contain a huge cemetery field 20 km south of Cairo adjoining Saqqara in which at least 10,000 tombs have been cataloged. The size of Helwan indicates a very large population for Early Dynastic Memphis. Almost all the tombs date from Dynasty 0 through the Third Dynasty. There are 19 elite tombs where 1st Dynasty funeral boat burials have been discovered that resemble those at Abydos, but little published information is available.

== See also ==
- Ancient Egyptian solar ships
- Ancient Egyptian technology
- Dahshur boats
- Giza Solar boat museum
- Khufu ship
- Dover Bronze Age Boat
- Sewn boat
- Ships preserved in museums
- Solar barge
