= Solar boat =

Solar boat may refer to:

- A mythological boat used by a solar deity
  - Solar barque, an Egyptian mythological boat used by Ra
- An electric boat powered by solar energy
