= Giza Solar boat museum =

Former museum in Giza, Egypt

Coordinates: 29°58′41″N 31°08′04″E

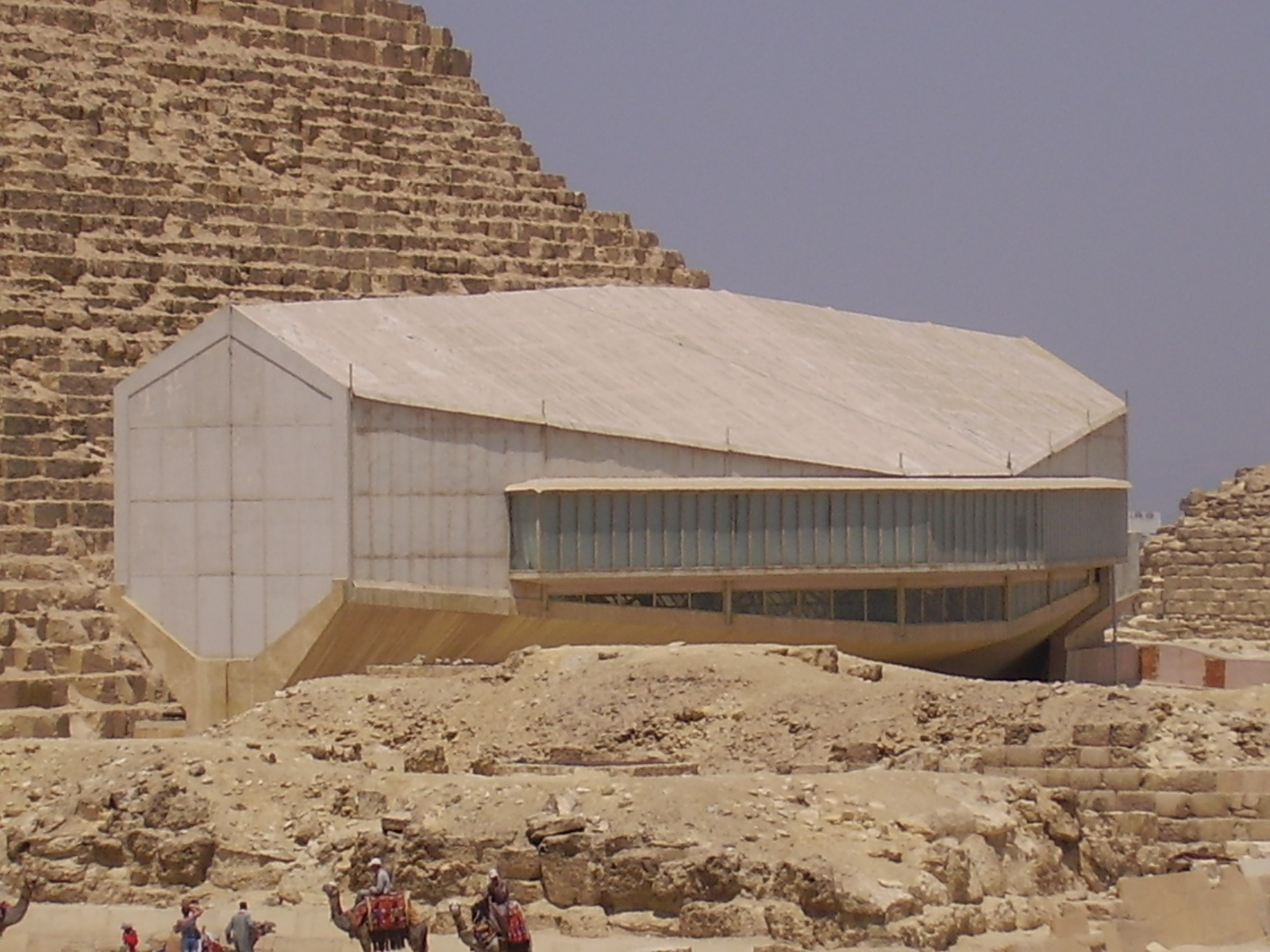

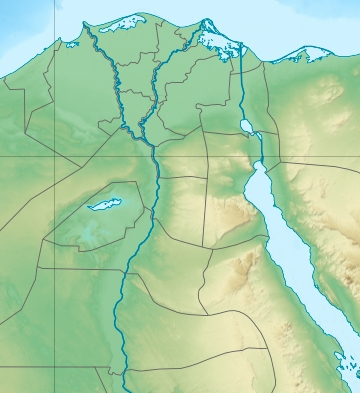
- Location within Northern Egypt
- Established: 1982
- Dissolved: 2021

The Giza Solar boat museum was dedicated to display the reconstructed Khufu ship, a solar barque of pharaoh Khufu. It was constructed between 1961 and 1982, just a few meters from where the Khufu ship was found, on the southern side of the Great Pyramid, on the Giza Plateau in Egypt

It was equipped with modern techniques and technologies to preserve the solar boat. The construction enabled viewing the boat from three different levels. On the ground floor, one could view the bottom of the boat.

The museum was dismantled after the ship was relocated to the Grand Egyptian Museum in August 2021.

== Khufu Ship ==
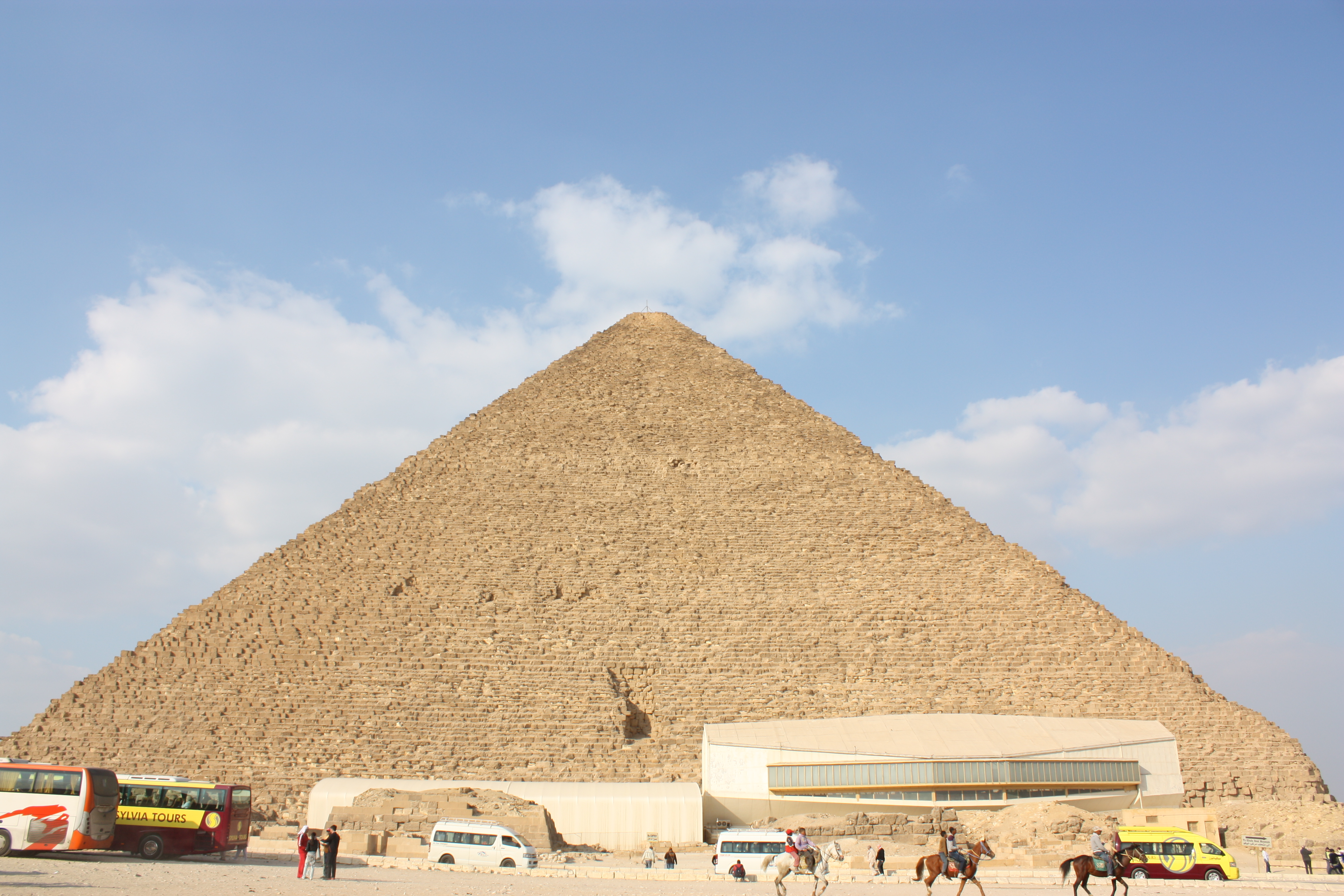
Great Pyramid of Giza from south showing the Solar boat museum

When the Egyptian antiquities inspector responsible for the area of Giza, Mohamed Zaky Nour, the civil engineer who was in charge of cleaning up the area of the Pyramids of Giza, Kamal el Malakh, and the supervisor of the cleaning process of the area, Doctor Abdel Men'em Aboubakr were finishing their work at the pyramids, they found what seemed to be a wall made out of limestone. After much digging, they reached the bottom of the wall and found 42 pieces of rock that were divided into two groups to protect them from damage. On 26 May 1954, a hole was pierced into the chamber where pieces of a solar barque were buried, and everybody who was there smelled the distinctive scent of cedar wood. The ship had been disassembled for funeral rites into 1224 small pieces before being buried. It was fully re-assembled in 1968.

== Contents ==
- Reassembled Khufu ship (now in the Grand Egyptian Museum)
- A maquette Khufu Solar ship
- Photos of the discovery and reassembling of the ship

== Gallery ==
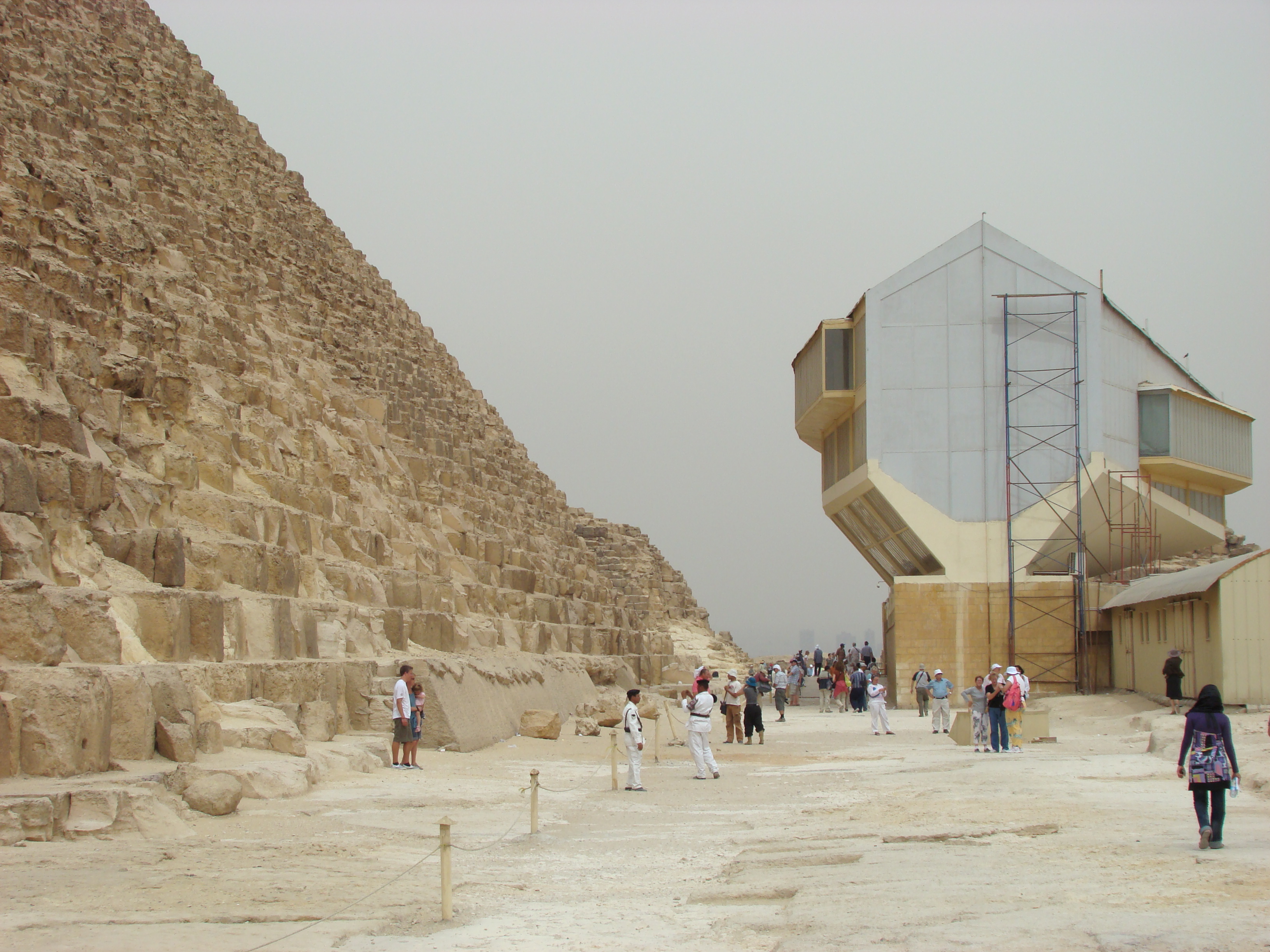
Khufu solar ship museum outdoors view

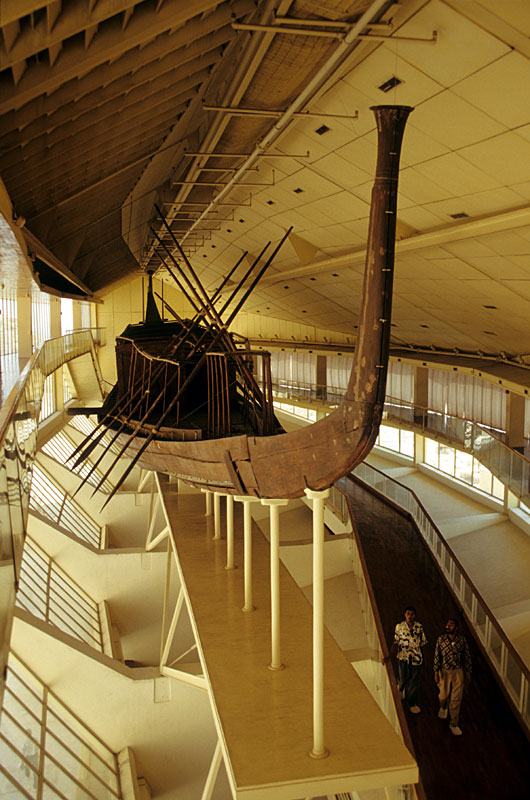
Boat museum, Giza Pyramids Plateau, Egypt

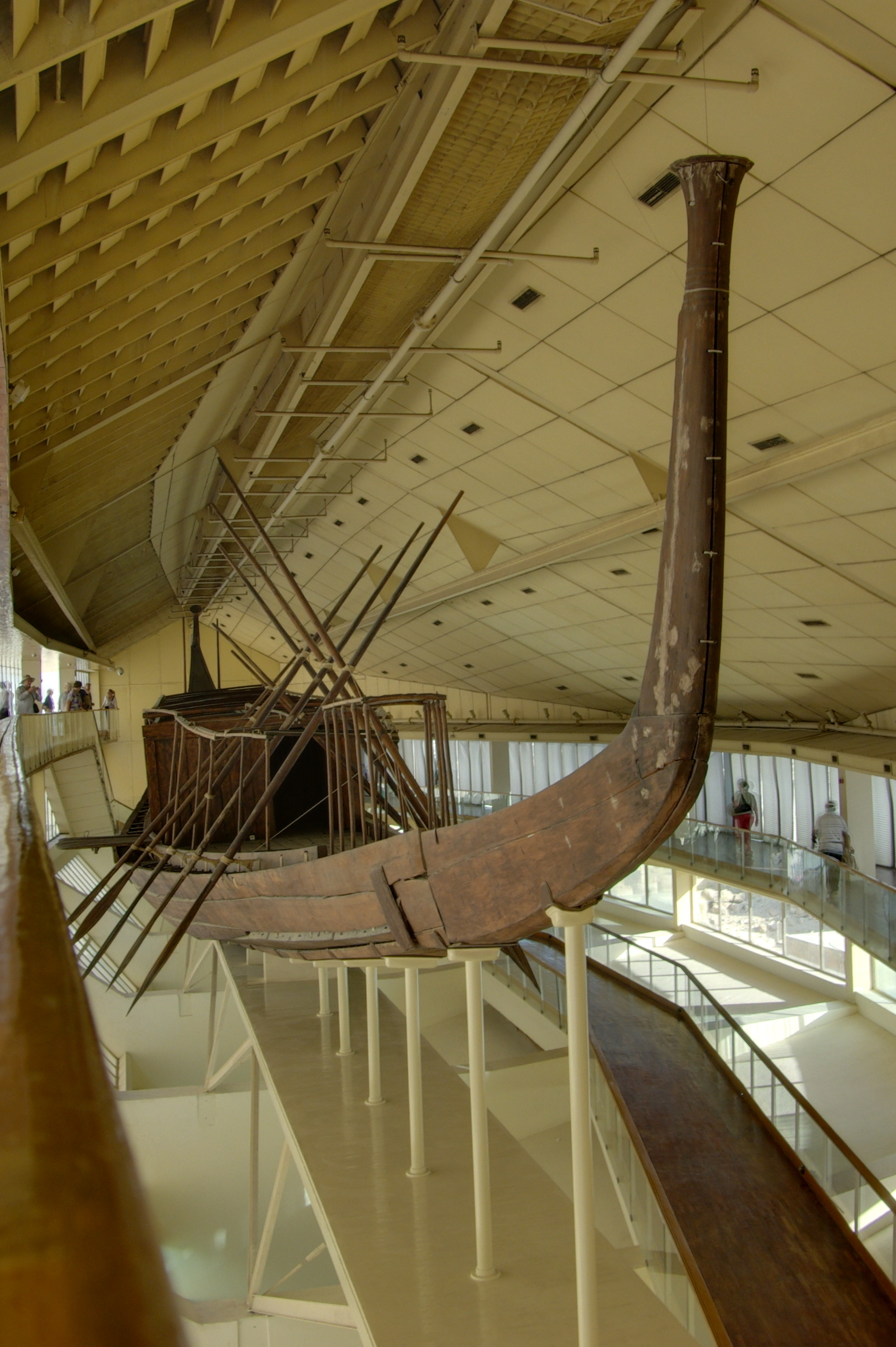
Khufu Solar ship in the museum

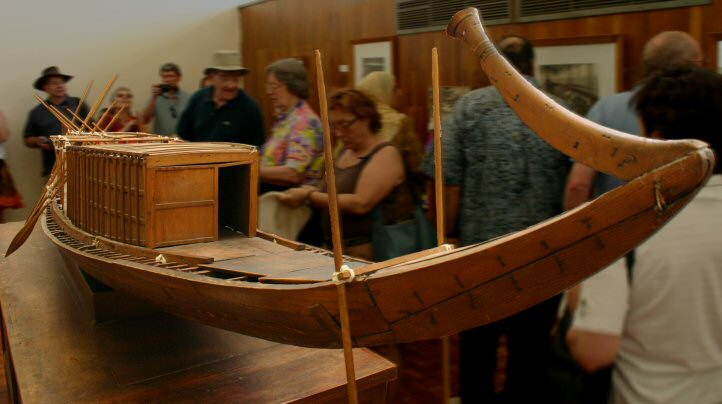
Khufu Solar ship maquette

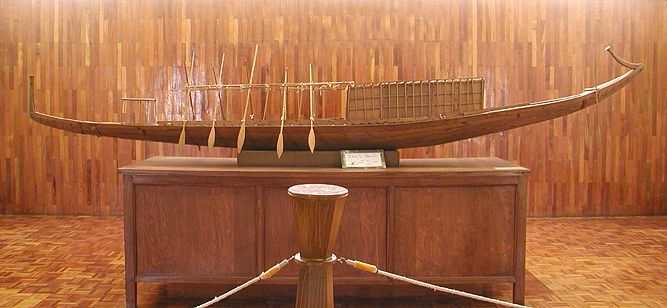
A modern model of the Solar Barge displayed in the museum

== See also ==
- Ancient Egyptian solar ships
- Abydos boats
- Ancient Egyptian technology
- Ships preserved in museums
