= Ancient Egyptian royal ships =

Ancient Egyptian ships

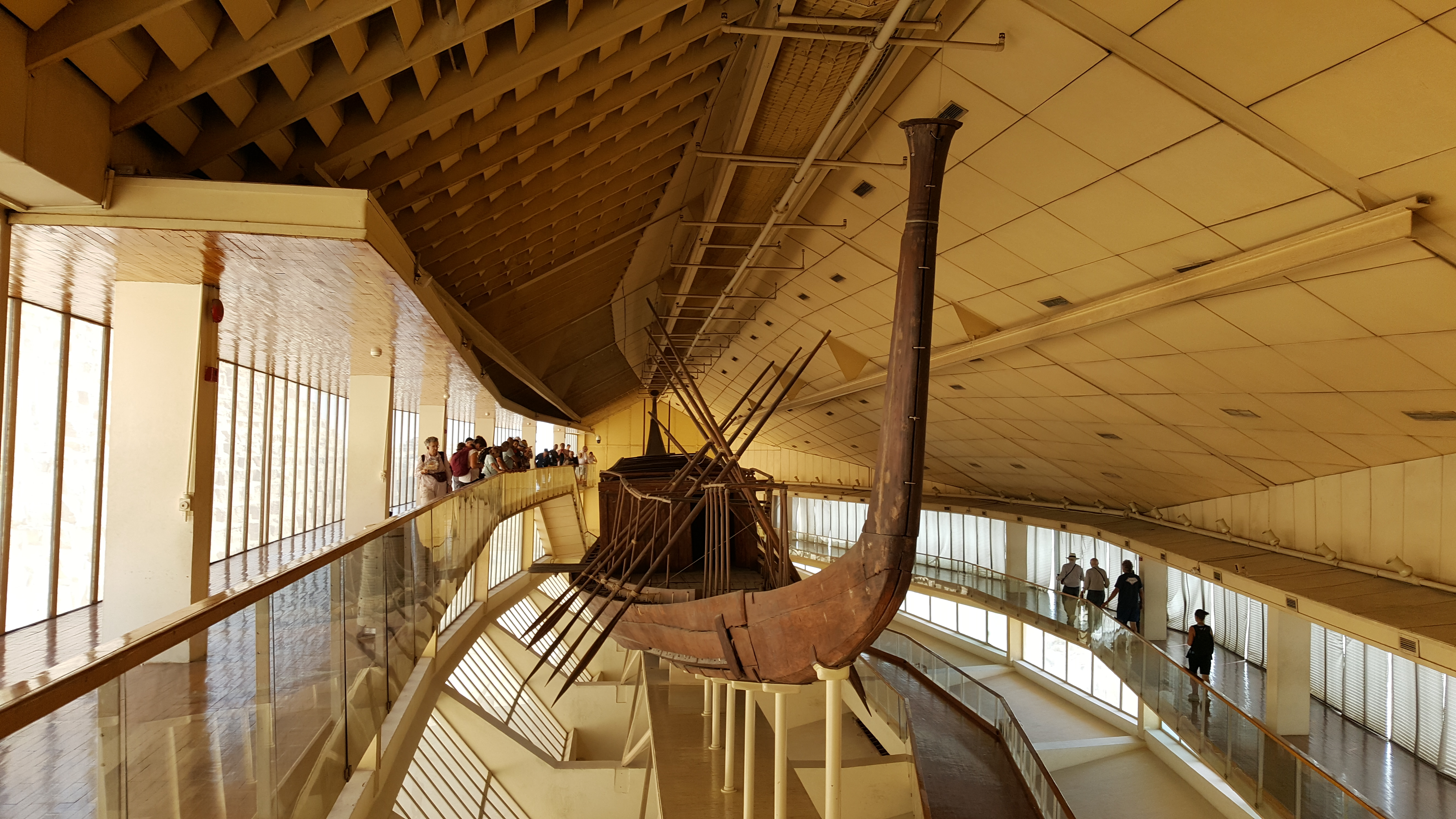
The Khufu ship, an intact full-size vessel that was sealed into a pit in the Giza pyramid complex at the foot of the Great Pyramid of Giza around 2500 BC. Picture shows the original on display in the Giza Solar boat museum.

Several ancient Egyptian solar ships and boat pits were found in many ancient Egyptian sites. The most famous is the Khufu ship, which is now preserved in the Grand Egyptian Museum. The full-sized ships or boats were buried near ancient Egyptian pyramids or temples at many sites. The history and function of the ships are not precisely known. They are most commonly created as a "solar barge", a ritual vessel to carry the resurrected king with the sun god Ra across the heavens. This is a common theme in the Pyramid Texts, and these buried boats might be a real-life equivalent of solar barges. Similarly, another explanation behind these boats is that they were built for past kings to carry them to the afterlife. Because of these ships' association with the sun, they are often found in an east-west orientation in order to follow the path of the sun.

Many of these boats are found in either a planked form or as a boat-like structure. For example, many of the well-known solar ships like the Khufu ship are found as an intact boat or as boat remains. However, other evidence of ancient Egyptian boats comes from what are known as "boat pits" or "boat graves", which are pits that are in the shape of a boat. These boat pits are often found near pyramids or tombs and are thus assumed to be associated with solar ships. Some examples of these include Niuserre's solar ship and the Djedefre solar ship.

== Comparative table of solar ships ==
Name of ship(s)	Dating	Number	Discovery site	Current site	Length & width	Owner	Discovery date	Current status	Coordinates
Khufu First Solar ship	c. 2566 BC	1	South of Khufu pyramid, Giza	Grand Egyptian Museum, Giza	43.6 m (143 ft) long & 5.9 m (19 ft) wide	King Khufu	1954 by Kamal el-Mallakh	Ship pit preserved containing the wood of a ship, which was later reconstructed	29°58′41″N 31°08′04″E
Khufu Second Solar ship	c. 2566 BC	1	South of Khufu pyramid, Giza	2nd Solar Ship pit, Khufu pyramid complex, Giza	N/A	King Khufu	1954 by Kamal el-Mallakh & 2012	Ship pit preserved containing wood of ship to be reconstructed	29°58′41″N 31°08′04″E
Hetepheres I Solar Ship	c. 2589–2566 BC	1	Pyramid of Hetepheres (GIa), Khufu pyramid complex, Giza	N/A	N/A	Queen Hetepheres I	N/A	Boat pit preserved	29°58′41″N 31°08′04″E
The Ka Solar Ship	c. 2566 BC	1	Pyramid of the Ka, Khufu pyramid complex, Giza	N/A	N/A	King Khufu	1954	Boat pit preserved	29°58′41″N 31°08′04″E
Other Khufu Solar ship	c. 2566 BC	3	East of Khufu pyramid, Giza	N/A	N/A	King Khufu	N/A	Ship pits preserved	29°58′41″N 31°08′04″E
Khentkaus I Solar ship	c. 2445 BC	2	Pyramid of Khentkawes in Giza (LG 100), Giza	N/A	N/A	Queen Khentkaus I	1906 by Borchardt	Ship pits preserved	29°58′41″N 31°08′04″E
Khafre Solar Ships	c. 2570 BC	7	5 around the Upper temple: 2 on north side & 3 on south; 2 in tunnels of Lower temple; Khafre pyramid complex, Giza	N/A	N/A	King Khafre	1837 by John Perring ?	Ship pits preserved	29°58′34″N 31°07′51″E
Nyuserre Ini Solar ship	c. 2421 BC	1	Outside the temple on the south-east corner of Niuserre Sun Temple, Abo Gorab, Abusir	Boat pit preserved	N/A	King Nyuserre Ini	1905	Boat pit preserved	29°54′N 31°12′E
Den Solar ship	c. 2935 BC	2	Northern area of Mastaba number six, Abu Rawash	National Museum of Egyptian Civilization	6 m (20 ft) long and 1.5 m (4 ft 11 in) wide	King Den	2012	Preserved	30°01′55″N 31°04′30″E
Djedefre Solar Ship	c. 2575 BC	1	East side of the pyramid complex of Djedefre, Abu Rawash	Louvre, France	35 m (115 ft) long & ? m wide	King Djedefre, son of Khufu	1901	Boat pit preserved, beautiful heads carved into the likeness of Djedefre were found here	30°01′55″N 31°04′30″E
Neferirkare Solar Ships	c. 2483–2465 BC	2	North & South sides of Neferirkare pyramid, Abusir	Mentioned in a papyrus	N/A	King Neferirkare Kakai	1904? by M. Verner	Only dust remains boat pits preserved	29°54′N 31°12′E
Neferefre Solar Ships	c. 2445 BC	5	Funerary temple of Neferefre, Abu Sir	N/A	N/A	King Neferefre	N/A	Boat pits preserved	29°54′N 31°12′E
Ptahshepses Solar Ships	c. 2445–2421 BC	2	Southern part of the complex of the vizier Ptahshepses, Abu Sir	N/A	N/A	Ptahshepses	N/A	Boat pits preserved	29°54′N 31°12′E
Hor-Aha Solar ships	c. 2775 BC	14	Between the Shunet ez-Zabib and the Western Mastaba, Abydos	N/A	18–27 m (59–89 ft) long & 2.5 m (8 ft 2 in) wide	King Hor-Aha	1991	Fragile boat remains	26°11′06″N 31°55′08″E
Khasekhemwy Solar Ships	c. 2675 BC	12	Umm el Qa'ab, Abydos	N/A	25 m (82 ft) long & 2.5 m-wide (8.2 ft) & 0.5 m (1 ft 8 in) deep	Khasekhemwy	2000 by D O'Connor	Fragile boat remains	26°11′06″N 31°55′08″E
Senusret III Solar ships	c. 1839 BC	6	Near the pyramid of Senusret III, Dashur	One in Carnegie Museum of Natural History in Pittsburgh, USA and one in the Field Museum of Natural History in Chicago, USA; two in The Sharm El-Sheikh Museum & 2 were lost?	10–18 m (33–59 ft) long & 5.9 m (19 ft) wide	King Senusret III	1893 Jacques de Morgan	Well preserved	29.80°N 31.24°E
Amenemhat III Solar ship	c. 1814 BC	1	South perimeter of Amenemhat III pyramid, Dashur	Decomposed	15 m (49 ft) long & 5.7 m-wide (19 ft)	King Amenemhat III	?	Ship pit preserved	29.80°N 31.24°E
Saqqarah First dynasty Solar boats	c. 3100–2890 BC	3	Tomb S 3357, Saqqara	N/A	N/A	First Dynasty of Egypt kings	1957 by W. Emory	Ship pits preserved	29.871264°N 31.216381°E
Kagemni Solar ships	c. 2345 – 2333 BC	2	Tomb of the vizier Kagemni, Saqqara	N/A	N/A	Vizier Kagemni	N/A	Ship pits preserved	29.871264°N 31.216381°E
Unas Solar Ship	c. 2345 BC	2	150 meter from the funeral Temple of Unas Pyramid, Saqqara	N/A	44 m long & ? m wide	King Unas	?	Ship pits preserved	29.871264°N 31.216381°E
Tarkhan Solar ship	c. 3100–2890 BC	?	Tarkhan (Egypt) or Kafr Ammar	N/A	N/A	First Dynasty of Egypt kings?	1913 by Flinders Petrie	N/A	29.500°N 31.225°E
Helwan Solar ships	c. 3100–2890 BC	5	Tombs 762 H5, 649 H5, 1502 H2 and 680 H5), Helwan	N/A	N/A	First Dynasty of Egypt kings?	1940s by Z Saad	N/A	29°58′41″N 31°08′04″E
Senusert I Solar Ship	c. 1926 BC	1?	Pyramid of Senusret I, Lisht	N/A	N/A	King Senusret I	?	40 timbers preserved	29°34′13″N 31°13′52″E
Amenemhat I Solar ship	c. 1962 BC	1	Pyramid of Amenemhat I, Lisht	N/A	N/A	King Amenemhat I	?	N/A	29°34′13″N 31°13′52″E

== Giza Necropolis ==
=== Khufu ===
A total of seven boat pits have been located within the area surrounding the Great Pyramid. Whereas five of them are directly near the Great Pyramid, the other two are near the pyramid of Hetepheres and the pyramid of Ka, respectively.

==== Khufu First Solar ship ====
The Khufu ship is an intact full-size vessel from ancient Egypt that was sealed into a pit in the Giza pyramid complex at the foot of the Great Pyramid of Giza around 2500 BC. It was thus identified as the world's oldest intact ship and has been described as "a masterpiece of woodcraft" that could sail today if put into water. The Khufu ship is one of the oldest, largest, and best-preserved vessels from antiquity. It measures 43.6 m (143 ft) long and 5.9 m (19 ft) wide.

The ship was one of two rediscovered in 1954 by Kamal el-Mallakh – undisturbed since it was sealed into a pit carved out of the Giza bedrock. It was excavated in pieces and took years for the boat to be reassembled, primarily by the Egyptian Department of Antiquities' chief restorer, Ahmed Youssef Moustafa, who learned ancient Egyptian boat-building practices for the project.

The ship was housed in the Giza Solar Boat Museum, which was created specifically for the ship and was meant to aid its preservation. However, the Khufu ship was moved to the Grand Egyptian Museum in August 2021.

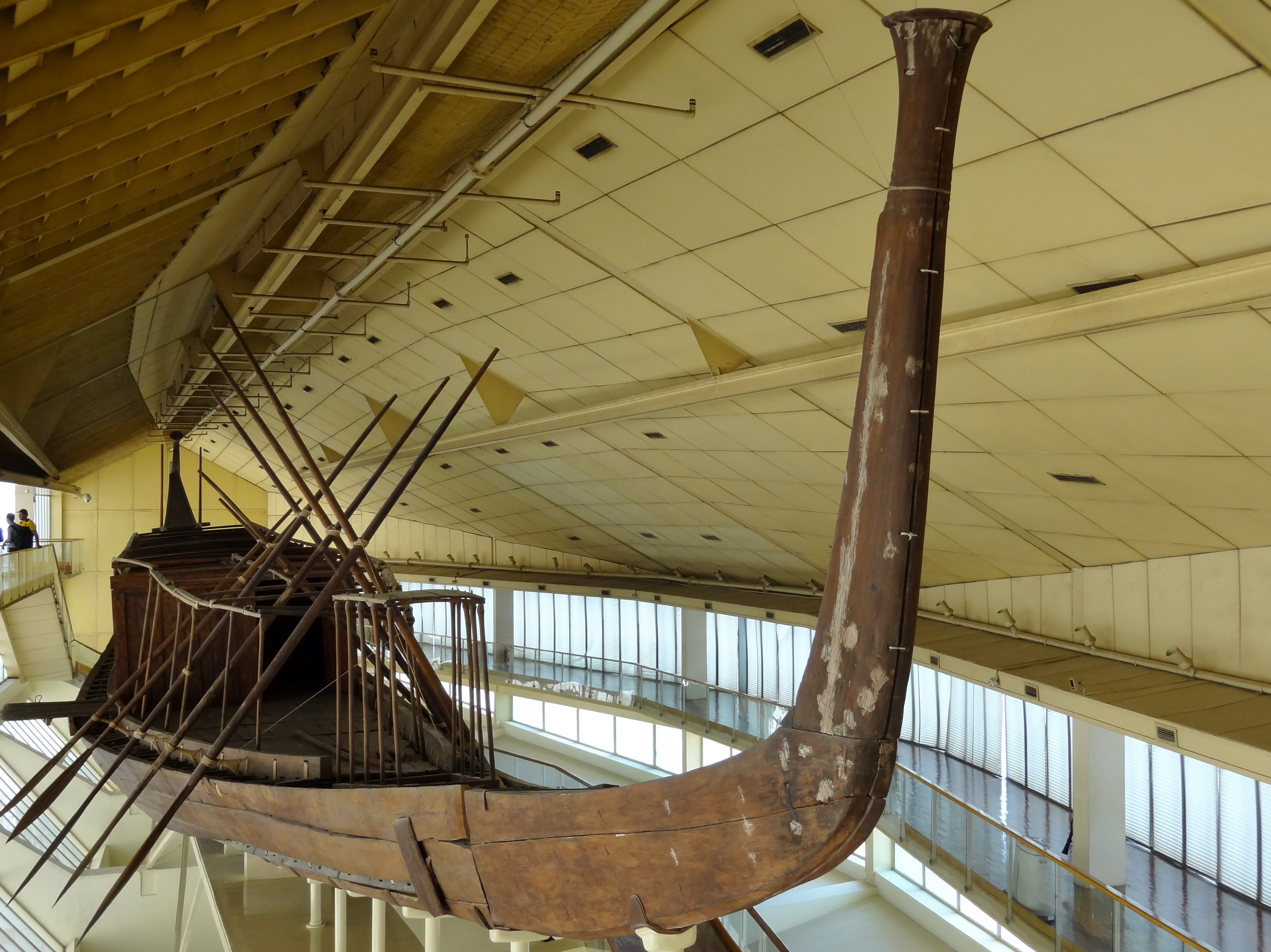
The reconstructed "solar barge" of Khufu

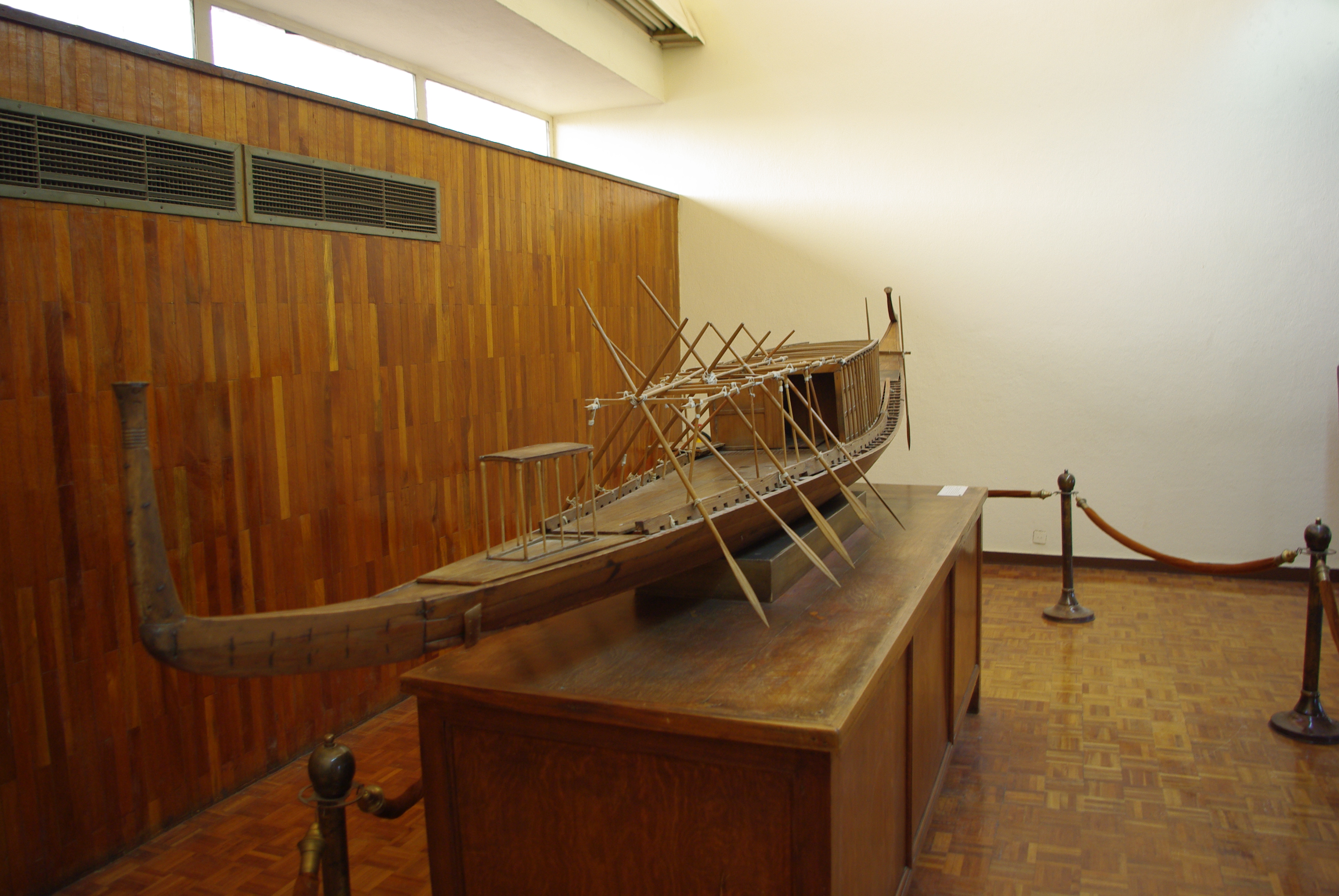
Model of the solar barge, from the Giza Solar Boat Museum

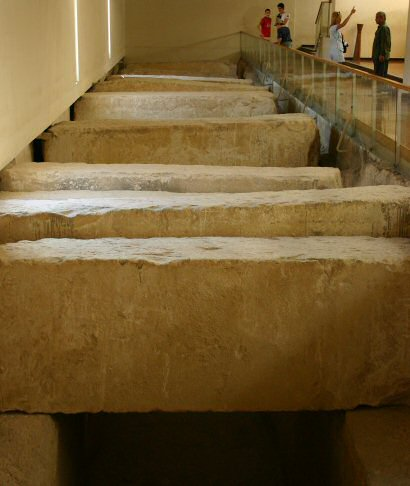
Picture of the discovery place of the Khufu First Solar ship inside the Giza Solar Boat Museum

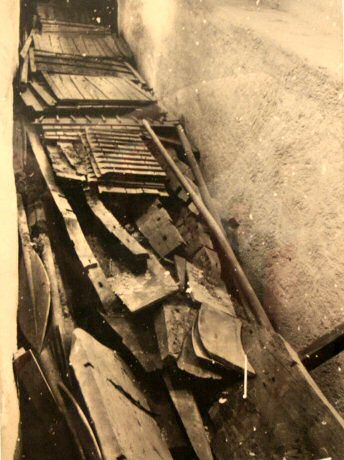
Solar boat of Khufu when it was discovered in 1954

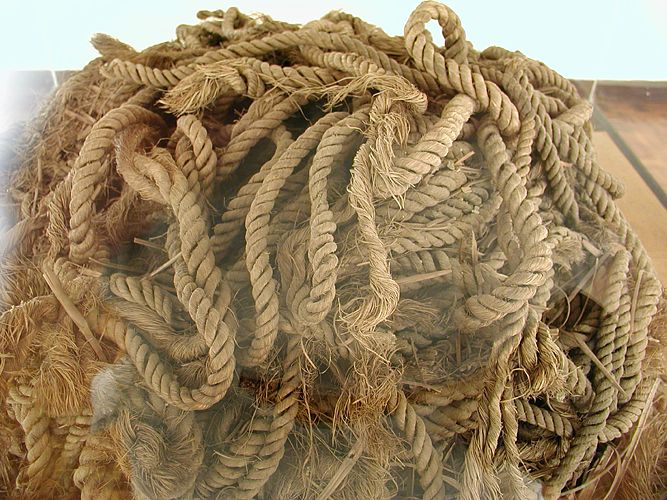
Original cord discovered with the Khufu First Solar ship

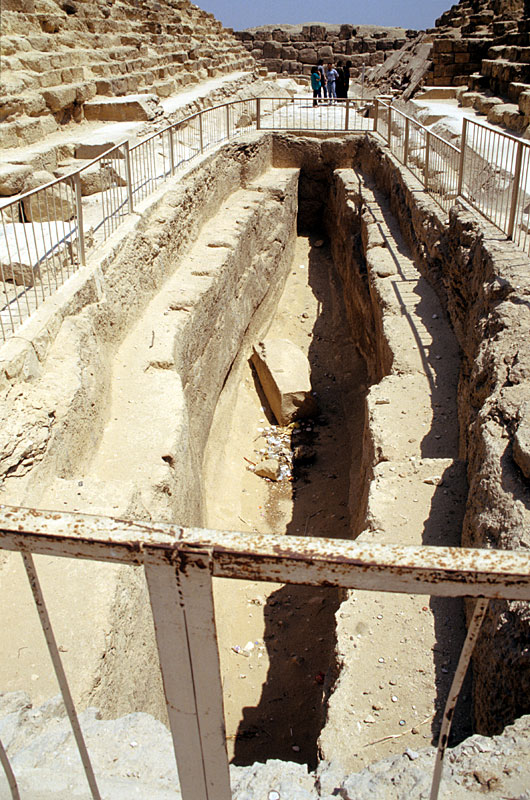
A solar boat pit near the Great Pyramids

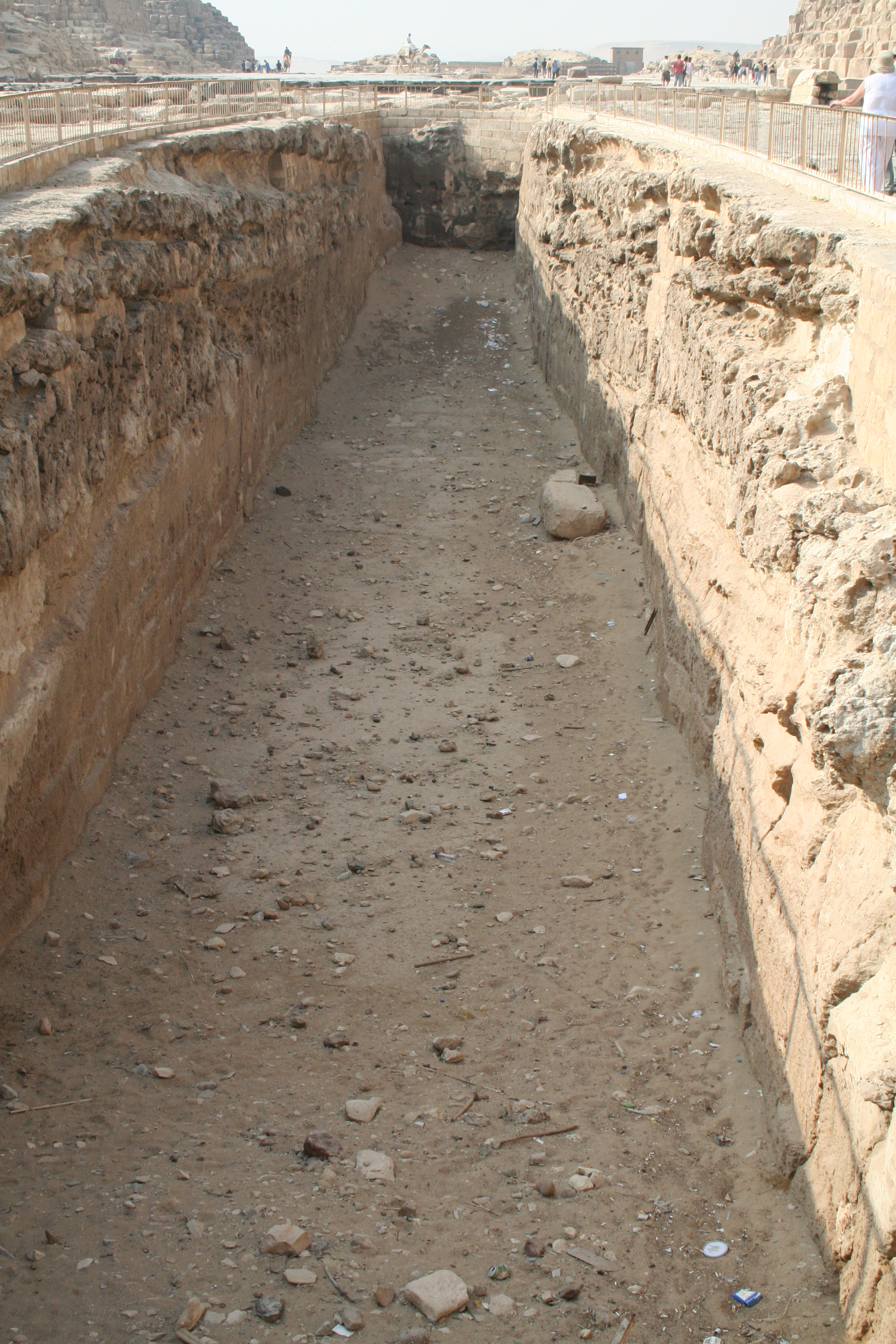
One of the boat pits on the east side of the Great Pyramid of Giza

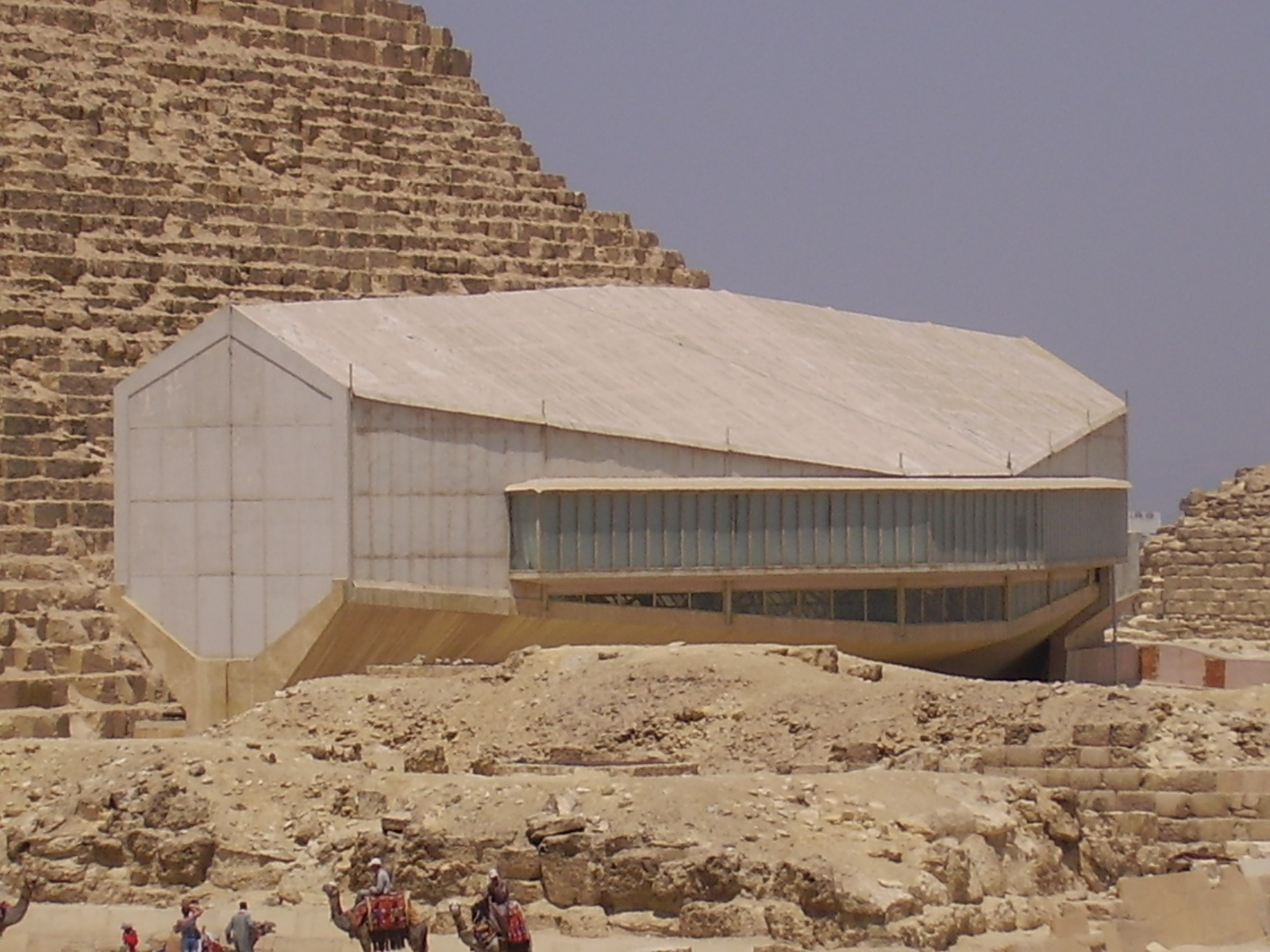
The Giza Solar Boat Museum

==== Khufu Second Solar ship ====
Along with the First Khufu Solar ship, a second one was discovered nearby. However, there wasn't much effort to examine it until 1987. In 1987, researchers from the Antiquities Authority and the American Geographical Society created a project meant to photograph the inside of the second boat pit without harming its contents. They elected to hire Bob Morse, a drilling engineering specialist, to design the drill to prevent harmful elements, like humidity, from entering the boat pit.

The excavation of the second solar boat of Khufu was started in 1992 as a joint effort between an Egyptian-Japanese team. It was finished in 2021. The ship will be reconstructed and displayed in the Grand Egyptian Museum, which was created to house the first solar boat of Khufu and the second solar boat of Khufu. Sakuji Yoshimura, a Waseda University professor who is leading the restoration project with Egypt's Antiquities Council, said that scientists discovered that one of the cover stones of the boat pit is inscribed with Khufu's name.

==== Hetepheres Solar ship ====
Associated with and found near the Pyramid of Hetepheres I.

==== Ka Solar Ship ====
Associated with and found near the Pyramid of Ka.

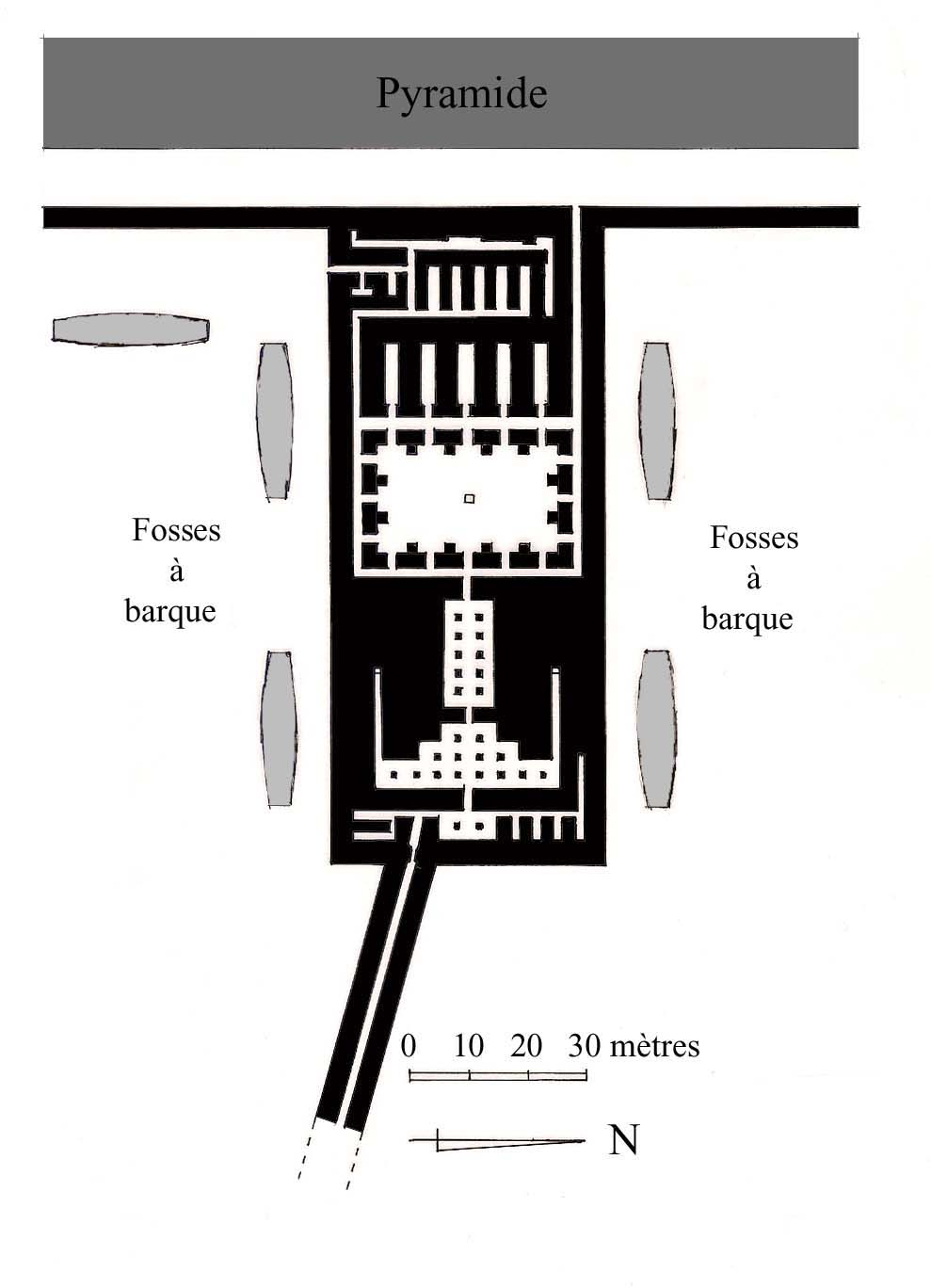
Khafre Solar boat pits lie on the side of Khafre's pyramid.

=== Khafre Solar ships ===
Khafre's pyramid has five pits that once contained funeral boats, with a deep cleft in a rock suggesting the possibility of an unfinished sixth boat. These boats are all made of stone. There are two boats on the north side of the pyramid and two boats on the south side. Both rows of the boats are oriented east-west. The western boat of the two boats in the north is covered by white limestone and a cabin. These characteristics are shared by the western boat of the two boats in the south. These characteristics suggest that these two boats were the Night-boats of Ra, which are the mythological boats that Ra would have embarked on during the nighttime. In contrast, the other two boats lacked a cabin, and are thus categorized as Solar-boats of Ra. The two solar boats, known as the Northern-Day Boat and the Southern-Day Boat, lack the sharply incurved stern post that is popular in later iterations of solar boats and pictures like the Pyramid Texts and Palermo stone. The fifth boat is located south of the pyramid, but is perpendicular to the pyramid instead of parallel.

==== The Southern-Night Boat ====
The Southern-Night Boat is very well preserved. It contains a large cabin and all of the roofing slabs were intact when it was discovered. The boat also carried in it part of a limestone sphinx, two plates of redware, and a green basalt roller which was used for moving heavy objects. It measures 25 meters long, 3.7 meters wide, and 7.5 meters deep.

==== The Southern-Day Boat ====
The Southern-Day Boat lies just 11 meters away from the Southern-Night Boat and resembles it very closely, though it lacks a cabin and is smaller. The boat carried a lot of fragments of royal statues of diorite and alabaster. It measures 22 meters long, 3.9 meters wide, and 6 meters deep.

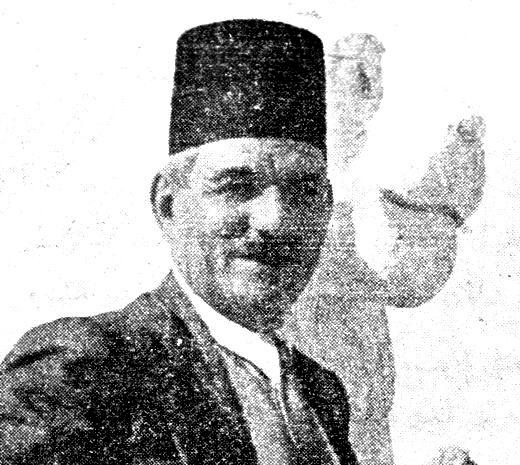
An image of Egyptian Egyptologist Selim Hassan

==== The Northern-Night Boat ====
The Northern-Night boat is much like the Southern-Night Boat in that it was covered with slabs of limestone, though the cabin that is present is closer to the stern than its Southern counterpart. It contained a large drop-shaped bead of blue faience, a redware incense burner, a redware flask, an alabaster model vase, a shell, some blocks of dressed limestone, a fragment of an alabaster plate, a large redware pot, and ox bones. The ship measures 27.5 meters long, 3.6 meters wide, and 7 meters deep.

==== The Northern-Day Boat ====
The Northern-Day Boat is the worst preserved of Khafre's Solar Ships. It lacks many details because of this, but it is still reminiscent of the Southern-Day Boat when compared. It contained ox bones, a redware incense burner, an alabaster statue upper head piece, a dark green pottery dish, and several fragments of alabaster. It measures 23.5 meters long, 5 meters wide, and 5 meters deep.

==== The Southern "North-South" Solar Boat ====
This boat is perpendicular to Khafre's Pyramid, unlike the rest of the boats that are parallel to the pyramid. It is the largest of the boats and is very corroded. It doesn't have a cabin and is thus thought to be a solar ship as opposed to a night ship. It measures 37.5 meters long and 7 meters deep.

=== Pyramid of Queen Khentkaus I ===
Near the southwest wall of the Pyramid of Queen Khentkaus I, Selim Hassan discovered a rock cut solar boat that measures 30 meters long and 4 meters deep. This boat was roofed over, and thus is thought to represent a night boat. There has been no day boat discovered nearby, though Hassan claims that there may be another boat pit in the area.

== Abu Gorab ==
Niuserre's Sun Temple Plan which shows the ship pit in the lower left side

=== Niuserre Solar ship ===
Niuserre's solar temple is present a few hundred meters away from Abusir in an area known as Abu Gorab. Next to this solar temple is a brick structure that is built in the shape of a solar boat, discovered by Ludwig Borchardt in 1900-1901. Though there is no boat inside, because the building was originally oriented east to west, it is assumed that this is related to a solar barge. Borchardt engaged in a reconstruction of this building, as much of the building was in ruin when it was found.

The building measures 30 meters long, and is about 100 meters away from the solar temple.

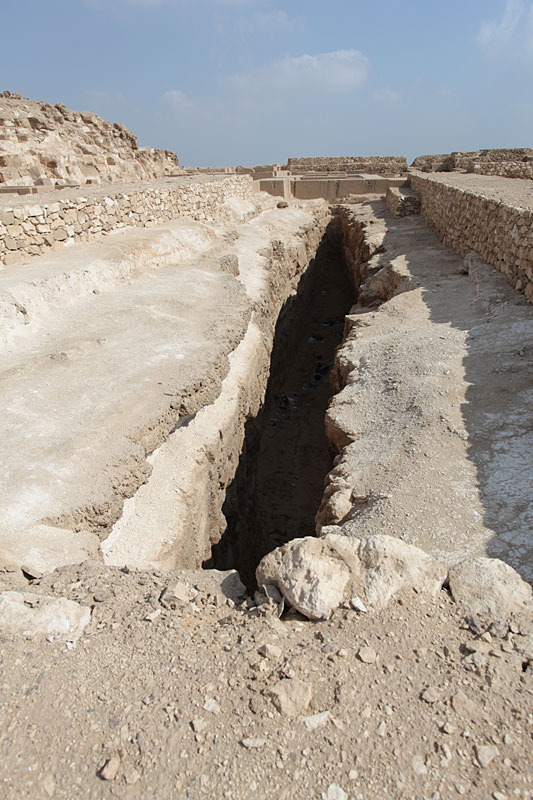
Abu Rawash Pyramid boat pit

== Abu Rawash ==
=== King Den Solar ship ===
A wooden funerary boat thought to have once belonged to First Dynasty King Den has been discovered at Abu Rawash. It is located near an Archaic period cemetery that is in the Abu Rawash complex, which is known for the Pyramid of Djedefre. The boat was discovered by a French team working with the French Institute of Oriental Archaeology in Cairo. There were eleven planks found that belonged to the boat, each measuring 6 meters long and 1.5 meters wide. The planks were sent to the National Museum of Egyptian Civilization.

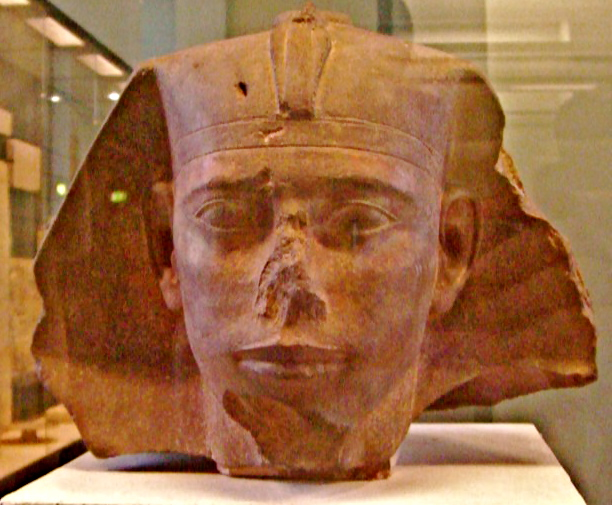
Djedefre Head, found by Emile Chassinat sometime between 1900-1902 when he was excavating the Pyramid of Djedefre

=== Djedefre Solar ship ===
Between 1900 and 1902, Emile Chassinat excavated a boat pit that is east of the Pyramid of Djedefre. Though there is no boat in the pit to measure, the pit itself measured 35 meters deep. The grave is oriented north to south. During excavation, Chassinat uncovered the Djedefre Head, which is a sculpture of King Djedefre's head made out of Egyptian Quartzite. The head has since been transported to the Louvre in the Department of Egyptian Antiquities.

== Abusir ==
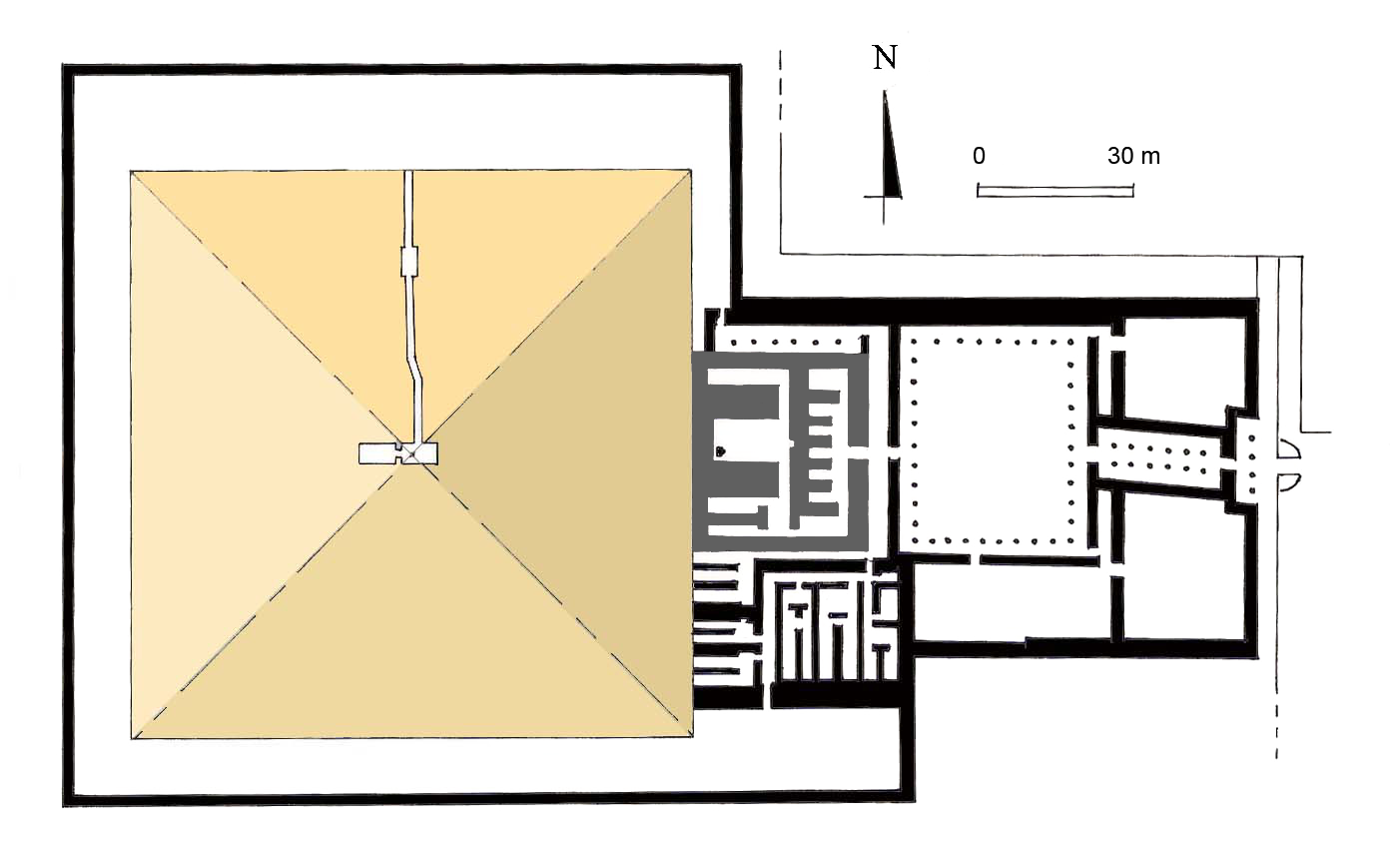
Neferirkare's complex where solar boats were present at both the north and south sides.

=== Neferirkare Solar ship ===
Neferirkare's Pyramid at Abusir is the largest structure in the region. The Abusir Papyri of Neferirkare mentions at least four boats in the area surrounding the pyramid. It claims that there are two ships in sealed rooms around the pyramid, and two other boats north and south of the pyramid.

The Palermo Inscription claims that Neferirkare built a large, brick boat in a Sun-temple built during Neferirkare's reign. This boat was allegedly named "Heart's Desire of Ra."

So far, only one boat has been excavated by Miroslav Verner in the area south of Neferirkare's Pyramid.

== Abydos ==
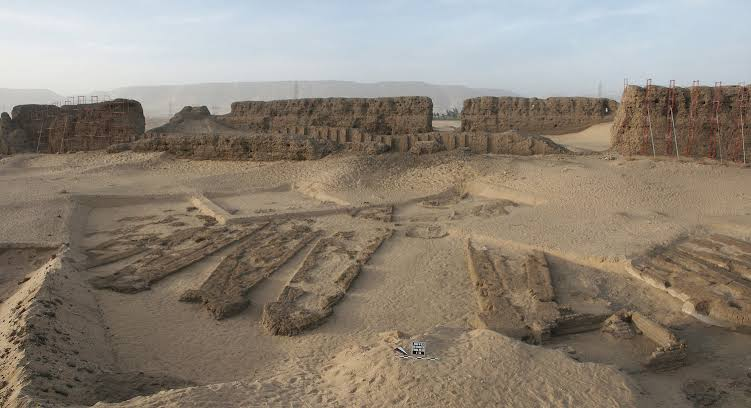
The pits the Abydos boats were buried in, with Khasekhemwy's funerary enclosure Shunet El Zebib visible behind

=== Hor-Aha Solar ships ===
In 1991, in the desert near the temple of Khasekhemwy near Abydos, archaeologists uncovered the remains of fourteen ships dating back to the early first dynasty (2950–2775 BC), possibly associated with Hor-Aha. These 75-foot-long (23 m) ships are buried side by side and have wooden hulls, rough stone boulders which were used as anchors, and "sewn" wooden planks. Also found within their desert graves were remains of the woven straps that joined the planks, as well as reed bundles that were used to seal seams between planks.

Abydos had at least a dozen boat graves adjacent to a massive funerary enclosure for the late Dynasty II (ca. 2675 B.C.) Pharaoh Khasekhemwy. Their age should be more than 400 years older than King Khufu's ships. The length of the structures varied from nearly 20 to 27 m (66 to 89 ft) long, 2.5 meters wide, and about 0.5 meters deep, seating about 30 rowers. They had narrowing sterns and prows, and yellow pigment residue suggests that they were painted. The length of the structures varied from nearly 20 to 27 m (66 to 89 ft).

These are the world's oldest planked hulls. The traditions of the hull construction seen in all the excavated vessels continued through the end of the sixth century BC and, with the substitution of nails for mortise-and-tenon joints, into the present. An abandoned freighter, stripped of its internal timbers and left on a small branch of the Nile near Mataria (ancient Heliopolis, north of modern Cairo) provides the first instance of pegged mortise-and-tenon joints in an Egyptian hull. Not all joints were through-fastened, and the pegs, or treenails, may also have fastened frames to the hull, but for this marks a dramatic departure from previous shipbuilding techniques. Found near the boat grave were 30 pottery jars with pointed bottoms, which were usually used to transport beer.

== Dahshur ==
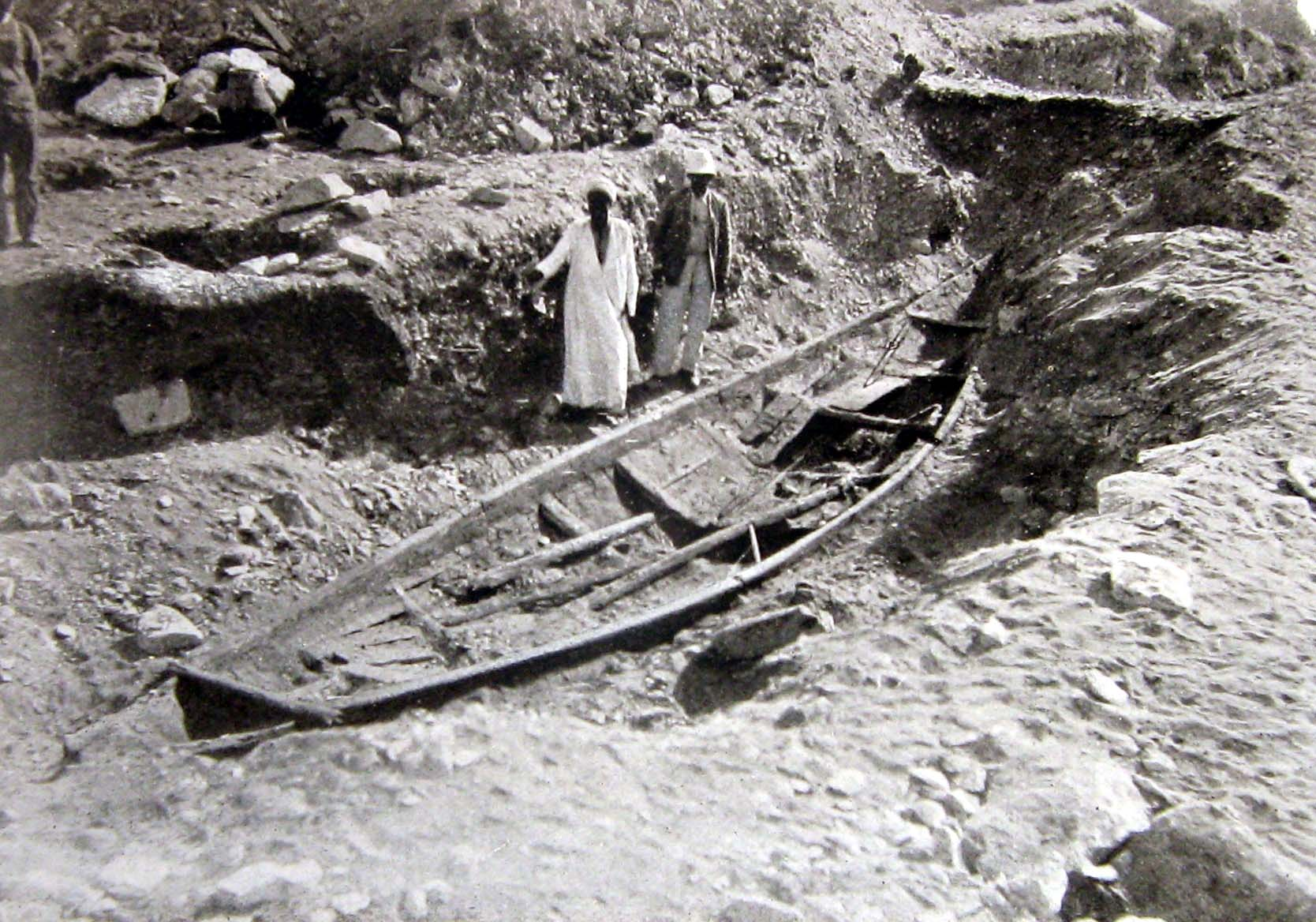
Senusret III boats found near his pyramid in Dahshur, 1895

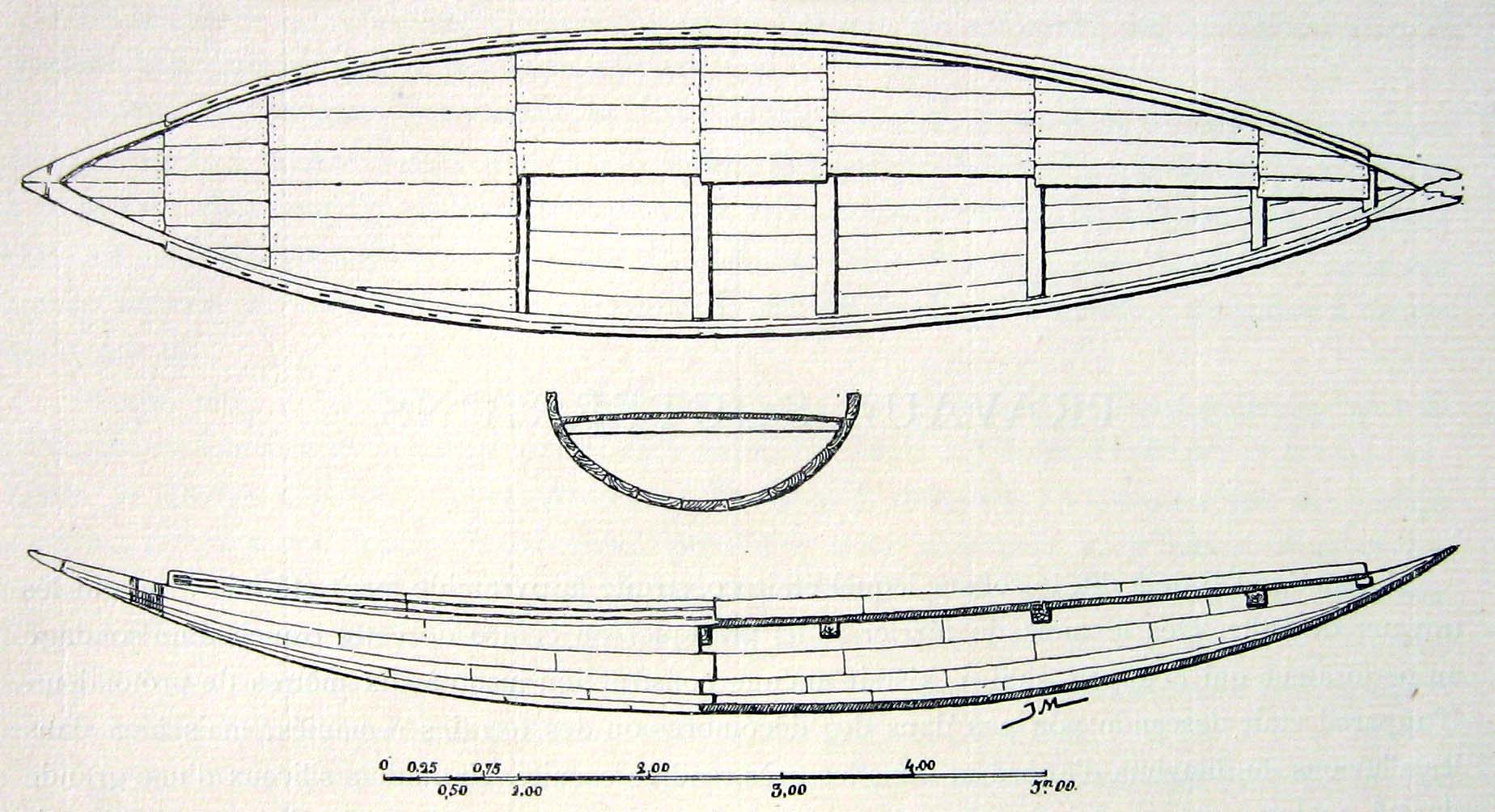
Illustration of Senusret III boats found near his pyramid in Dahshur, 1895

=== Senusret III Solar ships ===
Excavations conducted in 1894 and 1895 by de Morgan at the funerary complex of Senusret III on the plain of Dahshur revealed five or six small boats. He made drawings and measurements of one of the boats (the White boat) from the cache at Dahshur.

Today, only four of the "Dahshur boats" can be located with certainty. Two are in the United States: one in the Carnegie Museum of Natural History in Pittsburgh and one in the Field Museum of Natural History in Chicago. The remaining two were on display in the Cairo Museum, but were relocated to the Sharm El-Sheikh Museum in 2020. These boats are each about 10 meters long.

Since their excavation these boats remained relatively inconspicuous until the mid-1980s when a study of the two hulls in the United States was conducted.

Another boat pit, thought to belong to Senusret III, has also been found south of the Pyramid of Senusret III. This boat pit is lined with bricks and measures 18 meters long. However, no boat was found in the pit.

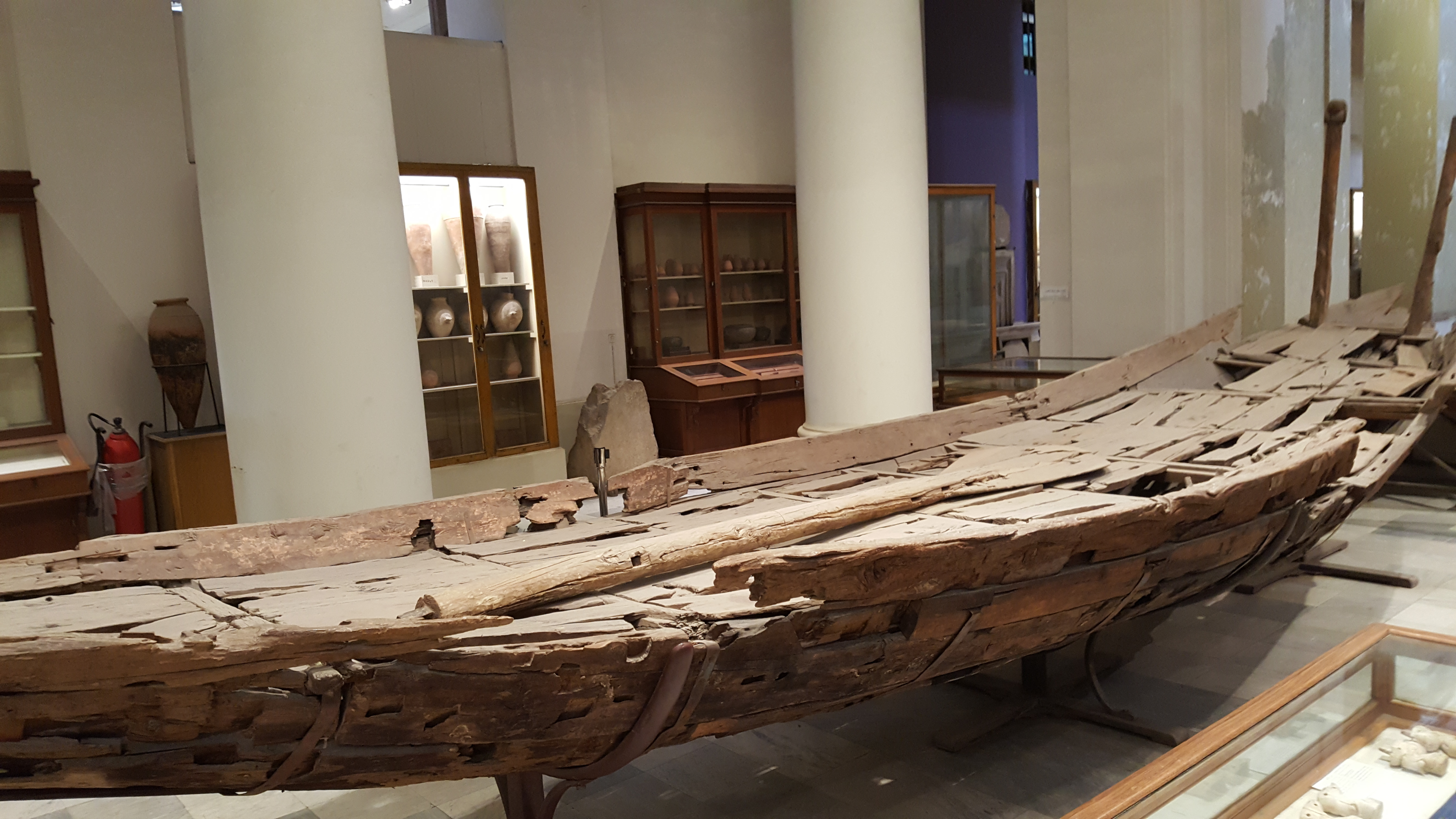
One of the Dahshur boats found near the pyramid of Senusret III

=== Amenemhat III Solar ship ===
This boat pit, located south of the Pyramid of Amenemhat III, was made of brick and measured 15 meters long and 5.57 meters wide. This boat pit was later used as a tomb, though there is no evidence as to when it was converted. The boat pit did not contain any remains for the boat.

== Saqqara ==
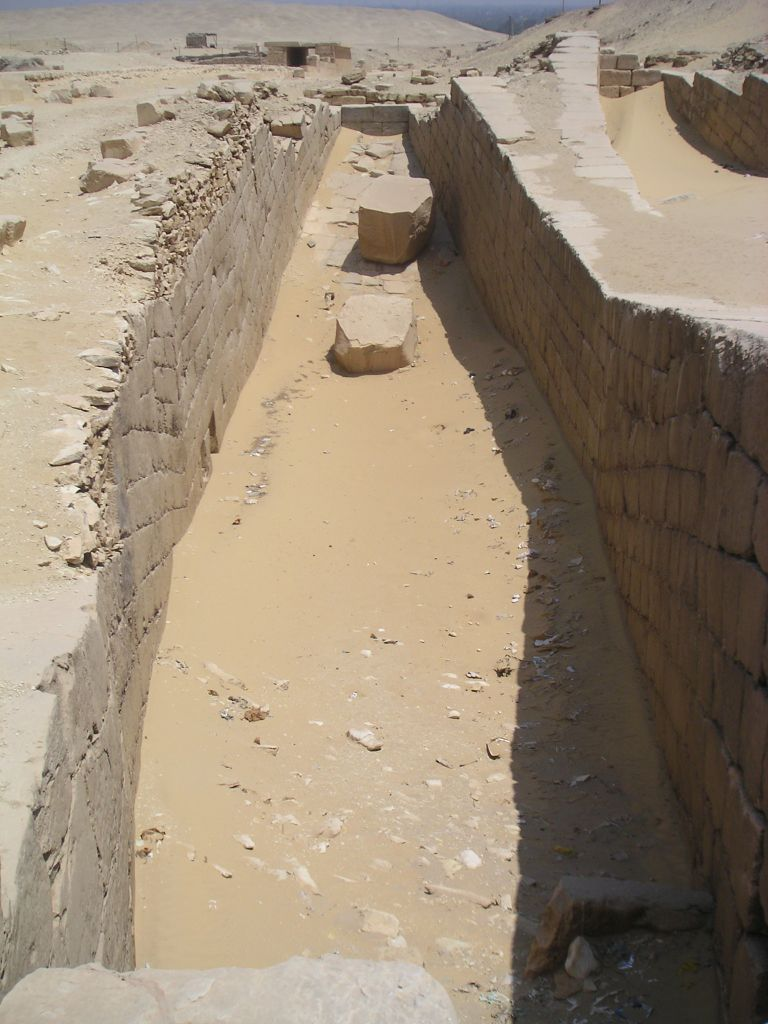
Unas Solar ship at Saqqara near the Pyramid of Unas

=== North Saqqara ===
A 'model estate' and funerary boat was found at Saqqara by Walter Emery (in 1957–58; tomb S 3357, 3 ships). At least 3 mud-brick boat graves were associated with First Dynasty rulers and high-ranking officials.

=== Unas Solar ship ===
The Pyramid of Unas in North Saqqara has two boats. One the boat pits is 44 meters long and is located 150 meters away from Unas' funeral temple. The boats are lined with limestone blocks and are situated east to west, as many solar ships are. The two boat pits are next to each other.

== Tarkhan ==
At least one Old Kingdom boat was found at Tarkhan

== Helwan ==
Four or five boat pits have been found at Helwan by Zaki Youssef Saad. These pits were around 1st Dynasty elite tombs, and are reminiscent of the boat pits found at North Saqqara, Abu Rawash, and Abydos.

== Lisht ==
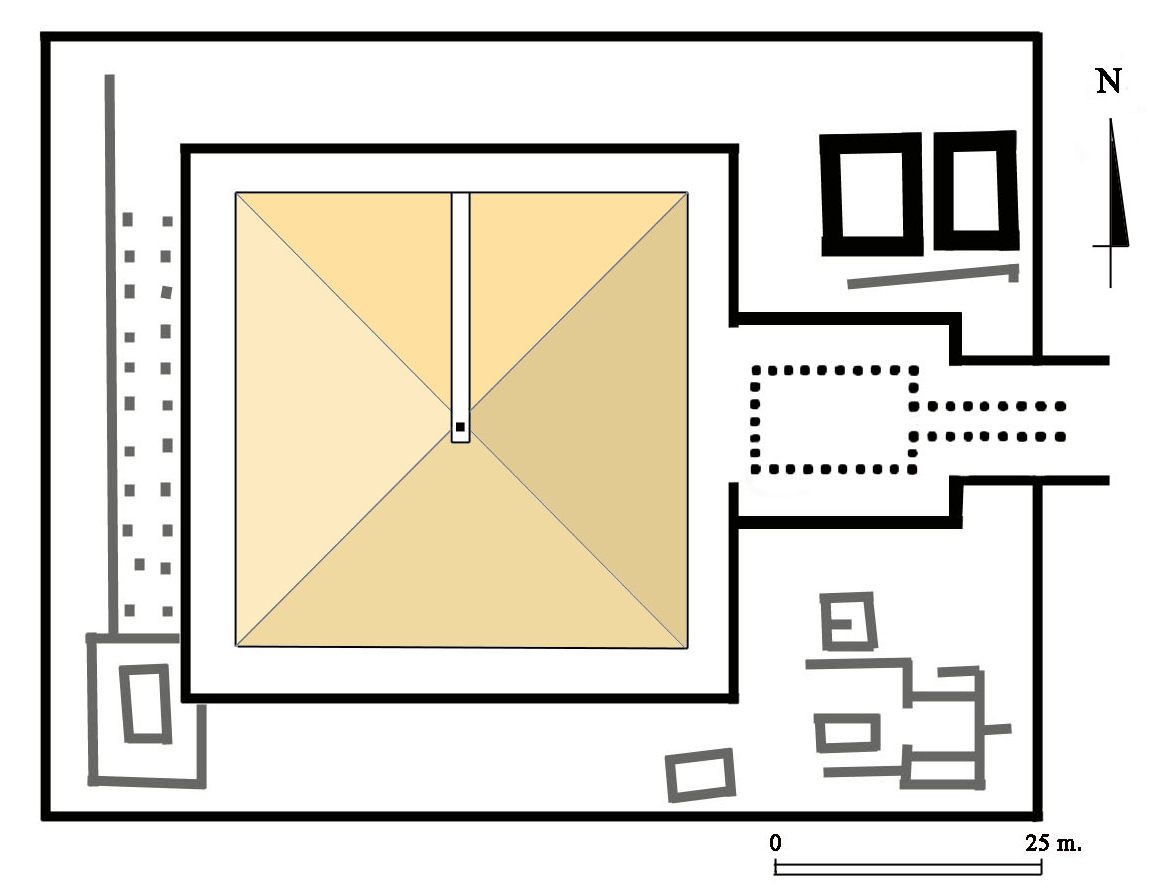
Amenemhat I Solar boat is present at the Western Perimeter of the wall of Amenemhat I Pyramid at Lisht.

=== Senusret Solar ship ===
A 1924 expedition to the Pyramid of Senusret uncovered a large boat pit on the south side of Pyramid 5, which is a pyramid in Senusret's complex. However, they assumed that this pit was a tomb, and excavated it as such. There are no remains of the boat, and any such remains may have been destroyed in the excavation.

The boat was enclosed in a brick chamber. The western end of the pit had been converted to a tomb, though there is no definitive date as to when this took place.

It remains unknown who this boat belonged to. It has been speculated that, because boat pits are usually built on the south side of their owner's tomb, this boat belonged to whoever owned Pyramid 5. However, this remains uncertain.

East of the boat pit was found a collection of faience figurines. Included in these figurines was a cow, 3 women, a dog, a cat, two cucumbers, a bunch of grapes, four figs, four pear-shaped fruits, four grains, and a figurine of a jerboa. Though the official Metropolitan Museum register cards list these as being found in the boat pit, the excavator of the project claims otherwise.

=== Amenemhat I Solar ship ===
A mudbrick boat pit has been found outside Amenemhat I's Pyramid perimeter wall.

== See also ==
- Ancient Egyptian technology
- Ships preserved in museums
