= Khufu ship =

Intact vessel from Ancient Egypt

Coordinates: 29°58′41″N 31°08′04″E

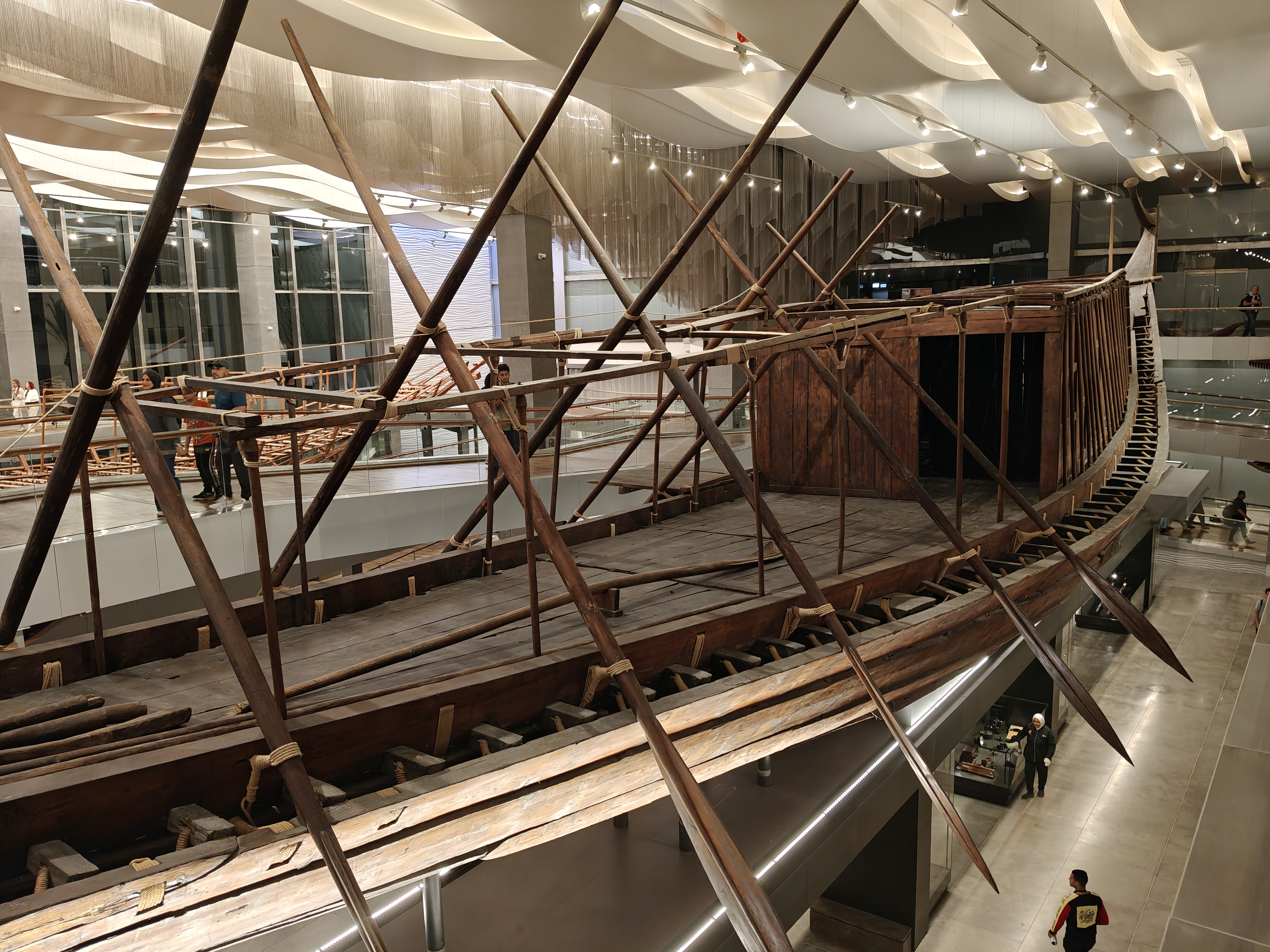
- The reconstructed "solar barge" of Khufu
- Type: Solar barque
- Material: Lebanon cedar
- Length: 43.4 metres (142 ft)
- Width: 5.9 metres (19 ft)
- Created: c. 2500 BC
- Discovered: 1954; Giza pyramid complex
- Discovered by: Kamal el-Mallakh
- Present location: Grand Egyptian Museum, Giza, Egypt
- Culture: Ancient Egypt

The Khufu ship is an intact full-size solar barque from ancient Egypt. It was sealed into a pit alongside the Great Pyramid of pharaoh Khufu around 2500 BC, during the Fourth Dynasty of the ancient Egyptian Old Kingdom. Like other buried Ancient Egyptian ships, it was part of the extensive grave goods intended for use in the afterlife. The Khufu ship is one of the oldest, largest, best preserved vessels from antiquity. It is 43.4 metres (142 ft) long, 5.9 metres (19 ft) wide, and 1.78 meters (5.83 ft) deep, and is the world's oldest intact ship. It has been described as "a masterpiece of woodcraft" that could sail today if put into a lake or a river.

The ship was preserved in the Giza Solar boat museum, but was moved to the Grand Egyptian Museum in August 2021.

== History ==
=== Function ===
The history and function of the ship is not precisely known. It is of the type known as a "solar barge", a ritual vessel believed by ancient Egyptians to carry the resurrected king across the heavens with the sun god Ra. However, it bears some signs of having been used in water, and it is possible that the ship was either a funerary "barge" used to carry the king's embalmed body from Memphis to Giza, or even that Khufu himself used it as a "pilgrimage ship" to visit holy places and that it was then buried for him to use in the afterlife. It contained no bodies, unlike northern European ship burials.

=== Discovery and description ===
Model of the Khufu ship in the Giza Solar boat museum, with the deck removed, showing the rope stitching that holds the planks together

The ship was one of two rediscovered in 1954 by Kamal el-Mallakh—undisturbed since it was sealed into a pit carved out of the Giza bedrock. It was built largely of Lebanon cedar wood, bending the planks in the "shell-first" construction technique, using unpegged tenons of Christ's thorn. The ship was built with a flat bottom composed of several planks, but no actual keel, with the planks and frames lashed together with Halfah grass, and has been reconstructed from 1,224 pieces which had been laid in a logical, disassembled order in the pit beside the pyramid.

It measures 43.4 meters (142 ft) long and 5.9 metres (19 ft) wide. It was thus identified as the world's oldest intact ship and has been described as "a masterpiece of woodcraft" that could sail today if put into a lake, or a river. However, the vessel may not have been designed for sailing, as there is no rigging, or for rowing, as there is no room. Its discovery was described as one of the greatest Ancient Egyptian discoveries in Zahi Hawass's documentary Egypt's Ten Greatest Discoveries.

=== Reconstruction ===
It took years for the boat to be reassembled, primarily by the Egyptian Department of Antiquities' chief restorer, Ahmed Youssef Moustafa. Before reconstructing the boat, Moustafa had to gain enough experience on Ancient Egyptian boatbuilding. He studied the reliefs carved on walls and tombs as well as many of the small wooden models of ships and boats found in tombs. Moustafa visited the Nile boatyards of Old Cairo and Maadi and went to Alexandria, where wooden river boats were still being made. He hoped that modern Egyptian shipwrights had retained shipbuilding methods that would suggest how Ancient Egyptians built their ships. Then he investigated the work of shipwrights who built in a different tradition.

=== Exhibition ===
The Khufu ship was put on public display in a specially built museum at the Giza pyramid complex in 1982; the museum was a small modern facility resting alongside the Great Pyramid. The first floor of the museum took the visitor through visuals, photographs, and writings on the process of excavating and restoring the boat. The ditch where the main boat was found was incorporated into the museum's ground floor design. To see the restored boat, the visitor ascended a staircase leading to the second floor. Floor-to-ceiling windows allowed for much sunlight, and the wooden walkway took the visitor around the boat where the visitor could get a closer view of its impressive size.

In August 2021, the ship was relocated to the Grand Egyptian Museum.

== Gallery ==
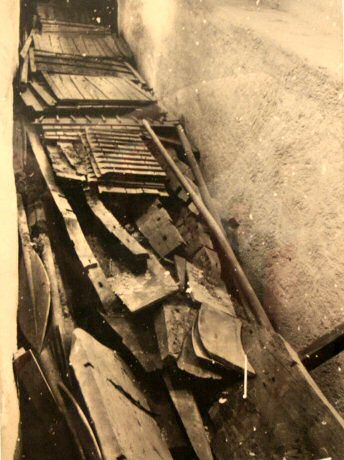
The Khufu ship shortly after its discovery

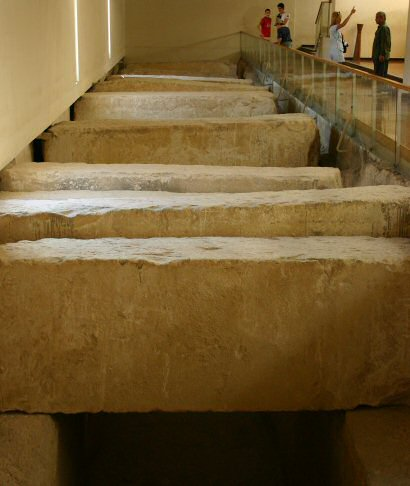
The boat pit in which the Khufu ship was discovered, inside the Solar Boat Museum

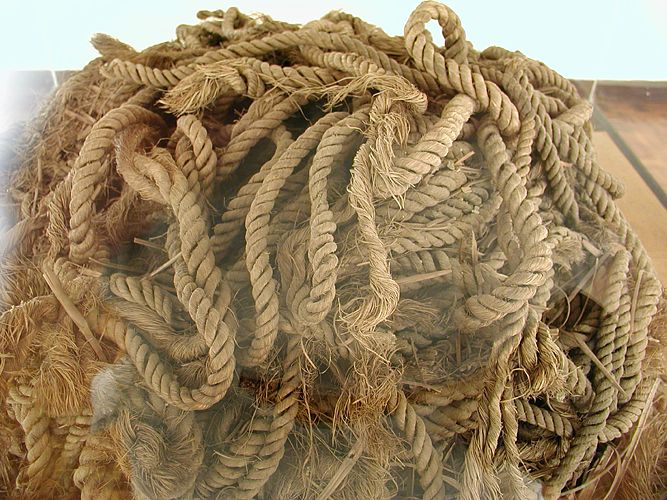
Original rope discovered with the Khufu ship

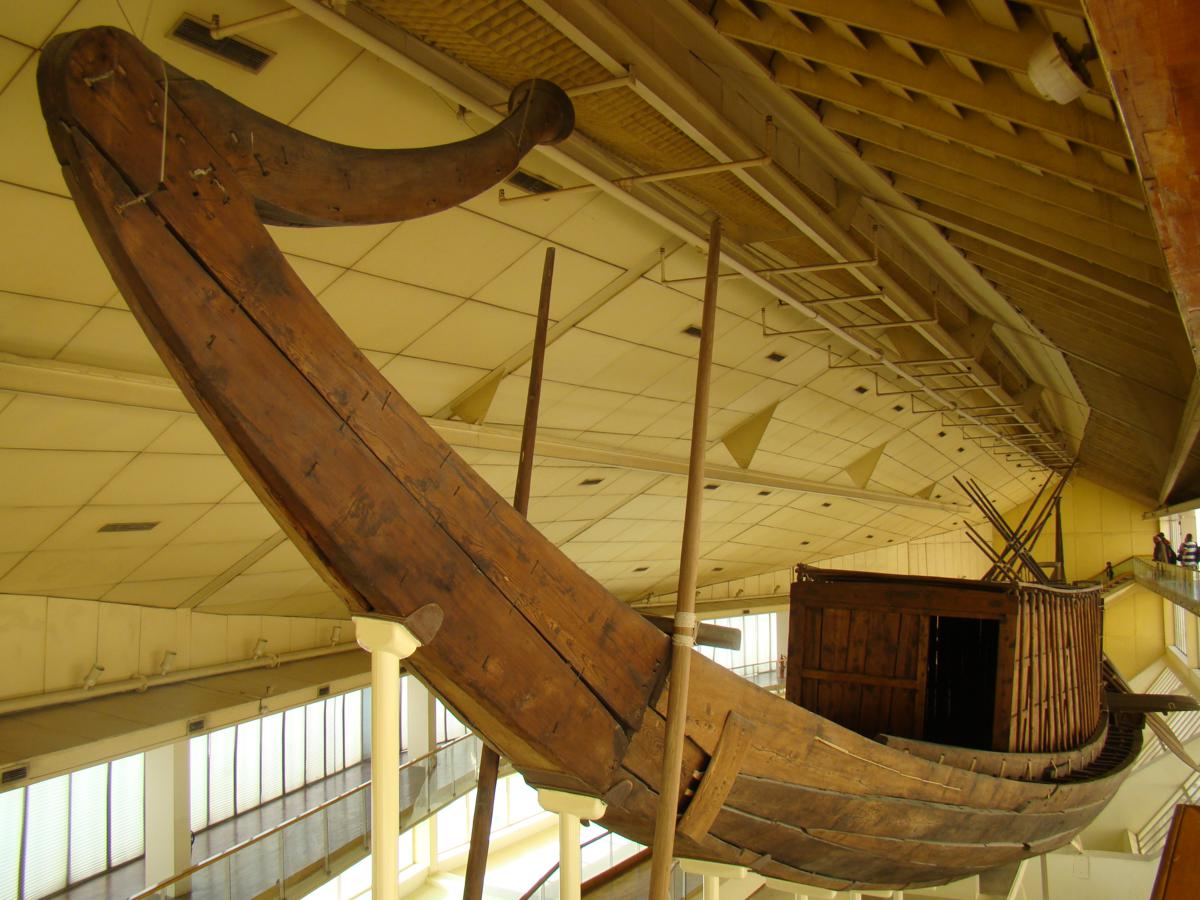
The Khufu ship in the Solar boat museum

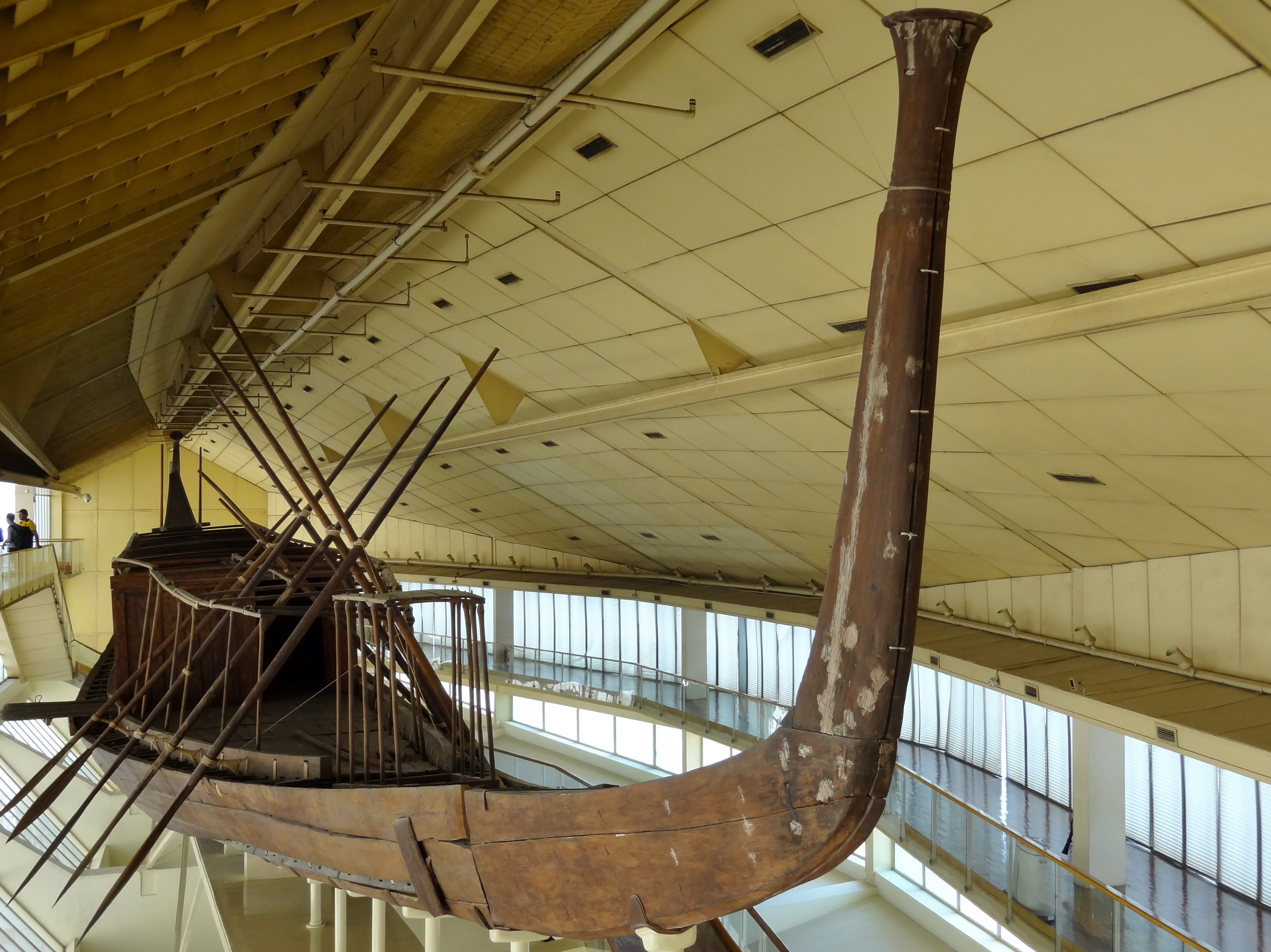
The Khufu ship in the Solar boat museum

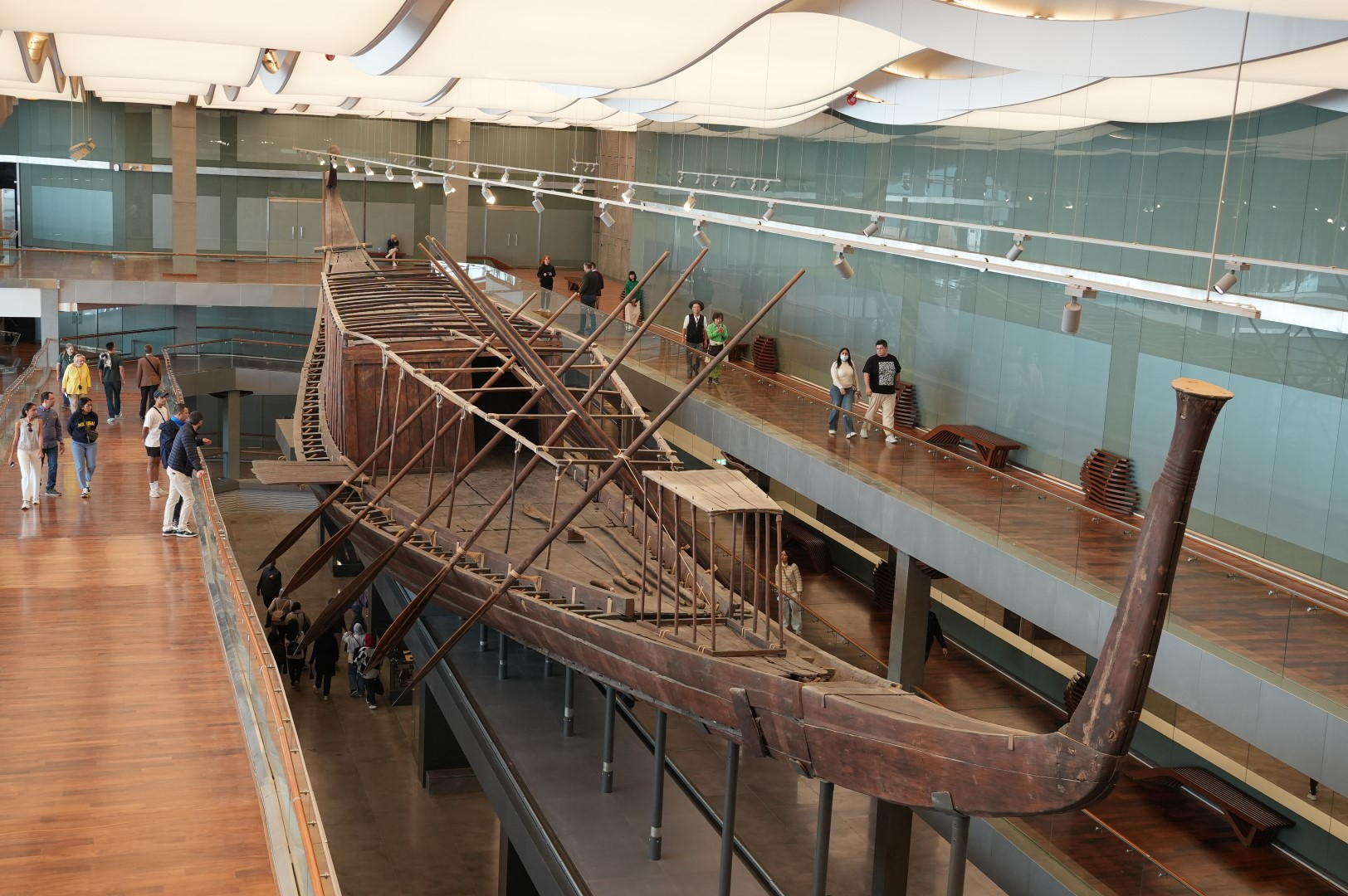
The Khufu ship in the Grand Egyptian Museum

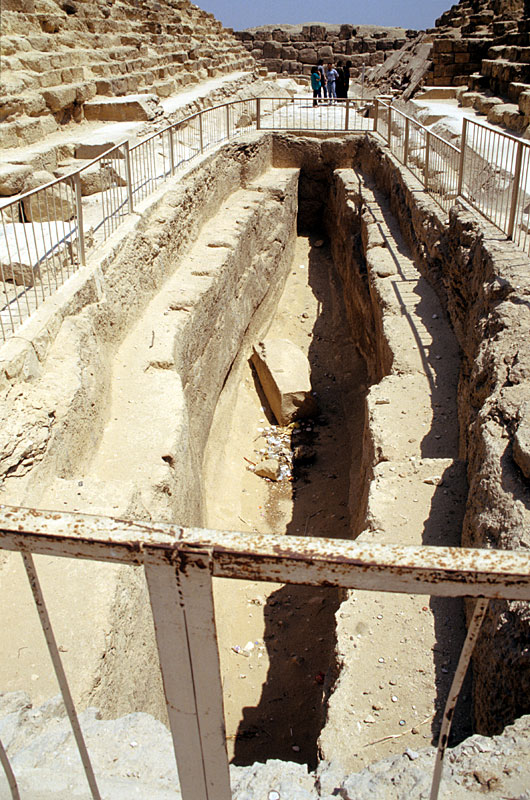
Solar boat pit, Giza Plateau, Egypt

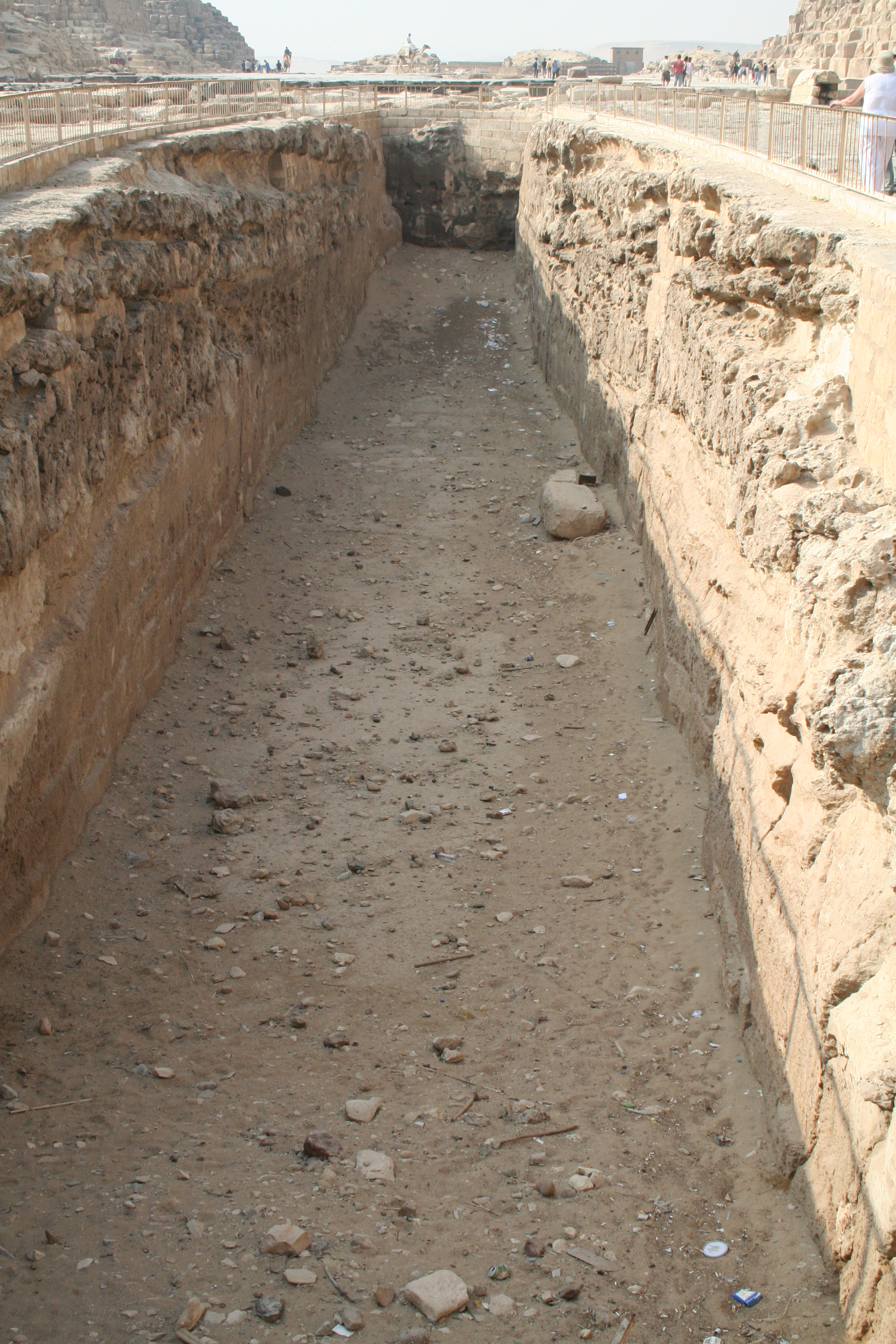
One of the boat pits on the east side of the Great Pyramid

== See also ==
- Atet
- Abydos boats
- Ancient Egyptian technology
- Dahshur boats
- List of surviving ancient ships
- Ships preserved in museums
