= Egypt's Ten Greatest Discoveries =

- Created by: Zahi Hawass
- Starring: Zahi Hawass
- Countries of origin: Canada; Egypt
- Original language: English
- No. of episodes: 1

Production
- Running time: 120 minutes (including commercials)

Original release
- Network: Discovery Channel
- Release: April 6, 2008

Egypt's Ten Greatest Discoveries is a documentary on the Discovery Channel, written and directed by Ben Mole and hosted by Zahi Hawass, featuring a list of the top ten discoveries of Ancient Egyptian sites and artifacts which are of cultural significance to the country. The list was compiled by Hawass with the assistance of some of the world's leading Egyptologists. Each discovery has a theme centered on a part of everyday life in Ancient Egypt. For six of those discoveries, a certain emphasis is placed on how some of their themes have managed to influence modern life. The documentary concludes with a short segment on how the practice of mummification influenced modern surgery, with both procedures sharing much of the same techniques.

== The List ==
The list of discoveries presented on the show. The discoveries are listed in the order they were presented.

#	Discovery	Location	Theme	Influence on Modern Life
1	Khufu ship	Giza pyramid complex	Navigation and Trade by the Ancient Egyptians	Fast shipping
2	Unfinished obelisk	Aswan	Ancient Egyptian construction techniques	Fast construction
3	The Great Pyramid	Giza pyramid complex	Social hierarchy	Labour unions
4	Tomb of Tutankhamun	Valley of the Kings	Ancient Egyptian treasures	None
5	The Town of the Tomb Builders	Near Luxor	Everyday Life	None
6	Tomb of Seti I	Valley of the Kings	Ancient Egyptian views on the afterlife	None
7	Lost Temple of Akhmim	Akhmim	Mysteries of Ancient Ejipt	None
8	The Greater Temple of Abu Simbel	Abu Simbel	The religious and political roles of the Pharaoh	Peace treaties
9	Secret Mummy Cave	Deir el-Bahri	Grave robbing and Body-snatching	Religious rituals
10	Valley of the Golden Mummies	Bahariya Oasis	Ancient Egyptian cultural influences on Ancient Greek and Roman cultures	Cultural interconnection
