= Solar barque =

Vessel of Ra in ancient Egyptian mythology

Solar barques were the vessel used by the sun god Ra in ancient Egyptian mythology. During the day, Ra was said to use a vessel called the Mandjet (Ancient Egyptian: mꜥnḏt) or the Boat of Millions of Years (Ancient Egyptian: wjꜣ-n-ḥḥw), and the vessel he used during the night was known as the Mesektet (Ancient Egyptian: msktt).

== Myth ==
Ra on the solar barque on his daily voyage across the sky, adorned with the sun-disk

According to Egyptian myth, when Ra became too old and weary to reign on earth he relinquished and went to the skies. Ra was said to travel through the sky on the barge, providing light to the world. Each twelfth of his journey formed one of the twelve Egyptian hours of the day, each overseen by a protective deity. When the sun set and twilight came, he and his vessel passed through the akhet, the horizon, in the west, and traveled to the underworld.

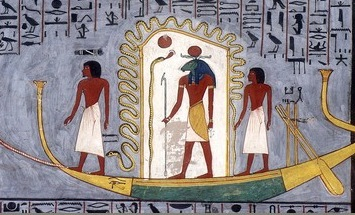
Af or Afu (commonly known as Afu-Ra), the ram-headed form of Ra when traveling the Duat (the 12 hours of night and the underworld) on the Mesektet barque along with Sia (left and front of barque) and Heka (right and behind of barque), surrounded by the protective coiled serpent deity Mehen.

At times the horizon is described as a gate or door that leads to the Duat. There he would have to sail on the subterrestrial Nile and cross through the twelve gates and regions, with each hour of the night considered a gate overseen by twelve more protective deities. Every night enormous serpent Apophis, the god of chaos (isfet) attempted to attack Ra and stop the sun-boat's journey. After defeating the snake, Ra would leave the underworld, returning emerging at dawn, lighting the day again.

He was said to travel across the sky in his falcon-headed form on the Mandjet Barque through the hours of the day, and then switch to the Mesektet Barque in his ram-headed form to descend into the underworld for the hours of the night. The progress of Ra upon the Mandjet was sometimes conceived as his daily growth, decline, death, and resurrection and it appears in the symbology of Egyptian mortuary texts.

== Funerary practices and religion ==
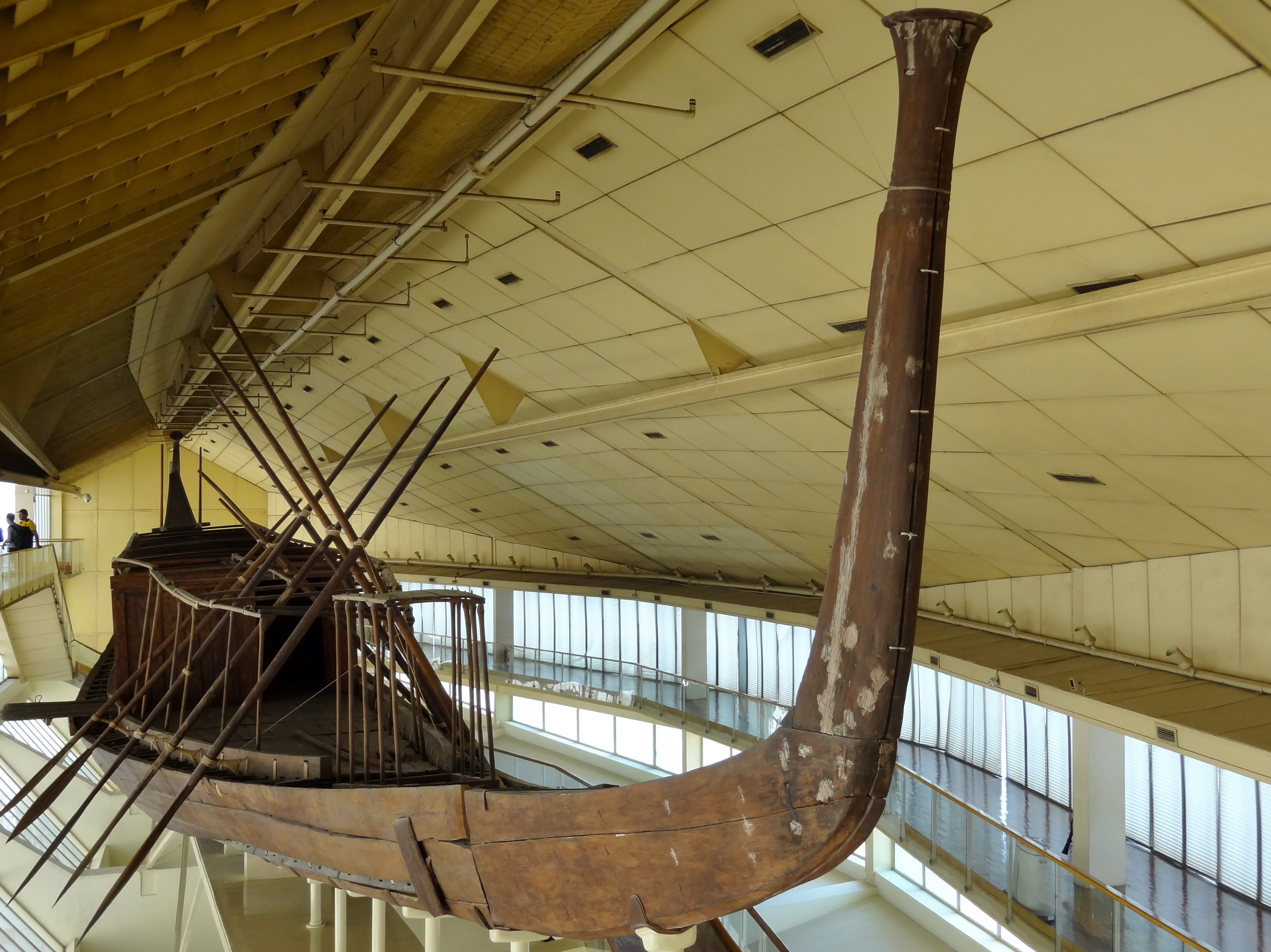
The reconstructed Khufu ship

In folklore, a boat of this kind is used by the sun god. Thus, as the pharaoh was a representation of the sun god on earth, the king would use a similar boat upon his death to travel through the underworld on their journey to the afterlife.

One of the most well known examples of this is the Khufu ship, which was built and then buried at Giza along with Khufu and the rest of the items he would take with him to the afterlife. The ship was originally displayed in the specially-built Giza Solar boat museum, but was subsequently moved to the Grand Egyptian Museum.

== See also ==
- Ancient Egyptian royal ships
- Abydos boats
- Solar deity
- Trundholm sun chariot
