= Kamal el-Mallakh =

Egyptian archaeologist

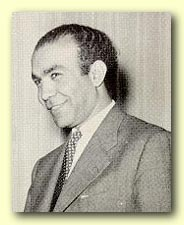
- Born: October 26, 1918; Egypt
- Died: October 29, 1987
- Occupation: archaeologist

Kamal el-Mallakh (Arabic: كمال الملاخ) was a famous Egyptian archaeologist who was among the Egyptian antiquities inspectors who discovered the King Khufu Solar ship in 1954.

== Life ==
El Mallakh was born to a Coptic Christian Orthodox family from Upper Egypt on 26 October 1918 and died on 29 October 1987.

He graduated from the School of Fine Arts in 1943 with a degree in Architecture and then received a master's degree in Egyptology from Cairo University. In 1954 El Mallakh discovered two pits just south of the Great Pyramids of Giza on Cairo's western outskirts, he found Cheops' first boat, the oldest wooden relic of Ancient Egypt Kingdom.

El Mallakh maintained that a nearby pit contained another boat. His theory was that the two boats were to ferry Cheops' soul on a perpetual circle through the heavens, one for day time one for night. Other Archeologists denied the pit but it was an American National Geographic society who discovered it which indeed held a boat. Kamal worked in the Giza area for 14 years where he discovered Khufu ship.

In his later life he became one of the founders of the Cairo International Film Festival while working as a journalist for Al-Ahram newspaper.

== Books ==
- The Gold of Tutankhamen, Kamal El-Mallakh & Arnold Brackman (1978). ISBN 0-88225-264-X
- Treasures of the Nile: art of the temples and tombs of Egypt (1980). ISBN 0-88225-293-3
- Al-Ustadh (1981). ISBN 977-734-520-8
- al-Akawan Sayf wa-Adham Wanli (1984). ISBN 977-01-0271-7
- Gamal Es-Seguini (1985). ASIN B000KW144Y
- Cairo: Giza-Sakkarh-Memphis (1987). ISBN 88-7011-630-1

== See also ==
- List of Copts
- Egyptian cinema
- Lists of Egyptians
