= Ancient Egyptian technology =

Devices, and technologies invented or used in Ancient Egypt

Ancient technology

- Egyptian technology
- Indian technology
- Chinese technology
- Greek technology
- Roman technology
- Iranian technology
- African technology

Ancient Egyptian technology describes devices and technologies invented or used in ancient Egypt. The Egyptians invented and used many simple machines, such as the ramp and the lever, to aid construction processes. They used rope trusses to stiffen the beam of ships. Egyptian paper, made from papyrus, and pottery were mass-produced and exported throughout the Mediterranean Basin. The wheel was used for a number of purposes, but chariots only came into use after the Second Intermediate Period. The Egyptians also played an important role in developing Mediterranean maritime technology including ships and lighthouses.

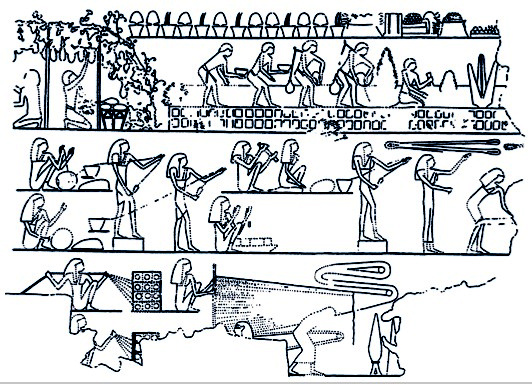
Ancient Egyptian depiction of women engaged in mechanical rope making, the first graphic evidence of the craft, shown in the two lower rows of the illustration

== Technology in Dynastic Egypt ==
Significant advances in ancient Egypt during the dynastic period include astronomy, mathematics, and medicine. Their geometry was a necessary outgrowth of surveying to preserve the layout and ownership of fertile farmland, which was flooded annually by the Nile River. The 3,4,5 right triangle and other rules of thumb served to represent rectilinear structures, and the post and lintel architecture of Egypt. Egypt also was a center of alchemy research for much of the western world.

=== Paper, writing and libraries ===
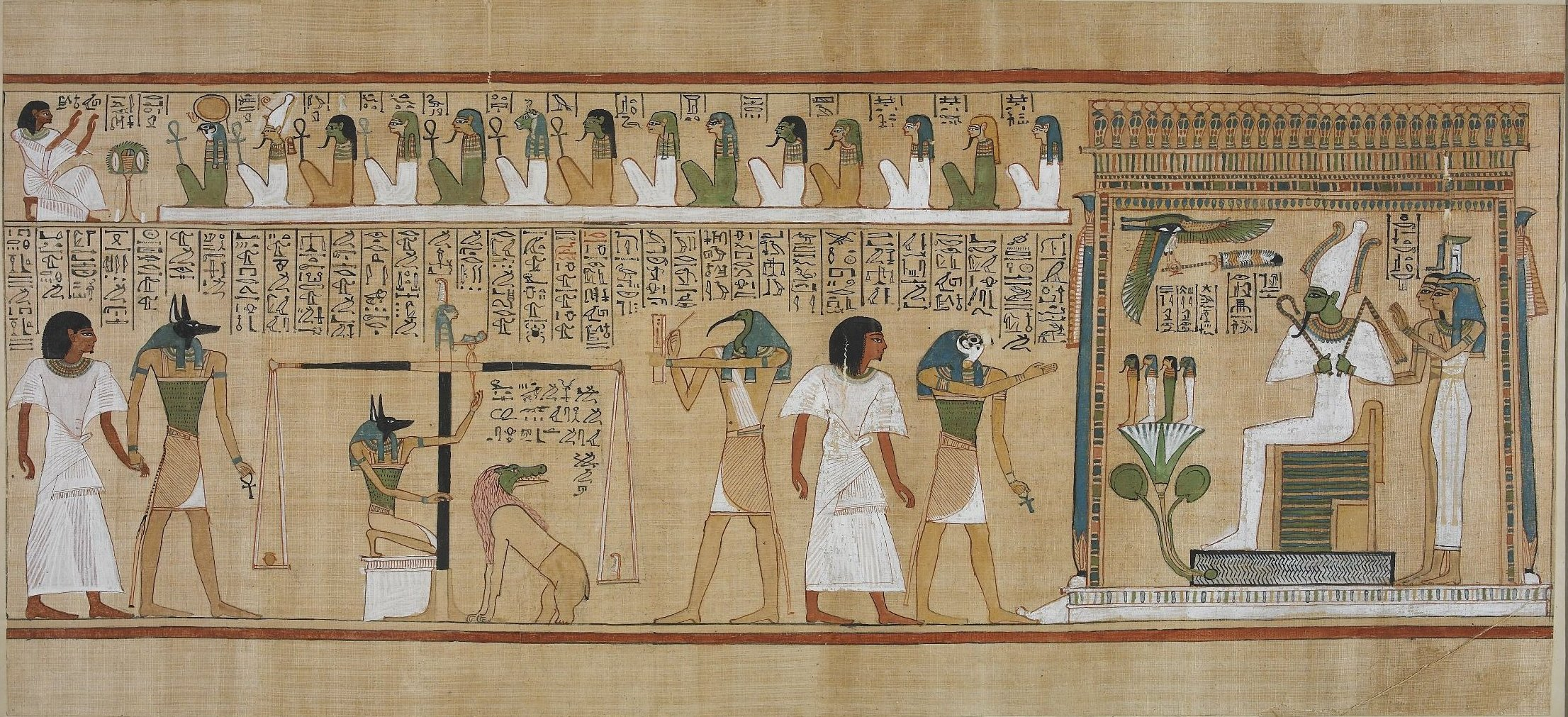
A section of the Egyptian Book of the Dead, which is written and drawn on papyrus

The word paper comes from the Greek term for the ancient Egyptian writing material called papyrus, which was formed from beaten strips of papyrus plants. Papyrus was produced in Egypt as early as 3000 BC and was sold to ancient Greece and Rome. Egyptians were the first to use reed pens and Ink which they used to write on papyrus. The first mention of writing on Parchment also comes from the Fourth Dynasty of Egypt. The establishment of the Library of Alexandria limited the supply of papyrus for others. According to the Roman historian Pliny the Elder (Natural History records, xiii.21), as a result of this, parchment was invented under the patronage of Eumenes II of Pergamon to build his rival library at Pergamon. However, this is a myth; parchment had been in use in Anatolia and elsewhere long before the rise of Pergamon.

Egyptian hieroglyphs, a phonetic writing system, served as the basis for the Phoenician alphabet from which later alphabets, such as Hebrew, Greek, and Latin were derived. With this ability, writing and record-keeping, the Egyptians developed one of the – if not the – first decimal system. Egyptian writing is also considered the oldest in the world along with Sumerian writing.

The city of Alexandria retained preeminence for its records and scrolls with its library. With the ascension of Ptolemy VIII Physcon, however, all foreign scholars were expelled from the city and the head librarian was forced to flee to Cyprus; due to this, the library lost its prestige and began a period of decline. Part of the library was damaged by fire during the siege of Alexandria, and while by some accounts it was destroyed completely by 642 CE, the library had disappeared from contemporary accounts by the third century CE and many of its scrolls and scholarship had likely been distributed to the other libraries springing up throughout Alexandria and across the eastern Mediterranean.

=== Structures and construction ===
==== Materials and tools ====
Some of the older materials used in the construction of Egyptian housing included reeds and clay. According to Lucas and Harris, "reeds were plastered with clay in order to keep out of heat and cold more effectually". Windcatchers were also used in Egyptian houses for cooling and ventilation. Tools that were used included "limestone, chiseled stones, wooden mallets, and stone hammers", but also some more sophisticated hand tools. Wide range of lithic tools was used in Predynastic and Dynastic Egypt throughout the whole Egyptian Bronze Age.

Ancient Egyptian metal tool kit is well described and it consisted of metal blades of chisels, adzes, axes, saws and drills, used for the work on various types of wood and stones. Also, the ancient Egyptians were apparently using core drills in stonework at least as long ago as the Fourth Dynasty, probably made of copper or arsenical copper and used in conjunction with a harder abrasive substance.

The earliest alloy used for the production of tools was arsenical bronze/copper, of which e.g. the tools used at Old Kingdom Giza were manufactured. This alloy is harder than the "pure copper", presumed to be used by ancient Egyptians in earlier, now outdated works. In the New Kingdom, the predominant practical alloy was tin bronze.

There has been some dispute among archaeologists over whether the abrasive was quartz sand or a harder mineral such as corundum, emery or diamond, and whether it was loose or embedded in the metal. Lime mortar was used to plaster the Giza pyramids in addition to various limes incorporated into temples and homes.

==== Buildings ====
===== Temples =====
Many Egyptian temples are not standing today. Some are in ruin from wear and tear, while others have been lost entirely. The Egyptian structures are among the largest constructions ever conceived and built by humans. They constitute one of the most potent and enduring symbols of ancient Egyptian civilization. Temples and tombs built by a pharaoh famous for her projects, Hatshepsut, were massive and included many colossal statues of her. Pharaoh Tutankamun's rock-cut tomb in the Valley of the Kings was full of jewelry and antiques. In some late myths, Ptah was identified as the primordial mound and had called creation into being, he was considered the deity of craftsmen, and in particular, of stone-based crafts. Imhotep, who was included in the Egyptian pantheon, was the first documented engineer.

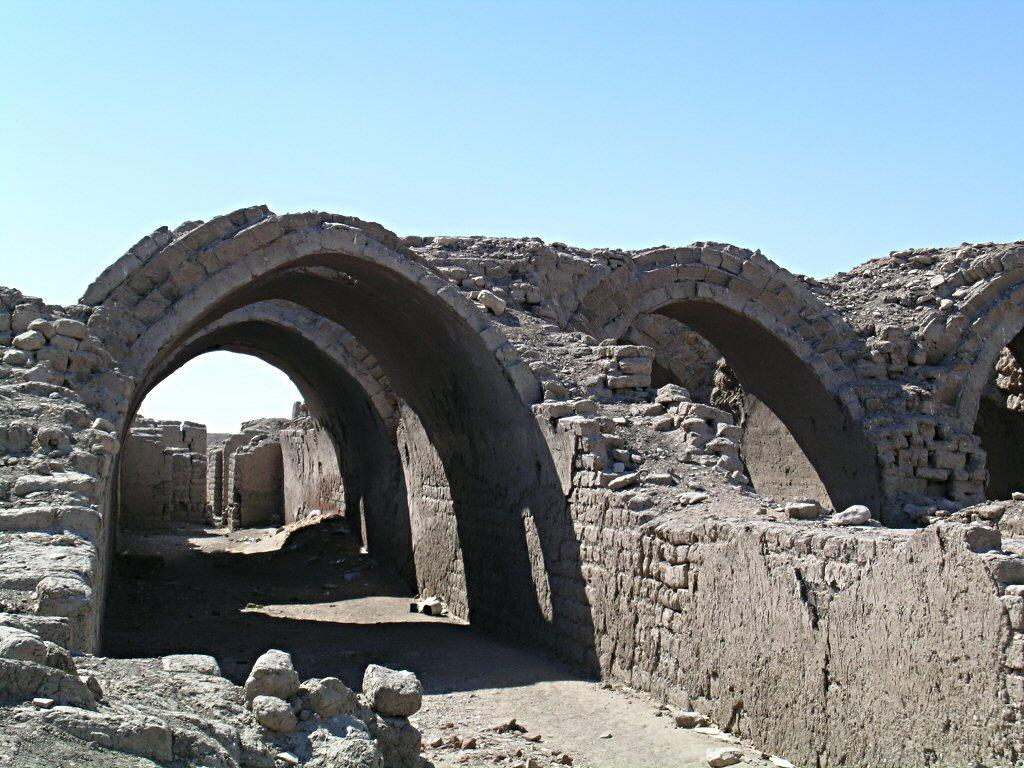
Ramesseum, Luxor, C13 BC, warehouse with parabolic barrel vaults of adobe

===== Vaults =====
Adobe vaults were a type of structures spanning from the end of the first dynasty tomb of Qa'a, about 2900 BC, to Coptic times. The first such vaults were built underground, in the construction of tombs, but most of them were built overground, instead of roofs for lack of timber. Some adobe vaults were supported on columns and architraves, such as in the throne hall of Ramesses's III palace from 1200 BC at Madinet Habu. The barrel vaults of the store rooms of the Ramesseum in Luxor have parabolic cross sections, demonstrating an understanding of statics.

===== Lighthouse =====
In Hellenistic Egypt, lighthouse technology was developed, the most famous example being the Lighthouse of Alexandria. Alexandria was a port for the ships that traded the goods manufactured in Egypt or imported into Egypt. A giant cantilevered hoist lifted cargo to and from ships. The lighthouse itself was designed by Sostratus of Cnidus and built in the 3rd century BC (between 285 and 247 BC) on the island of Pharos in Alexandria, Egypt, which has since become a peninsula. This lighthouse was renowned in its time and knowledge of it was never lost.

===== Monuments =====
The Nile valley has been the site of one of the most influential civilizations in the world with its architectural monuments, which include the Giza pyramid complex and the Great Sphinx.

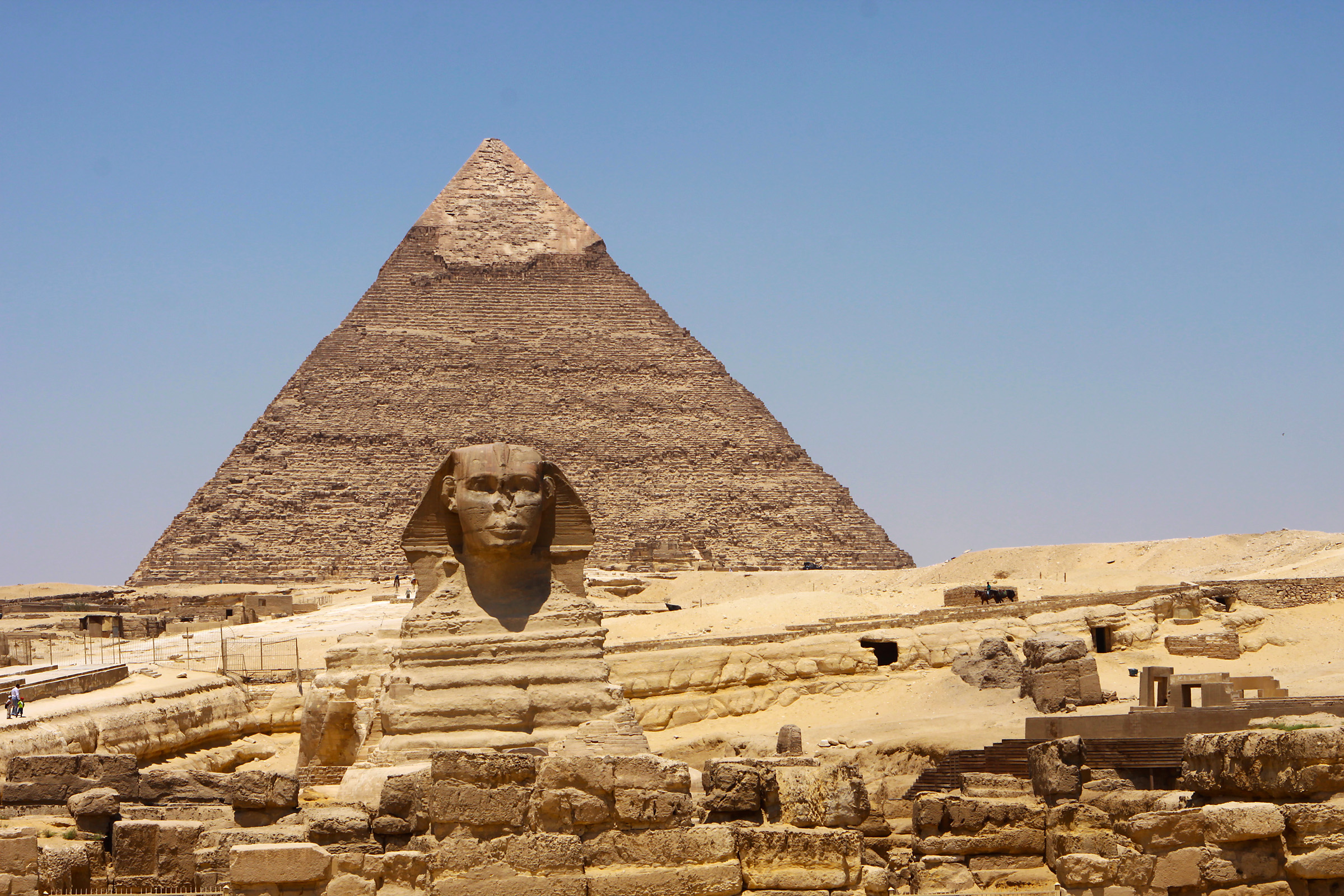
Giza Plateau, Cairo. Khafre's pyramid in the background

The most famous pyramids are the Egyptian pyramids—huge structures built of brick or stone, some of which are among the largest constructions by humans. Pyramids functioned as tombs for pharaohs. In ancient Egypt, a pyramid was referred to as mer, literally "place of ascendance." The Great Pyramid of Giza is the largest in Egypt and one of the largest in the world. The base is over 13 acres (53,000 m^{2}) in area. It is one of the Seven Wonders of the Ancient World and the only one of the seven to survive into modern times. The ancient Egyptians capped the peaks of their pyramids with gold plated pyramidions and covered their faces with polished white limestone, although many of the stones used for the finishing purpose have fallen or been removed for use on other structures over the millennia.

The Red Pyramid (c.26th century BC), named for the light crimson hue of its exposed granite surfaces, is the third largest of Egyptian pyramids. Menkaure's Pyramid, likely dating to the same era, was constructed of limestone and granite blocks. The Great Pyramid of Giza (c. 2580 BC) contains a sarcophagus fashioned of red Aswan granite. The mostly ruined Black Pyramid dating from the reign of Amenemhat III once had a polished granite pyramidion or capstone, now on display in the main hall of the Egyptian Museum in Cairo. Other uses in ancient Egypt include columns, door lintels, sills, jambs, and wall and floor veneer.

The ancient Egyptians had some of the first monumental stone buildings (such as in Saqqara), which are largely built of local limestones. How the Egyptians worked the solid granite is still a matter of debate. Tool marks described by the Egyptologist Anna Serotta indicate the use of flint tools on finer work with harder stones, e.g. when producing the hieroglyphic inscriptions. Archaeologist Patrick Hunt has postulated that the Egyptians used emery shown to have higher hardness on the Mohs scale. Regarding construction, of the various methods possibly used by builders, the lever moved and uplifted obelisks weighing more than 100 tons.

===== Obelisks and pillars =====
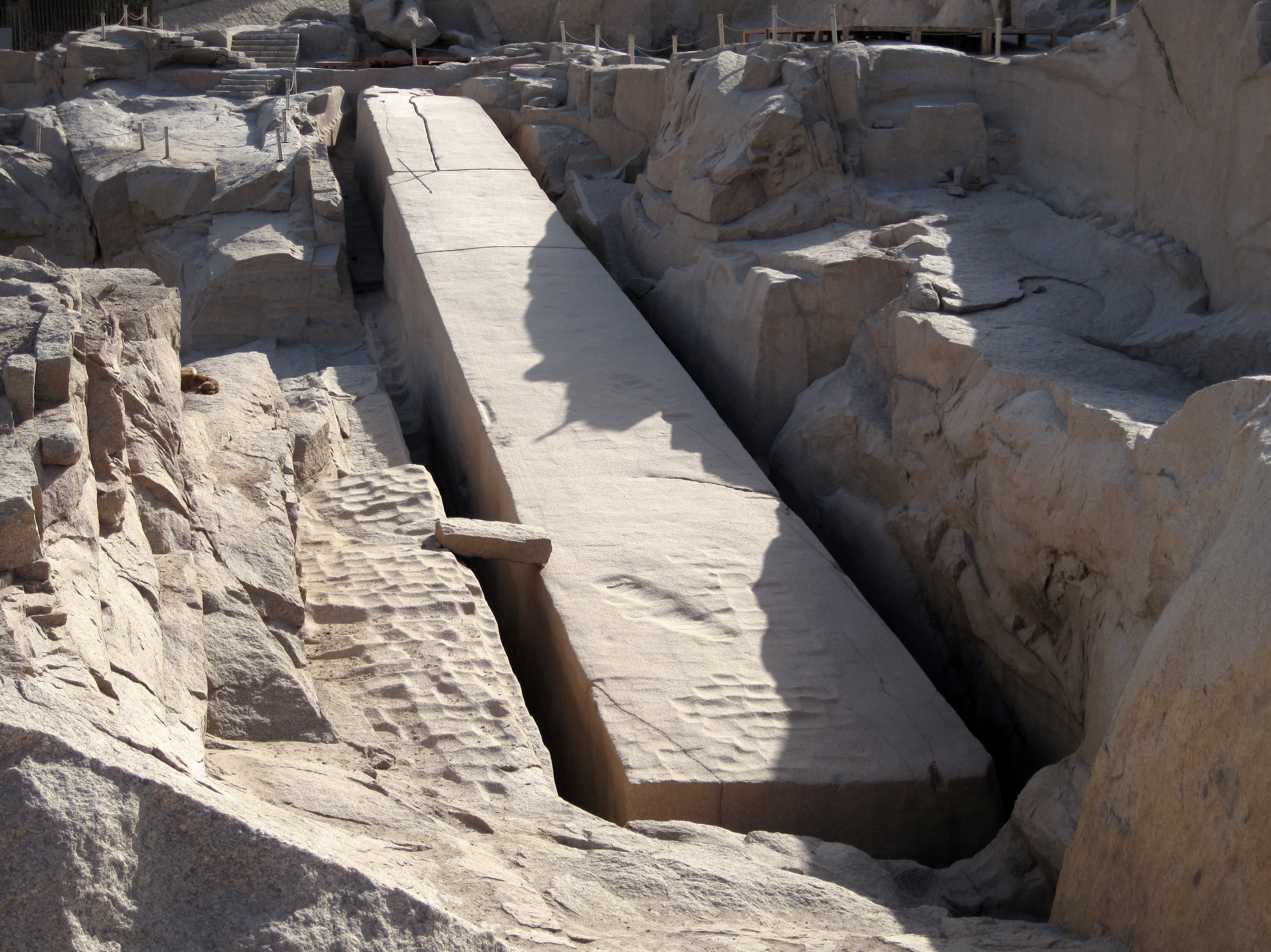
The Unfinished obelisk in Aswan

Obelisks were a prominent part of the ancient Egyptian architecture, placed in pairs at the entrances of various monuments and important buildings such as temples. Earliest known obelisk fragment is that of King Teti (died c. 2333 BC) from the Old Kingdom, found at Heliopolis. In 1902, Encyclopædia Britannica wrote: "The earliest temple obelisk still in position is that of Senusret I of the XIIth Dynasty at Heliopolis (68 feet high)". The word obelisk is of Greek rather than Egyptian origin because Herodotus, the great traveler, was the first writer to describe the objects. Twenty-nine ancient Egyptian obelisks are known to have survived, plus the Unfinished obelisk being built by Hatshepsut to celebrate her sixteenth year as pharaoh. It broke while being carved out of the quarry and was abandoned when another one was begun to replace it. The broken one was found at Aswan and provides some of the only insight into the methods of how they were hewn.

The obelisk symbolized the sky deity Ra and during the brief religious reformation of Akhenaten was said to be a petrified ray of the Aten, the sun disk. It is hypothesized by New York University Egyptologist Patricia Blackwell Gary and Astronomy senior editor Richard Talcott that the shapes of the ancient Egyptian pyramid and obelisk were derived from natural phenomena associated with the sun (the sun-god Ra being the Egyptians' greatest deity). It was also thought that the deity existed within the structure. The Egyptians also used pillars extensively.

Ramps have been reported as being widely used in Ancient Egypt. A ramp is an inclined plane, or a plane surface set at an angle (other than a right angle) against a horizontal surface. The inclined plane permits one to overcome a large resistance by applying a relatively small force through a longer distance than the load is to be raised. In civil engineering the slope (ratio of rise/run) is often referred to as a grade or gradient. An inclined plane is one of the commonly-recognized simple machines.

=== Ship building ===
Predynastic Egypt

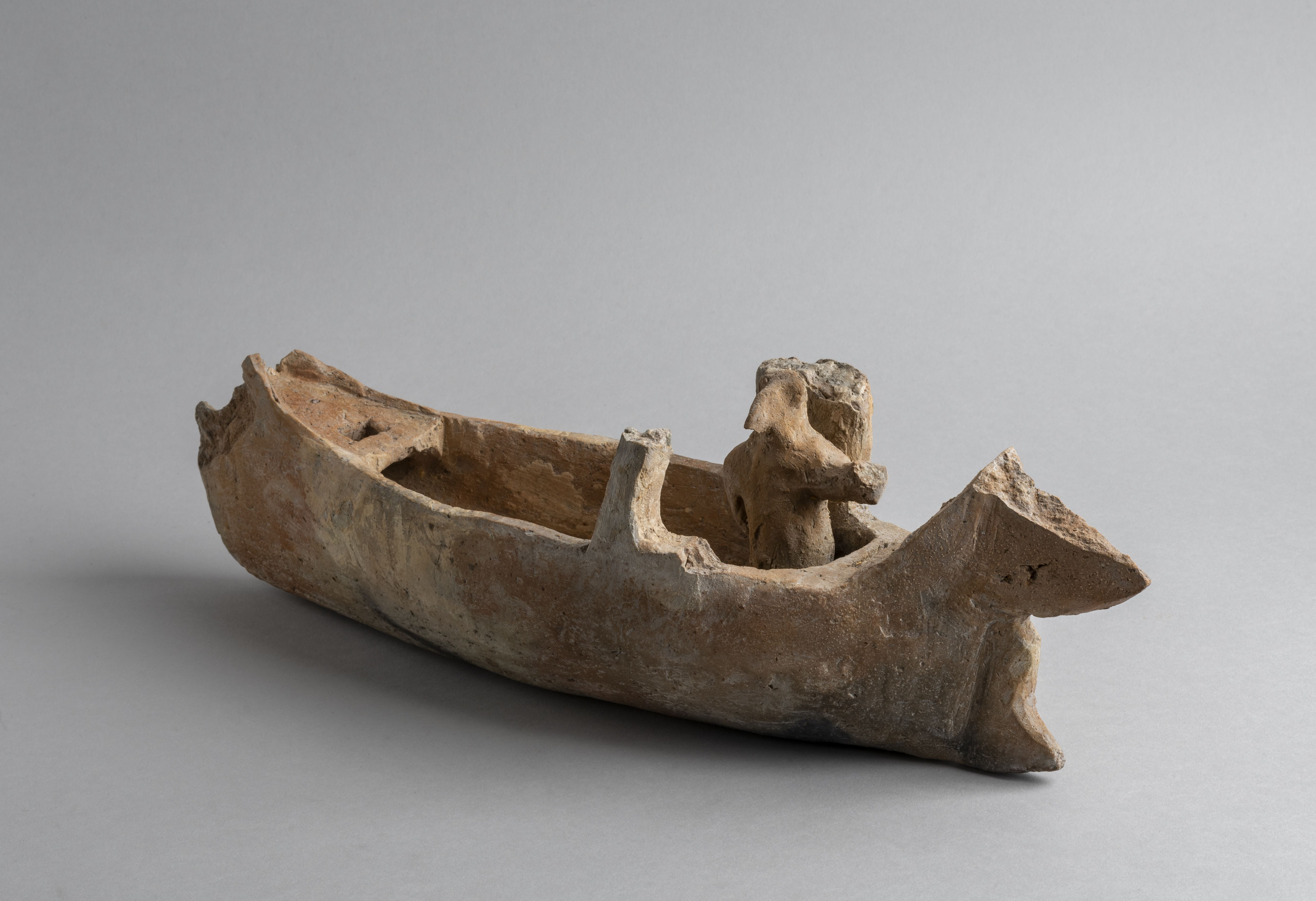
Naqada II clay model of a wooden boat

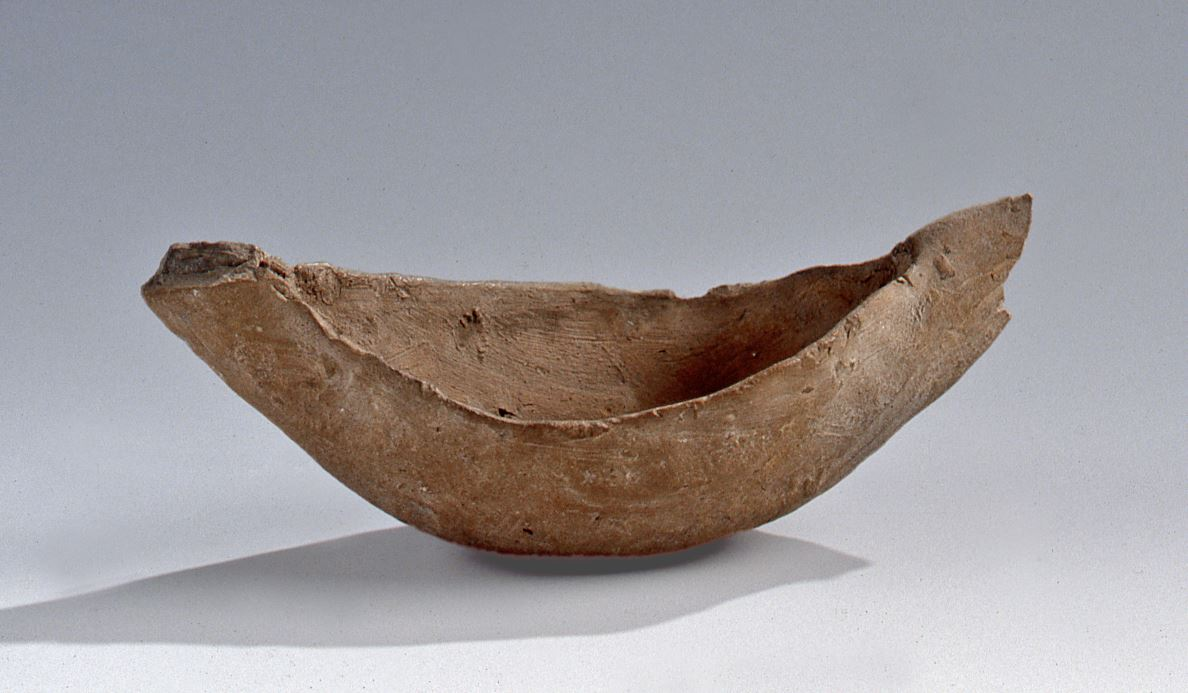
Naqada II clay model of a boat

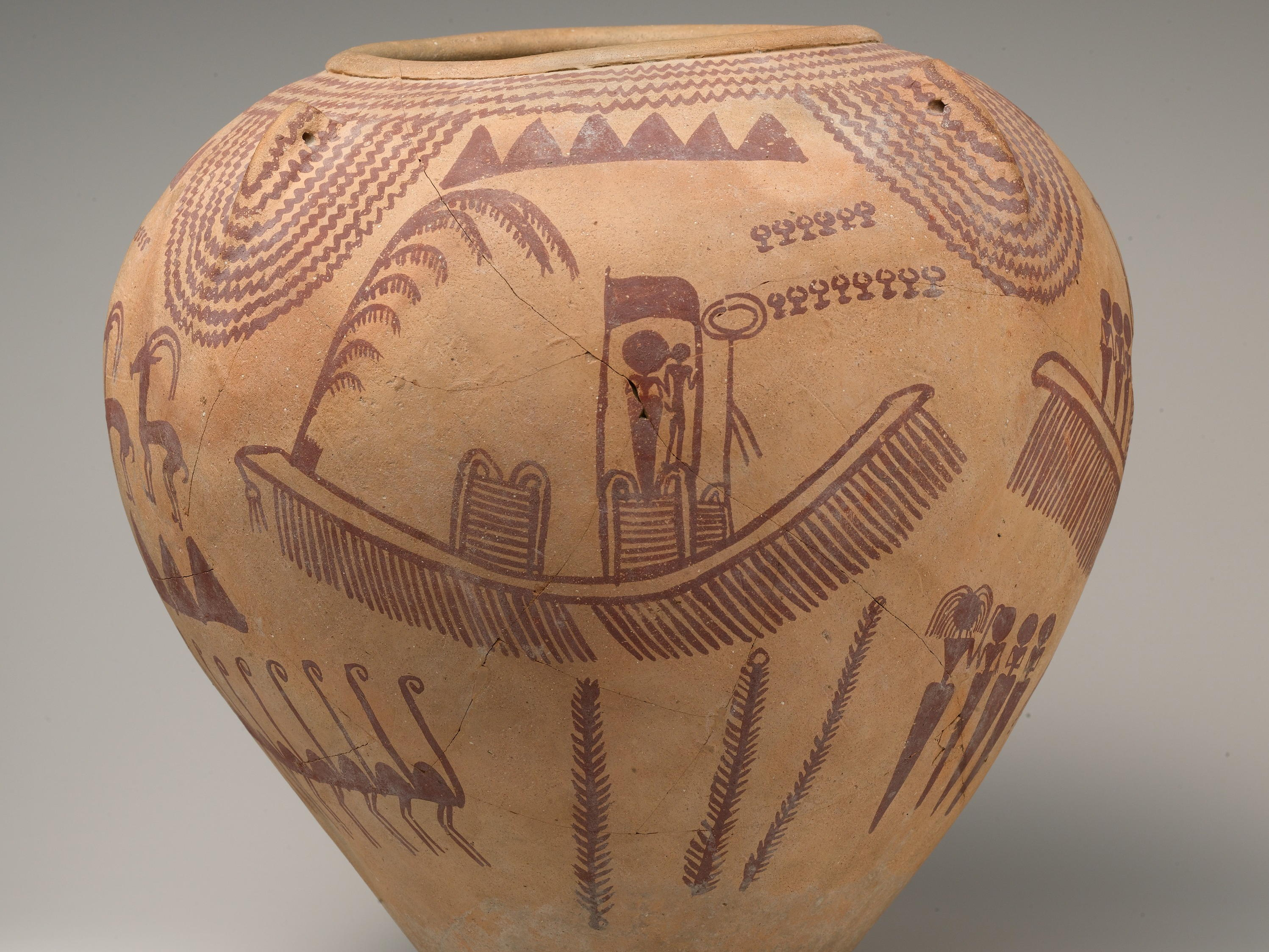
Reed boat on a Naqada II jar

The ancient Egyptians had experience with building a variety of ships. The first Egyptian watercraft were rafts and boats of papyrus. But already from the predynastic Gerzeh culture there are depictions on pottery that rather suggest reed boats as well as clay models that suggest hulls made of planks. Papyrus boats were used from the very beginning until about 1000 CE, when papyrus began to run short. That means there was a co-existence of reed-made and of wooden watercraft lasting more than 4000 years. Papyrus boats were mainly small and were most used in calm shallow waters. The first import of cedar wood from the Lebanon for shipbuilding was reported in the Dynasty IV (2600 BC). Egyptians were the first to build proper ship Hulls by assembling wooden planks. as well as the first Harbor built in Wadi al-Jarf along the red sea coast.

The ancient Egyptians had knowledge to some extent of sail construction. This is governed by the science of aerodynamics. The earliest Egyptian sails were simply placed to catch the wind and push a vessel. Later Egyptian sails dating to 2400 BC were built with the recognition that ships could sail against the wind using the lift of the sails. Queen Hatshepsut oversaw the preparations and funding of an expedition of five ships, each measuring seventy feet long, and with several sails.Various others exist, also.

Pharaonic Egypt and Roman NE Africa

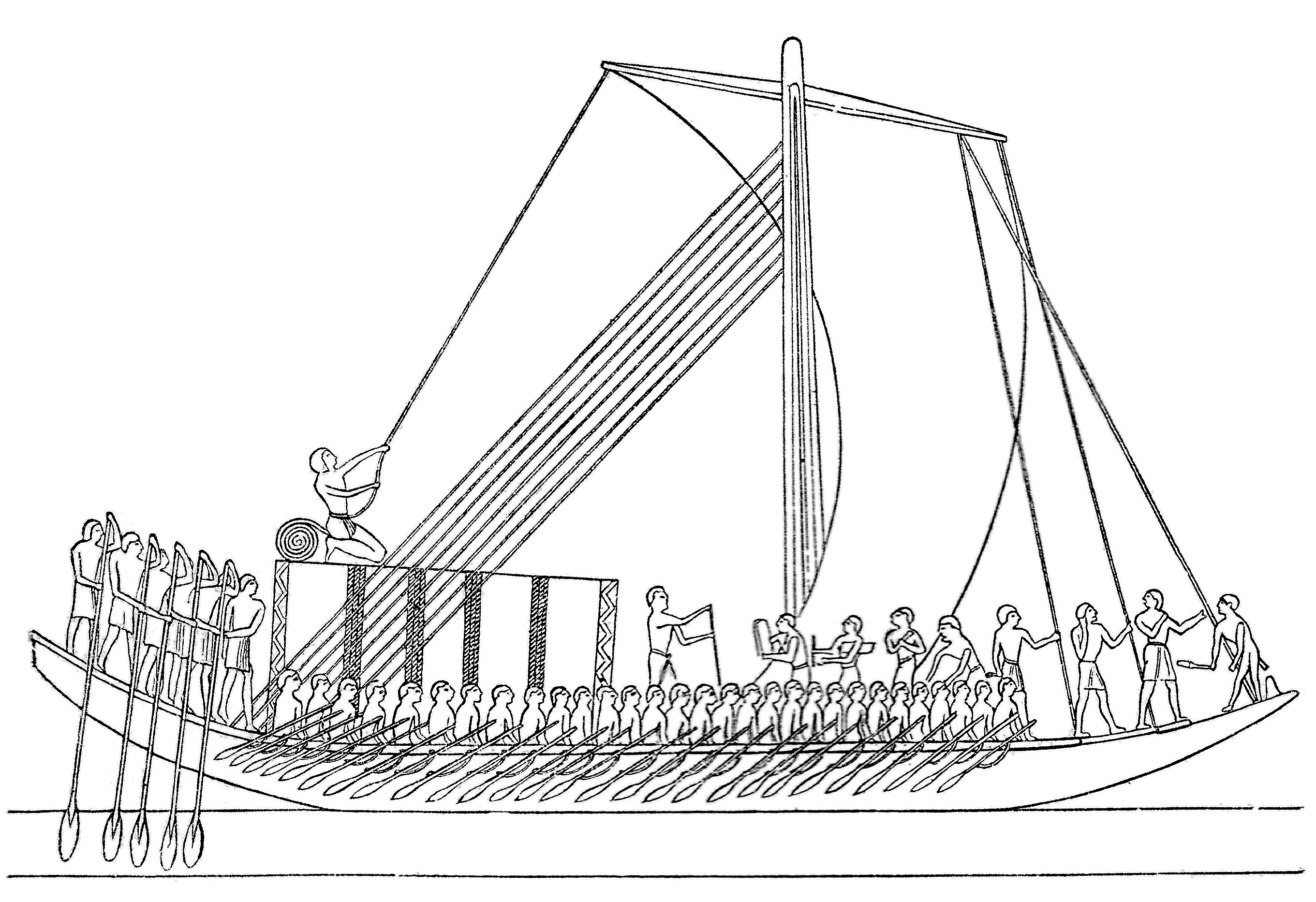
Egyptian ship with a loose-footed sail, similar to a longship. From the 5th dynasty, c. 2700 BC

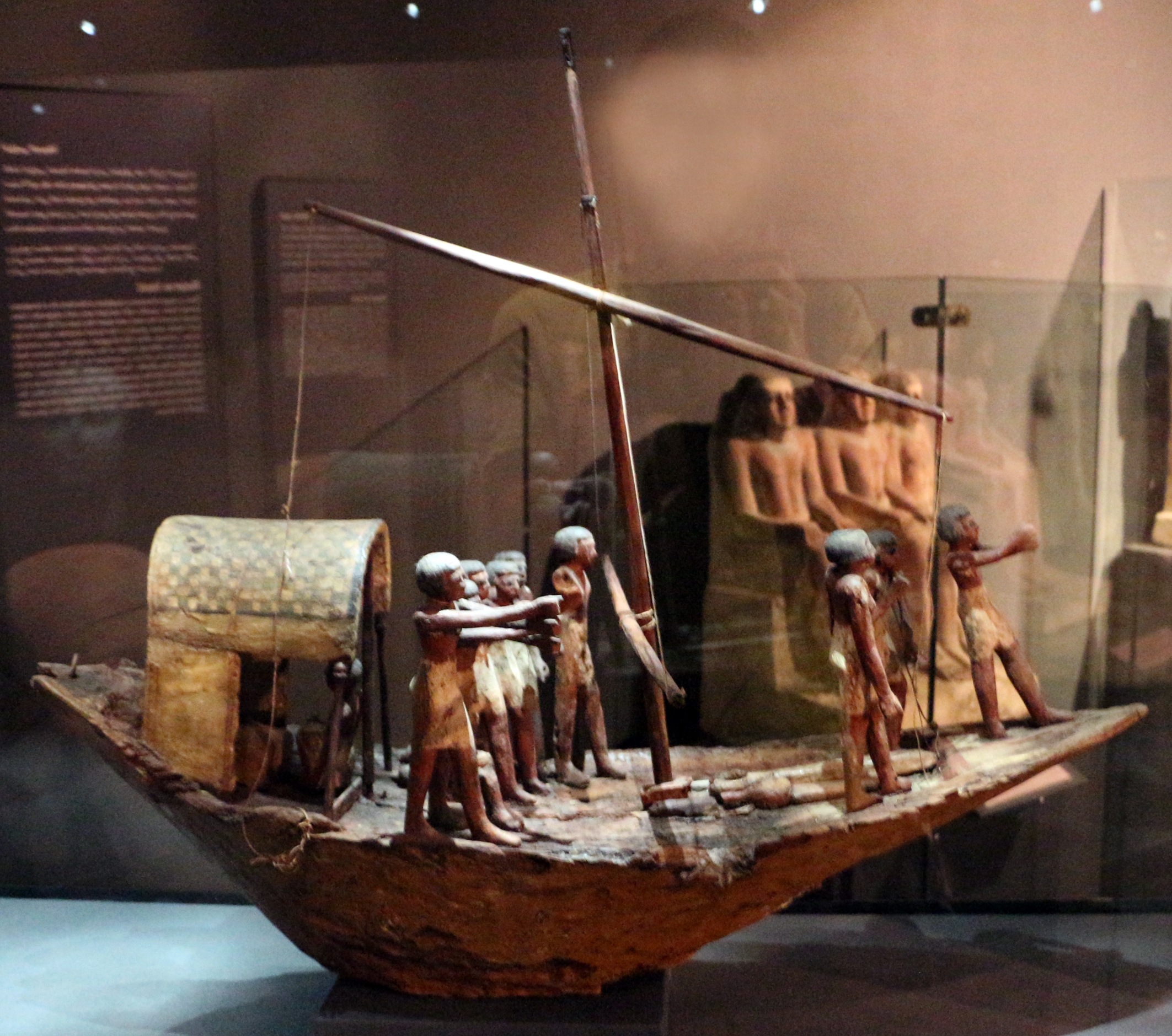
Model ship from the Old Kingdom, c. 2686 – c. 2181 BC

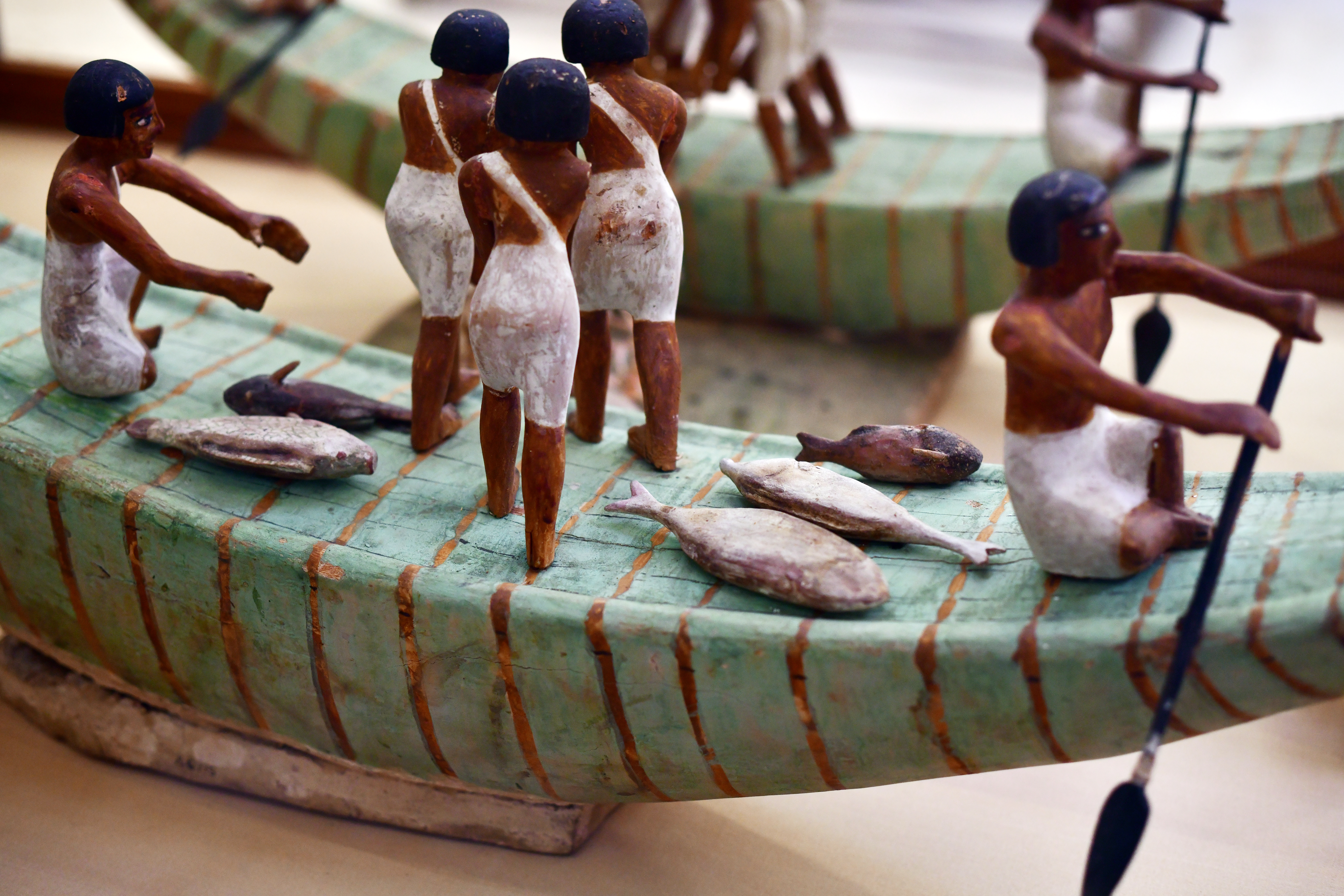
Model of a fishing boat of papyrus, Meketre's tomb, Middle Kingdom, c. 1990 BC

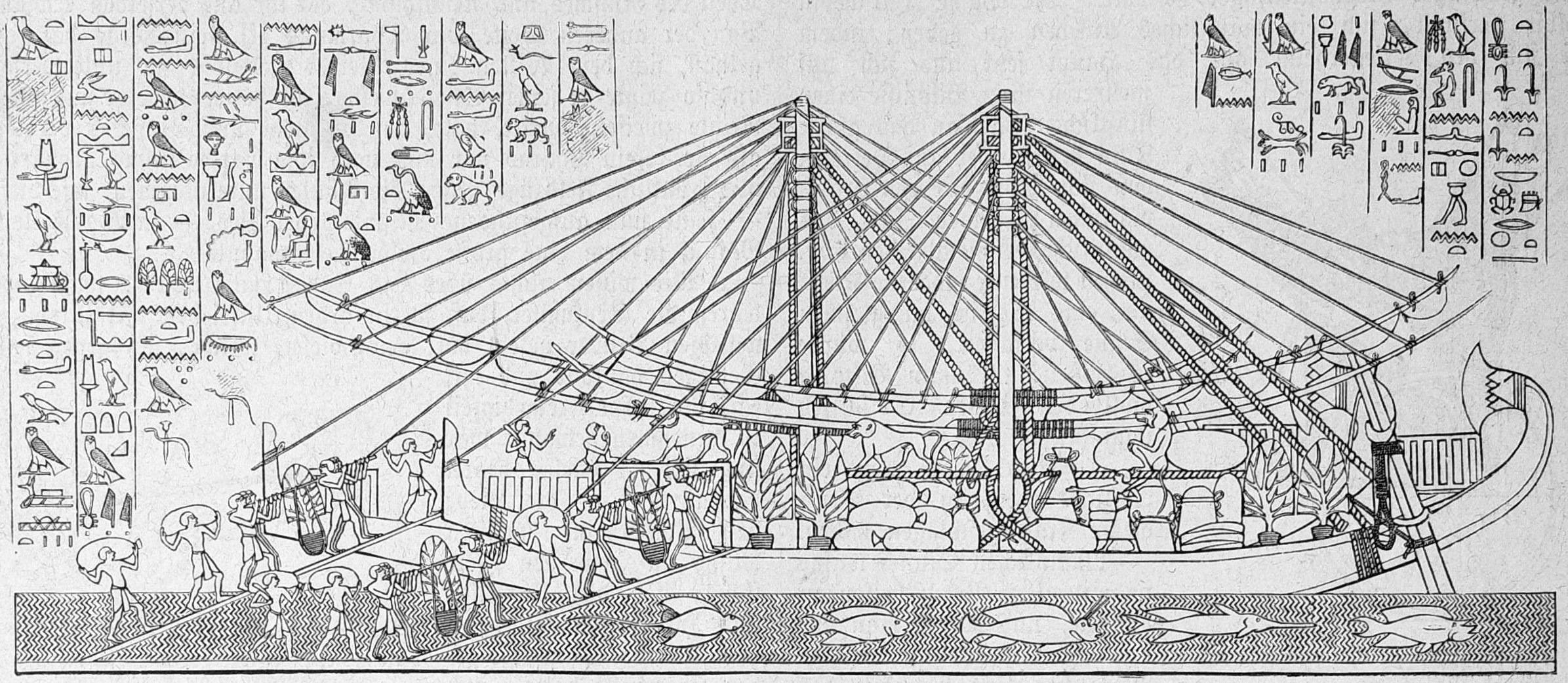
Egyptian vessels being loaded with produce from Punt, possibly rule of Hatshepsut, c. 1479 – c. 1458 BC

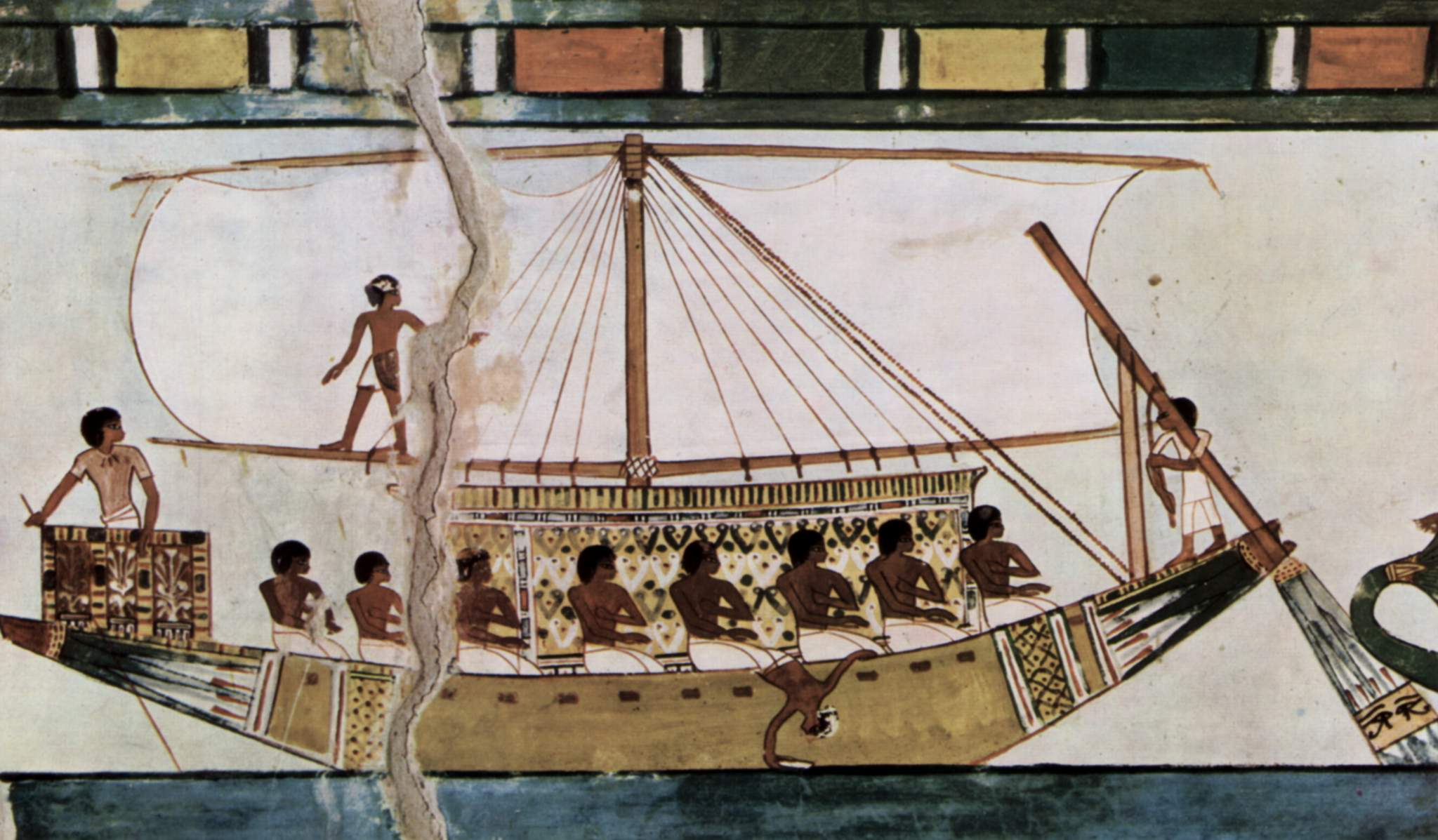
Stern-mounted steering oar of an Egyptian riverboat depicted in the Tomb of Menna, c. 1422 – c. 1411 BC

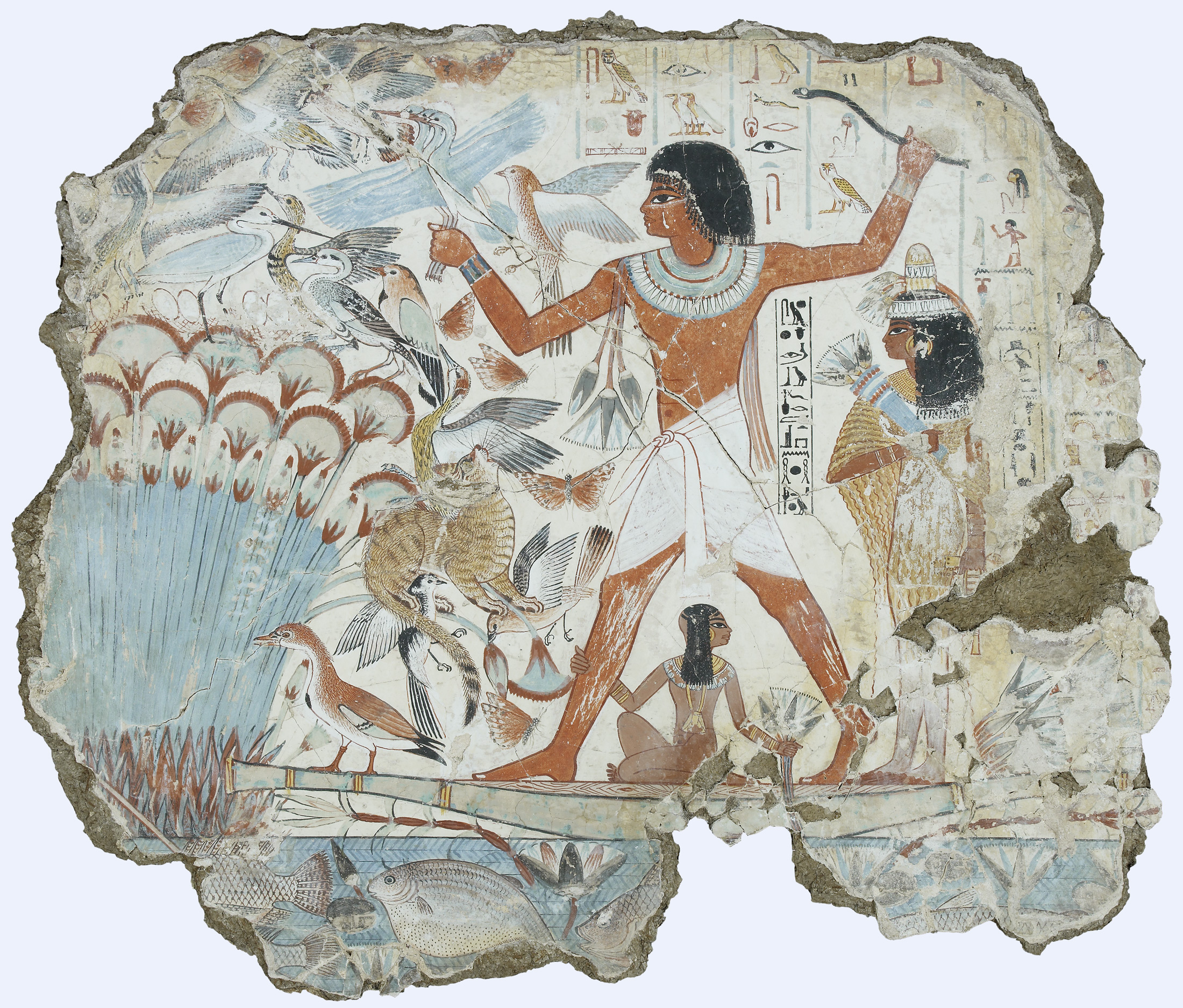
Nebamun standing on a small boat, hunting in the marches, Tomb of Nebamun, c. 1350 BC

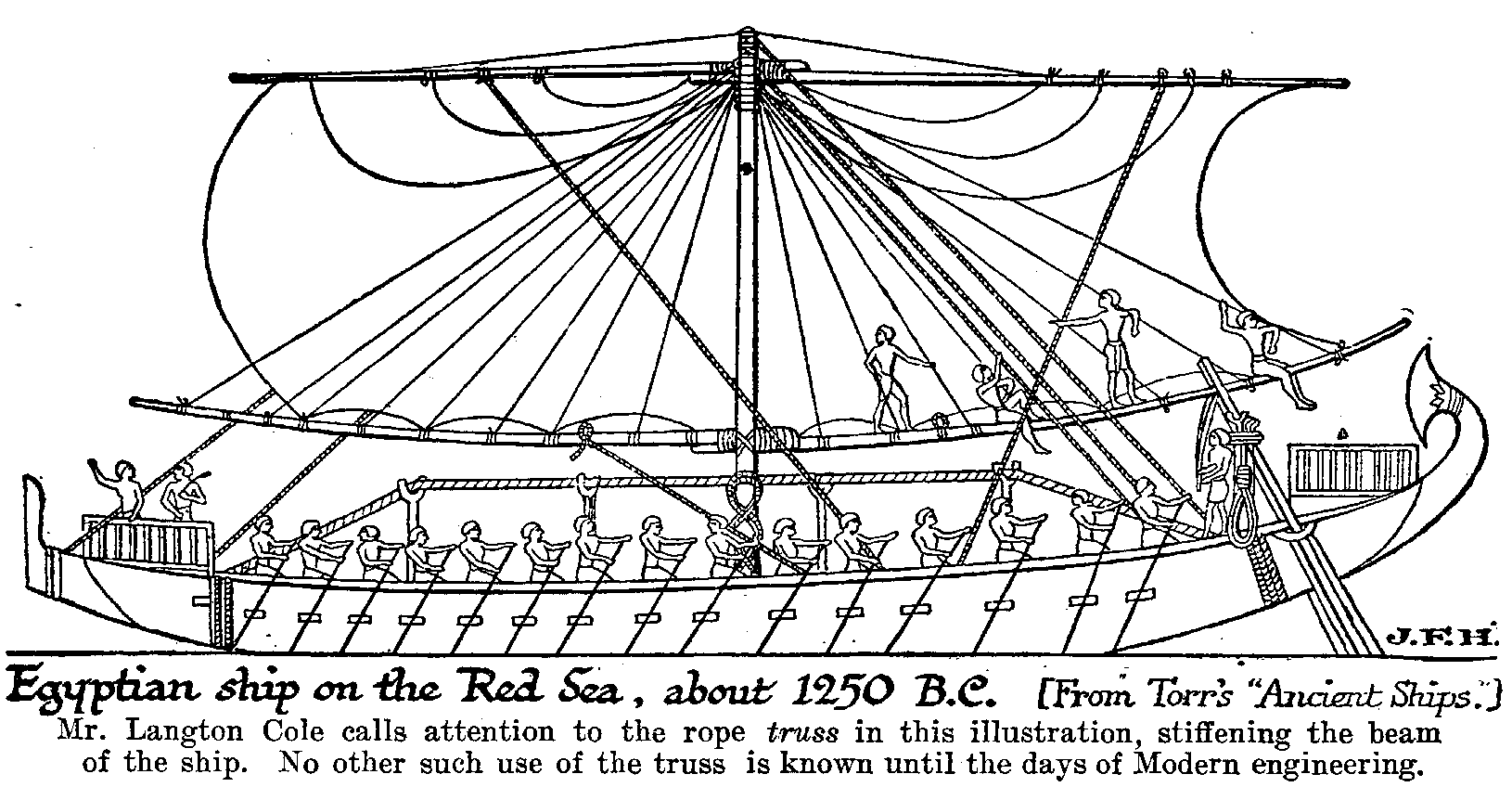
Egyptian ship on the Red Sea, showing a board truss being used to stiffen the beam of this ship, c. 1250 BC

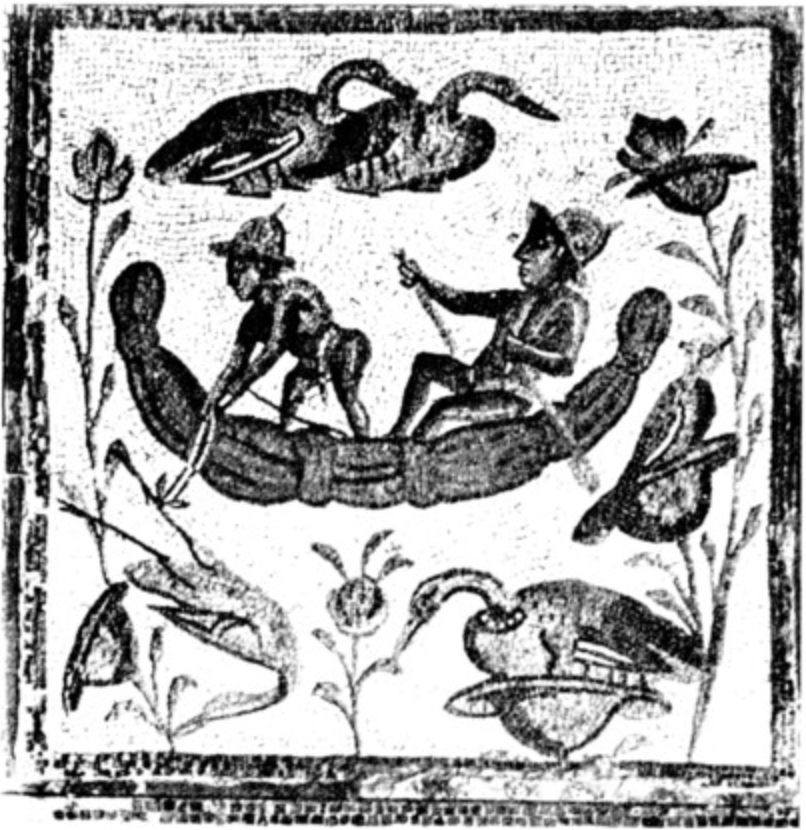
Fishermen in a reed boat, mosaic from Zliten, Libya

A few pharaonic ships have survived to this day, such as Khufu ship. Relics of some ships from the First Dynasty were found nearAbydos, and remnants of other ships were found near the pyramids.

Although quarter rudders were the norm in Nile navigation, the Egyptians were the first to use also stern-mounted rudders (not of the modern type but center mounted steering oars).

The first warships of ancient Egypt were constructed during the early Middle Kingdom and perhaps at the end of the Old Kingdom, but the first mention and a detailed description of a large enough and heavily armed ship dates from 16th century BC.

And I ordered to build twelve warships with rams, dedicated to Amun or Sobek, or Maat and Sekhmet, whose image was crowned best bronze noses. Carport and equipped outside rook over the waters, for many paddlers, having covered rowers deck not only from the side, but and top. and they were on board eighteen oars in two rows on the top and sat on two rowers, and the lower – one, a hundred and eight rowers were. And twelve rowers aft worked on three steering oars. And blocked Our Majesty ship inside three partitions (bulkheads) so as not to drown it by ramming the wicked, and the sailors had time to repair the hole. And Our Majesty arranged four towers for archers – two behind, and two on the nose and one above the other small – on the mast with narrow loopholes. they are covered with bronze in the fifth finger (3.2mm), as well as a canopy roof and its rowers. and they have (carried) on the nose three assault heavy crossbow arrows so they lit resin or oil with a salt of Seth (probably nitrate) tore a special blend and punched (?) lead ball with a lot of holes (?), and one of the same at the stern. and long ship seventy five cubits (41m), and the breadth sixteen, and in battle can go three-quarters of iteru per hour (about 6.5 knots)...

— The text of the tomb of Amenhotep I (KV39).

When Thutmose III achieved warships displacement up to 360 tons and carried up to ten new heavy and light to seventeen catapults based bronze springs, called "siege crossbow" – more precisely, siege bows. There also appeared giant catamarans, heavy warships, by the time of Ramesses III used until the Ptolemaic dynasty.

=== Navigation ===
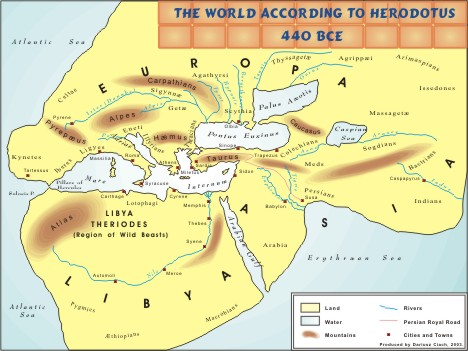
The world according to Herodotus, 440 BC

According to the Greek historian Herodotus, Necho II sent out an expedition of Phoenicians, which reputedly, at some point between 610 and before 594 BC, sailed in three years from the Red Sea around Africa to the mouth of the Nile. Some Egyptologists dispute that an Egyptian pharaoh would authorize such an expedition, except for the reason of trade in the ancient maritime routes.

The belief in Herodotus' account, handed down to him by oral tradition, is primarily because he stated with disbelief that the Phoenicians "as they sailed on a westerly course round the southern end of Libya (Africa), they had the sun on their right – to northward of them" (The Histories 4.42) – in Herodotus' time it was not generally known that Africa was surrounded by an ocean (with the southern part of Africa being thought connected to Asia). So fantastic an assertion is this of a typical example of some seafarers' story and Herodotus therefore may never have mentioned it at all, had it not been based on facts and made with the according insistence.

This early description of Necho's expedition as a whole is contentious, though; it is recommended that one keep an open mind on the subject, but Strabo, Polybius, and Ptolemy doubted the description. Egyptologist A. B. Lloyd suggests that the Greeks at this time understood that anyone going south far enough and then turning west would have the Sun on their right but found it unbelievable that Africa reached so far south. He suggests that "It is extremely unlikely that an Egyptian king would, or could, have acted as Necho is depicted as doing" and that the story might have been triggered by the failure of Sataspes' attempt to circumnavigate Africa under Xerxes the Great. Regardless, it was believed by Herodotus and Pliny.

=== Irrigation and agriculture ===
Irrigation as the artificial application of water to the soil was used to some extent in ancient Egypt, a hydraulic civilization (which entails hydraulic engineering). In crop production it is mainly used to replace missing rainfall in periods of drought, as opposed to reliance on direct rainfall (referred to as dryland farming or as rainfed farming). Before technology advanced, the people of Egypt relied on the natural flow of the Nile River to tend to the crops. Although the Nile provided sufficient watering for the survival of domesticated animals, crops, and the people of Egypt, there were times where the Nile would flood the area wreaking havoc across the land. There is evidence of the ancient Egyptian pharaoh Amenemhet III in the Twelfth Dynasty (about 1800 BC) using the natural lake of the Fayûm as a reservoir to store surpluses of water for use during the dry seasons, as the lake swelled annually with the flooding of the Nile. Construction of drainage canals reduced the problems of major flooding from entering homes and areas of crops; but because it was a hydraulic civilization, much of the water management was controlled in a systematic way. Egyptians also developed the Nilometer to measure the nile's water level and clarity of each year's flood and help forecast the flood's effect on the fields.

=== Glassworking ===
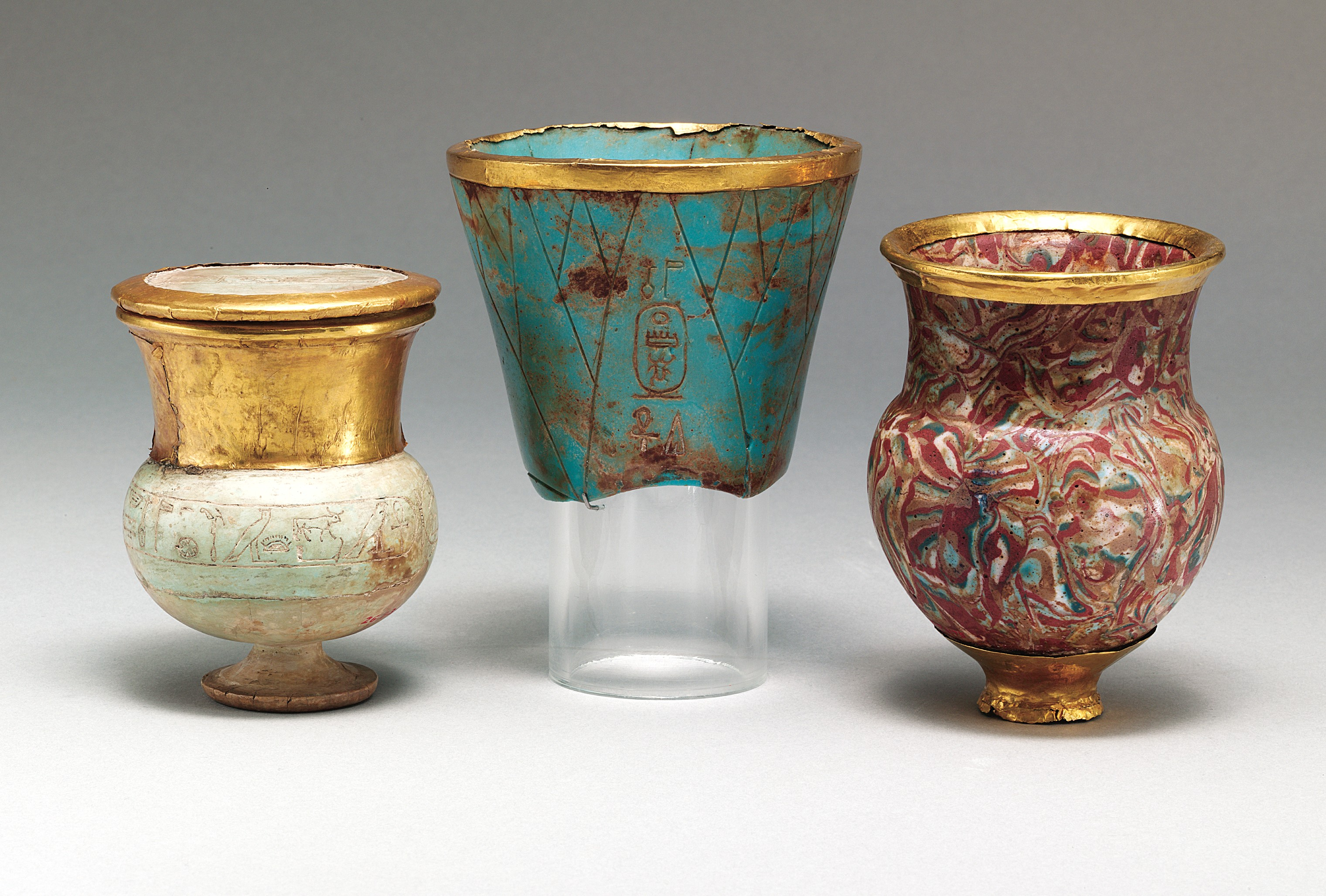
Ancient Egyptian glassware in the Metropolitan Museum of Art

The earliest known glass beads from Egypt were made during the New Kingdom around 1500 BC and were produced in a variety of colors. They were made by winding molten glass around a metal bar and were highly prized as a trading commodity, especially blue beads, which were believed to have magical powers. The Egyptians made small jars and bottles using the core-formed method. Glass threads were wound around a bag of sand tied to a rod. The glass was continually reheated to fuse the threads together. The glass-covered sand bag was kept in motion until the required shape and thickness was achieved. The rod was allowed to cool, then finally the bag was punctured and the sand poured out and reused. The Egyptians also created the first colored glass rods which they used to create colorful beads and decorations. They also worked with cast glass, which was produced by pouring molten glass into a mold, much like iron and the more modern crucible steel. Recent evidence indicates that glassmaking started in Egypt and was later copied by Mesopotamians.

=== Astronomy ===
The Egyptians were a practical people and this is reflected in their astronomy in contrast to Babylonia where the first astronomical texts were written in astrological terms. Even before Upper and Lower Egypt were unified in 3000 BC, observations of the night sky had influenced the development of a religion in which many of its principal deities were heavenly bodies. In Lower Egypt, priests built circular mudbrick walls with which to make a false horizon where they could mark the position of the sun as it rose at dawn, and then with a plumb-bob note the northern or southern turning points (solstices). This allowed them to discover that the sun disc, personified as Ra, took 365 days to travel from his birthplace at the winter solstice and back to it. Meanwhile, in Upper Egypt, a lunar calendar was being developed based on the behavior of the moon and the reappearance of Sirius in its heliacal rising after its annual absence of about 70 days.

After unification, problems with trying to work with two calendars (both depending upon constant observation) led to a merged, simplified civil calendar with twelve 30-day months, three seasons of four months each, plus an extra five days, giving a 365-year day but with no way of accounting for the extra quarter day each year. Day and night were split into 24 units, each personified by a deity. A sundial found on Seti I's cenotaph with instructions for its use shows us that the daylight hours were at one time split into 10 units, with 12 hours for the night and an hour for the morning and evening twilights. However, by Seti I's time day and night were normally divided into 12 hours each, the length of which would vary according to the time of year.

Key to much of this was the motion of the sun god Ra and his annual movement along the horizon at sunrise. Out of Egyptian myths such as those around Ra and the sky goddess Nut came the development of the Egyptian calendar, time keeping, and even concepts of royalty. An astronomical ceiling in the burial chamber of Ramesses VI shows the sun being born from Nut in the morning, traveling along her body during the day and being swallowed at night.

During the Fifth Dynasty six kings built sun temples in honour of Ra. The temple complexes built by Niuserre at Abu Gurab and Userkaf at Abusir have been excavated and have astronomical alignments, and the roofs of some of the buildings could have been used by observers to view the stars, calculate the hours at night and predict the sunrise for religious festivals.

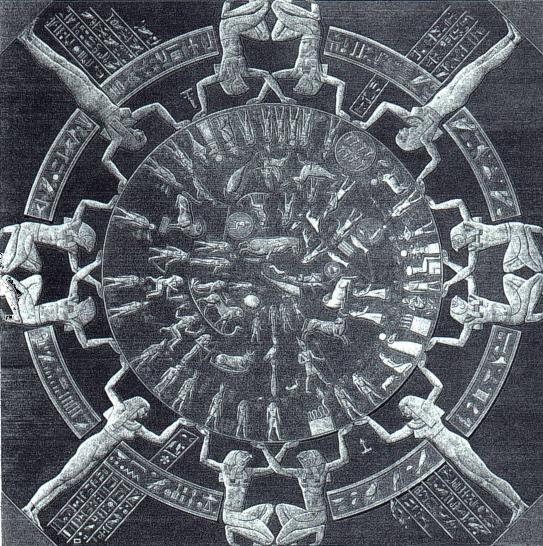
The Dendera Zodiac was on the ceiling of the Greco-Roman temple of Hathor at Dendera

Claims have been made that precession of the equinoxes was known in ancient Egypt prior to the time of Hipparchus. This has been disputed however on the grounds that pre-Hipparchus texts do not mention precession and that "it is only by cunning interpretation of ancient myths and images, which are ostensibly about something else, that precession can be discerned in them, aided by some pretty esoteric numerological speculation involving the 72 years that mark one degree of shift in the zodiacal system and any number of permutations by multiplication, division, and addition."

Note however that the Egyptian observation of a slowly changing stellar alignment over a multi-year period does not necessarily mean that they understood or even cared what was going on. For instance, from the Middle Kingdom onwards they used a table with entries for each month to tell the time of night from the passing of constellations. These went in error after a few centuries because of their calendar and precession, but were copied (with scribal errors) long after they lost their practical usefulness or the possibility of understanding and use of them in the current years, rather than the years in which they were originally used.

=== Medicine ===
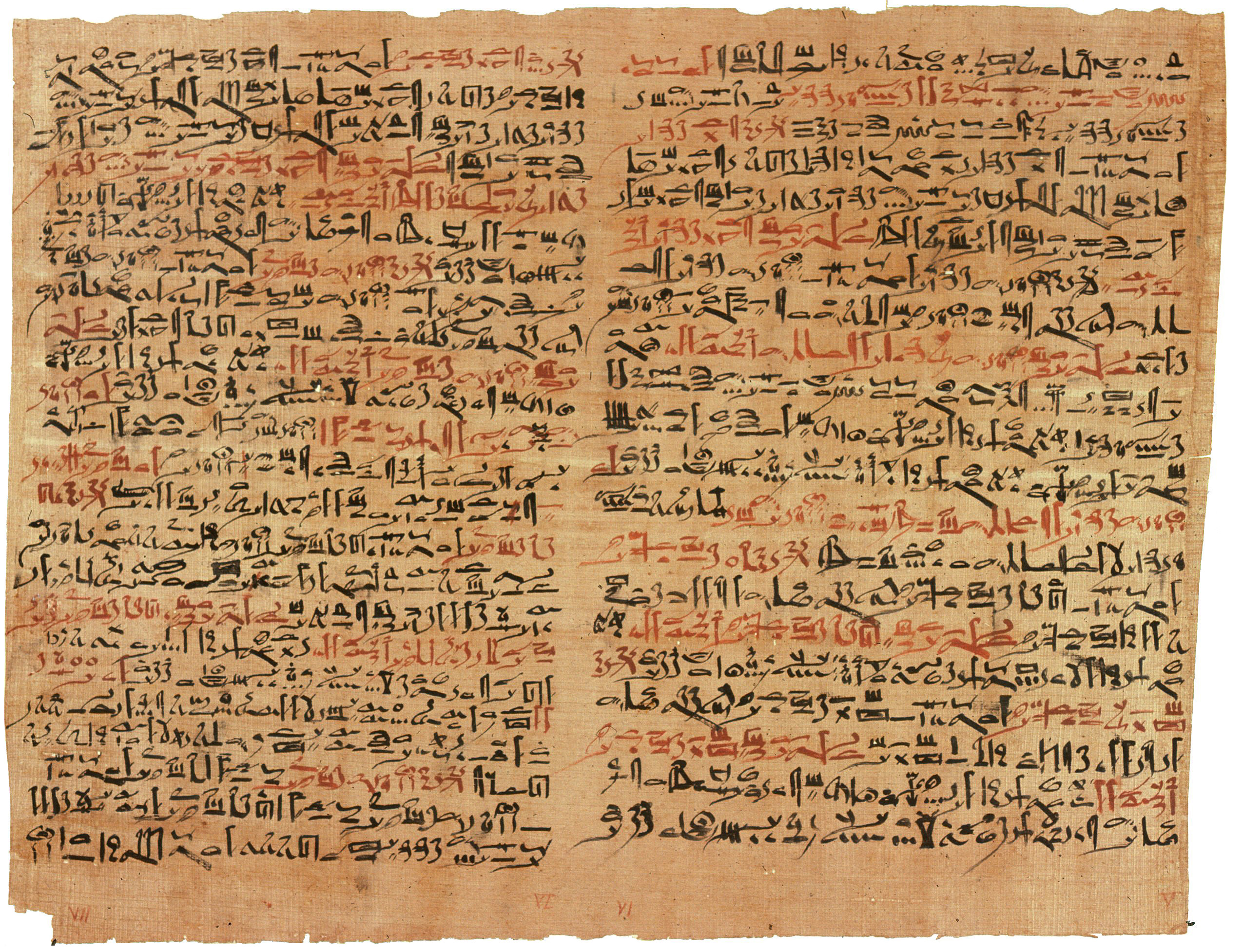
Plates vi & vii of the Edwin Smith Papyrus (around the 17th century BC), among the earliest medical texts

The Edwin Smith Papyrus is one of the first medical documents still extant, and perhaps the earliest document which attempts to describe and analyze the brain: given this, it might be seen as the very beginnings of neuroscience. The rational and practical nature of the papyrus is illustrated in 48 case histories, which are listed according to each organ. The papyrus begins by addressing injuries to the body along with treatments (including Rhinoplasty), detailing injuries in descending anatomical order like a modern anatomical exposition, as well as diagnosing diseases like cancer. The objective examination process included visual and olfactory clues, palpation and taking of the pulse. Following the examination are the diagnosis and prognosis. Among the treatments are closing wounds with sutures, bandaging, splints, poultices, Immobilization is advised for head and spinal cord injuries, as well as other lower body fractures. The papyrus also describes realistic anatomical, physiological and pathological observations. It contains the first known descriptions of the cranial structures, the meninges, the external surface of the brain, the cerebrospinal fluid, and the intracranial pulsations. The procedures of this papyrus demonstrate an Egyptian level of knowledge of medicines that surpassed that of Hippocrates, who lived 1000 years later, and the documented rationale for diagnosis and treatment of spinal injuries can still be regarded as the state-of-the-art reasoning for modern clinical practice. The influence of brain injuries on parts of the body is recognized, such as paralysis. The relationship between the location of a cranial injury and the side of the body affected is also recorded, while crushing injuries of vertebrae were noted to impair motor and sensory functions. Due to its nature, it is believed the papyrus served as a textbook for the trauma from military battles. The papyrus contained the first known study of Anatomy. It described the heart, its vessels, liver, spleen, kidneys, hypothalamus, uterus and bladder, and showed the blood vessels diverging from the heart.

Ebers Papyrus contains The earliest known writings on the Circulatory system. it acknowledges the connection of the heart to the arteries. The Egyptians thought air came in through the mouth and into the lungs and heart. From the heart, the air travelled to every member through the arteries. Although this concept of the circulatory system is only partially correct, it represents one of the earliest accounts of scientific thought.

The earliest known depiction of cataract surgery is on a statue from the Fifth Dynasty of Egypt (2467–2457 BCE). According to Francisco J Ascaso et al, a "relief painting from tomb number TT 217 in a worker settlement in Deir el-Medina" shows "the man buried in the tomb, Ipuy ... one of the builders of royal tombs in the renowned Valley of the Kings, circa 1279–1213 BC" as he underwent cataract surgery. Although direct evidence for cataract surgery in ancient Egypt is lacking, the indirect evidence, including surgical instruments that could have been used for the procedure, show that it was possible. It is assumed that the couching technique was used.

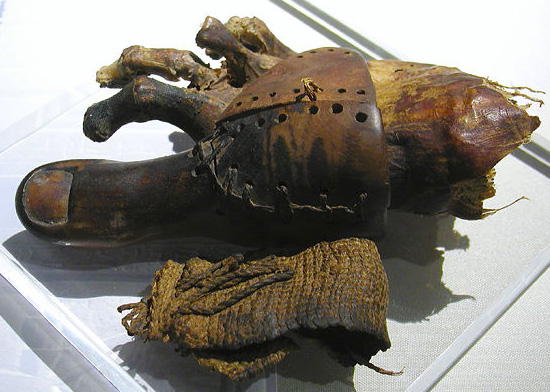
Prosthetic toe from ancient Egypt

The Egyptians were also pioneers of prosthetics, as shown by the wooden toe found on a body from the New Kingdom circa 1000 BC.

However, medical historians believe that ancient Egyptian pharmacology was largely ineffective. According to a paper published by Michael D. Parkins, 72% of 260 medical prescriptions in the Hearst papyrus had no curative elements. According to Michael D. Parkins, sewage pharmacology first began in ancient Egypt and was continued through the Middle Ages, and while the use of animal dung can have curative properties, it is not without its risk. Practices such as applying cow dung to wounds, ear piercing, tattooing, and chronic ear infections were important factors in developing tetanus. Frank J. Snoek wrote that Egyptian medicine used fly specks, lizard blood, swine teeth, and other such remedies which he believes could have been harmful.

Mummification of the dead was not always practiced in Egypt. Once the practice began, an individual was placed at a final resting place through a set of rituals and protocol.

=== Turning devices ===
The earliest evidence for the potter's wheels comes from Canaanite potters living in the Nile Delta, c. 3500 – c. 3300 BC. Egyptians made wheel thrown pottery as early as the 4th Dynasty (c. 2613 – c. 2494 BC). Lathes are known from at least 1300 BC, but Flinders Petrie claimed that they had been used as early as the 4th Dynasty, based on tool marks found on stone bowls from that period.

==== The wheel ====
The wheel existed in Egypt since at least the Fifth Dynasty.

Chariots, however, are only believed to have been introduced by the invasion of the Hyksos in the Second Intermediate Period (c.1650 BC to c.1550 BC); during the New Kingdom era (c.1550 BC to c.1077 BC), chariotry became central to Egypt's military.

=== Other developments ===
The Egyptians developed a variety of furniture. There in the lands of ancient Egypt is the first evidence for stools, beds, and tables (such as from the tombs similar to Tutankhamun's). Recovered ancient Egyptian furniture includes a third millennium BC bed discovered in the Tarkhan Tomb, a c. 2550 BC gilded set from the tomb of Queen Hetepheres I, and a c. 1550 BC stool from Thebes.

Some have suggested that the Egyptians had some form of understanding electric phenomena from observing lightning and interacting with electric fish (such as Malapterurus electricus) or other animals (such as electric eels). The comment about lightning appears to come from a misunderstanding of a text referring to "high poles covered with copper plates" to argue this but Dr. Bolko Stern has written in detail explaining why the copper covered tops of poles (which were lower than the associated pylons) do not relate to electricity or lightning, pointing out that no evidence of anything used to manipulate electricity had been found in Egypt and that this was a magical and not a technical installation.

== Later technology in Egypt ==
=== Greco-Roman Egypt ===
Under Hellenistic rule, Egypt was one of the most prosperous regions of the Hellenistic civilization. The ancient Egyptian city of Rhakotis was renovated as Alexandria, which became the largest city around the Mediterranean Basin. Under Roman rule, Egypt was one of the most prosperous regions of the Roman Empire, with Alexandria being second only to ancient Rome in size.

Recent scholarship suggests that the water wheel originates from Ptolemaic Egypt, where it appeared by the 3rd century BC. This is seen as an evolution of the paddle-driven water-lifting wheels that had been known in Egypt a century earlier. According to John Peter Oleson, both the compartmented wheel and the hydraulic noria may have been invented in Egypt by the 4th century BC, with the Sakia being invented there a century later. This is supported by archeological finds at Faiyum, Egypt, where the oldest archeological evidence of a water-wheel has been found, in the form of a Sakia dating back to the 3rd century BC. A papyrus dating to the 2nd century BC also found in Faiyum mentions a water wheel used for irrigation, a 2nd-century BC fresco found at Alexandria depicts a compartmented Sakia, and the writings of Callixenus of Rhodes mention the use of a Sakia in Ptolemaic Egypt during the reign of Ptolemy IV in the late 3rd century BC.

Ancient Greek technology was often inspired by the need to improve weapons and tactics in war. Ancient Roman technology is a set of artifacts and customs which supported Roman civilization and made the expansion of Roman commerce and Roman military possible over nearly a thousand years.

=== Arabic-Islamic Egypt ===
Under Arab rule, Egypt once again became one of the most prosperous regions around the Mediterranean. The Egyptian city of Cairo was founded by the Fatimid Caliphate and served as its capital city. At the time, Cairo was second only to Baghdad, capital of the rival Abbasid Caliphate. After the fall of Baghdad, however, Cairo overtook it as the largest city in the Mediterranean region until the early modern period.

Inventions in medieval Islam covers the inventions developed in the medieval Islamic world, a region that extended from Al-Andalus and Africa in the west to the Indian subcontinent and Central Asia in the east. The timeline of Islamic science and engineering covers the general development of science and technology in the Islamic world.

== See also ==
- List of Egyptian inventions and discoveries
- Ancient Egyptian units of measurement
- Egyptian chronology
- History of science in early cultures
- Astrology and astronomy
- History of technology
