= Sataspes =

Persian navigator and commander (fifth century BC)

Sataspes was a Persian nobleman and navigator who attempted to circumnavigate Africa during the reign of the Persian King Xerxes I. his name translates from Persian as 'hundred horses'.

Sataspes, first cousin of Xerxes I, had been condemned to death for kidnapping and raping the daughter of Megabyzus. The King sentenced him to death by impaling, however, his mother, Xerxes' aunt Atossa, convinced the King to instead spare his life so long as he circumnavigated Africa. He took an Egyptian ship and crew, sailed through the Pillars of Hercules, and proceeded south, but returned to Egypt without successfully completing his task.

Sataspes claimed that at the furthest point of his voyage, he had reached 'the coast occupied by small men, who wore clothes made from palm leaves', and was forced to return because his ship was stopped and couldn't sail any further. Xerxes did not accept this excuse and had him impaled.
