= John Peter Oleson =

Classical archaeologist and historian of ancient technology

- Born: 1946 (age 79–80); Hackensack, New Jersey, United States
- Education: Harvard University
- Scientific career
- Fields: Classical archaeologist, historian of technology
- Workplaces: University of Victoria

John Peter Oleson (born 1946) is a Canadian classical archaeologist and historian of ancient technology. His main interests are the Roman Near East, maritime archaeology (particularly Roman harbours), and ancient technology, especially hydraulic technology, water-lifting devices, and Roman concrete construction.

== Life ==
Born in 1946 in Hackensack, New Jersey, United States, Oleson was schooled at the Loomis School in Windsor, Connecticut (1960–64). He received his BA in Classics at Harvard University in 1967, where he studied with Herbert Bloch. Oleson received his MA (1971) and PhD (1973) in Classical Archaeology at Harvard University, working in particular with George M.A. Hanfmann and David Mitten.

From 1973–1976 Oleson taught in the Classics Department of Florida State University, Tallahassee. Since 1976 he has been a member of the Greek and Roman Studies Department of the University of Victoria, Canada, where he was appointed Distinguished Professor in 2003. He was elected a Fellow of the Royal Society of Canada in 1994. From 1997 to 2001 he was a member of Council of the Social Sciences and Humanities Research Council of Canada. From 1999–2002 he was a Trustee of the Board of the Royal British Columbia Museum. He was appointed a Killam Research Fellow for 2000–2002. Since 1997 he has been a member of the Board of the American Center of Research in Amman.

Between 1970 and 1975 Oleson worked with Anna McCann Taggart on the archaeological excavation of the Etruscan and Roman harbours at Cosa, Pyrgi, and Populonia, and from 1980 to 1985 he was a co-director of the Caesarea Ancient Harbour Excavation Project. In 1997, along with McCann Taggart, he was a project archaeologist at the Skerki Bank Deep Water Shipwreck Survey, directed by Robert Ballard. From 1986 until 2005 he directed survey and excavation at the site of Hawara (modern Humayma), a Nabataean, Roman, and Early Islamic centre in the Hisma Desert of southern Jordan. Since 2001 he has co-directed the Roman Maritime Concrete Study with Christopher J. Brandon and Robert L. Hohlfelder.

As of 2010 Oleson has published ten books and more than 95 articles concerning ancient technology, marine archaeology, the Nabataeans, and the Roman Near East. He has presented more than 150 refereed public papers and invited lectures since 1976. Oleson has also been active as an editor: His Handbook of Engineering and Technology in the Classical World was awarded the Eugene Ferguson book award by the Society for the History of Technology in 2009. In 2010 the Royal Society of Canada awarded Oleson the Pierre Chauveau Medal for "distinguished contribution to knowledge in the humanities."

== Works ==
- Sources of Innovation in Later Etruscan Tomb Design, Rome: Giorgio Bretschneider Editore, 1982, ISBN 88-85007-67-8
- Greek and Roman Mechanical Water-Lifting Devices: The History of a Technology, Phoenix, supplementary Vol. 16, Toronto: University of Toronto Press, 1984, ISSN 0079-1784
- Bronze Age, Greek and Roman Technology: A Select, Annotated Bibliography, New York: Garland Publishing, 1986, ISBN 0-8240-8677-5
- The Roman Port and Fishery of Cosa, Princeton: Princeton University Press, 1987 (co-author), ISBN 0-691-03581-4
- The Harbours of Caesarea Maritima. Vol. 1: The Site and the Excavations, BAR International Series, supplement 491, 1989 (editor and co-author), ISBN 0-86054-628-4
- The Harbours of Caesarea Maritima. Vol. 2: The Finds and the Ship, BAR International Series, supplement 594, 1994 (editor and co-author), ISBN 0-86054-768-X
- Classical Views/Echos du monde classique, Vols. 30 to 37 (1986 to 1994) (co-editor), ISSN 0012-9356
- Greek and Roman Technology: A Sourcebook, London: Routledge, 1997 (co-author), ISBN 0-415-06136-9
- Deep-Water Shipwrecks off Skerki Bank: The 1997 Survey, Journal of Roman Archaeology, supplement 58, 2004 (co-author), ISBN 1-887829-58-X
- Handbook of Engineering and Technology in the Classical World, New York: Oxford University Press, 2008 (editor), ISBN 978-0-19-973485-6 (corrected, paperbound edition 2010)
- Humayma Excavation Project, 1: Resources, History and the Water-Supply System, ASOR Archaeological Reports, Vol. 15, 2010, ISBN 978-0-89757-083-1
- Humayma Excavation Project, 2: Nabatean Campground and Necropolis, Byzantine Churches, and Early Islamic Structures, ASOR Archaeological Reports, Vol. 18, 2013 (co-author), ISBN 978-0-89757-037-4
- Building for Eternity. The History and Technology of Roman Concrete Engineering in the Sea., Oxford: Oxbow Books, 2014 (co-author), ISBN 978-1-78297-420-8

== See also ==
- Ancient Greek technology – Tools and weapons used in Ancient Greece
- Roman technology – Technological accomplishments of the ancient Roman civilization
