= Ahmed Said =

Ahmed Said or Ahmad Said may refer to:

- Ahmad Said (politician), Malay politician and member of the Legislative Assembly
- Ahmed Hassan Said, Egyptian businessman
- Ahmed Said (cricketer), Pakistani cricketer
- Ahmed Said (footballer), Egyptian football player
- Ahmed Said (swimmer), Egyptian swimmer
- Ahmed Said (broadcaster), director and announcer of Voice of the Arabs, 1953-1967
- Ahmed Hassan Said, Egyptian politician
- Ahmed Said Musa Patel, first Imam and Muslim cleric in New Zealand

== See also ==
- Ahmed Saad (disambiguation)
- Abdulkadir Ahmed Said, Somali film director, producer, screenwriter, cinematographer and editor
- Djaffar Ahmed Said, administrator in Comoros
- Mohammed Ahmed Said Haidel, citizen of Yemen, who was held in extrajudicial detention in the United States Guantanamo Bay detention camps, in Cuba
- Said Ahmed Said, Ghanaian-Italian football player
