= Fatma Said =

Egyptian operatic soprano

- Born: Fatma Ahmed Hassan Said; 1991 (age 34–35); Cairo, Egypt
- Citizenship: Egyptian
- Education: Hochschule für Musik Hanns Eisler Berlin (BMus, MMus)
- Alma mater: Accademia Teatro alla Scala
- Occupation: Opera singer Soprano
- Agent: Askonas Holt
- Parents: Ahmed Hassan Said (father); Nivert El Sherif (mother)
- Relatives: Taha Hussein (great-great uncle)
- Website: fatmasaid.com

Fatma Said (born Fatma Ahmed Hassan Said; 1991) is an Egyptian operatic soprano based in London and Berlin.

== Life ==
Fatma Said was born and raised in Cairo, where she attended the Deutsche Schule der Borromäerinnen Kairo. Her father, Ahmed Hassan Said, was the first president of the Free Egyptians Party founded during the 2011 Egyptian revolution.

Said's early focus was tennis, but following the recommendation of her school choir teacher she received her first singing lessons at the age of 14 with Egyptian-French soprano Névine Allouba. In 2009 she was accepted to study classical singing at the Hochschule für Musik Hanns Eisler Berlin where she received her Bachelor of Music in 2013 and Master of Music in 2018 under Prof. Renate Faltin. She then received a scholarship at the Opera Academy of La Scala in Milan, becoming the first Egyptian soprano to ever sing at La Scala. In 2016 she was seen as Pamina in Peter Stein's production of The Magic Flute at La Scala in Milan.

She has appeared on many international stages, including the Teatro San Carlo (Naples), Staatsoper Hamburg, Royal Opera House Muscat, Wexford Opera in Ireland, Gewandhaus in Leipzig, Vienna Konzerthaus, Royal Albert Hall, and Carnegie Hall. She played roles in the operas Falstaff, L'enfant et les sortilèges, La Cenerentola and The Barber of Seville. She sang at many well-known festivals such as the International Music Festival in Bad Kissingen, the Schumann Festival in Bonn and the 9th and 10th D-Marine Turgutreis International Classical Music Festival in Turkey. She was an artist-in-residence at the Konzerthaus Berlin in 2022/23. Said is also known for her social commitment. At TEDxCairo in 2011, she sang “The Day the People Changed”, a new song she participated in composing about the Egyptian revolution. In 2013, she worked with composer Eugenio Bennato at the Teatro San Carlo on an educational project about the Arab Spring. She represented Egypt on Human Rights Day several times and appeared at the United Nations in Geneva together with Juan Diego Flórez where she committed herself to the musical education of children and young people. In 2016 she was the first opera singer to receive the Creativity Award from Egypt. She was also honored by the National Council for Women that same year. On 25 September 2021 she performed at Global Citizen Live in Paris, along with Elton John, Ed Sheeran, and other well known stars. In 2023, Fatma Said accompanied by the United Philharmonic Orchestra led by Conductor Nader Abbassi held a concert in newly opened Grand Egyptian Museum. A number of public figures and foreign ambassadors attended the concert where she performed songs in Arabic and Egyptian dialect such as a delightful rendition of "Masr Heya Ommi" receiving more than 2 million views on her YouTube channel.

== Awards ==
- First Prize in the German Young Musicians’ Competition Jugend musiziert, 2006 and 2009
- Winner of the Grand Prix of the 1st International Giulio Perotti Singing Competition, 5-11 February 2011 in Ueckermünde
- 2nd prize and silver medal at the XVI. Robert Schumann International Competition for Pianists and Singers in Zwickau 2012
- 1st Prize and Doğuş Audience Prize at the Leyla Gencer International Opera Competition in Istanbul 2012
- Egyptian State Creativity Award 2016
- 1st prize at the 8th Veronica Dunne International Singing Competition in Dublin 2016
- Honorary Award of the National Council for Women in Egypt 2016
- One of 2016's BBC Radio 3 New Generation Artists
- 2021 BBC Music Magazine Newcomer of the Year and Vocal Award for her debut album, El Nour
- 2021 OPUS Klassik Young artist (vocals)]
- 2021 Gramophone Classical Music Award for Best Song Album, Young Artist of the Year
- 2023 Rafik Hariri Award for Artistic Excellence

== Discography ==
- 2017: Wolfgang Amadeus Mozart: The Magic Flute. From La Scala in Milan with Fatma Said as Pamina, directed by Peter Stein, conducted by Ádám Fischer. DVD / Blu-ray released by CMajor.
- 2018: Christoph Willibald Gluck: Orfeo ed Euridice. From La Scala in Milan with Fatma Said as Amour, directed by John Fulljames and Hofesh Shechter, conducted by Michele Mariotti. DVD / Blu-ray released by Belvedere.
- 2020: Fatma Said – El Nour. (Warner Classics, originally released: 16 October 2020) French, Spanish and Arabic songs. Featuring Malcolm Martineau (piano), Rafael Aguirre Miñarro (guitar), Burcu Karadag (nay), Tim Allhoff (piano) and the vision string quartet.
- 2021: Featured on Jakub Józef Orliński's Anima Aeterna (Warner Classics, released 29 October 2021).
- 2022: Kaleidoscope – Fatma Said. (Warner Classics, released: 2 September 2022) Featuring Tim Allhoff (piano), Christian Gerber (Musiker) (bandoneon), Marianne Crebassa (mezzo-soprano), Lucienne Renaudin Vary (trumpet), vision string quartet, Quinteto Angel, Henning Sieverts (bass), Monte-Carlo Philharmonic Orchestra, and Sascha Goetzel (conductor).
- Lieder. Released: 7 February 2025
