= Ahmed Saad =

Ahmed Saad may refer to:

- Ahmed Saad (Australian footballer) (born 1989), Australian rules footballer
- Ahmed Saad Osman (born 1979), Libyan footballer
- Ahmed Saad (weightlifter), Egyptian weightlifter
- Ahmed Saad Al-Azhari, Islamic scholar
- Ahmed Saad (singer), Egyptian singer

== See also ==
- Ahmed Said (disambiguation)
