= Essam Khalil (politician) =

Egyptian businessman and politician

- عصام خليل

Chairman of the Free Egyptians Party
- Incumbent
- Assumed office December 2015
- Preceded by: Ahmed Hassan Said

Personal details
- Born: 1948 (age 77–78)
- Party: Free Egyptians Party
- Profession: Businessman

Essam Khalil is an Egyptian businessman who was one of the founders of the Free Egyptians Party (FEP).

The party was founded in April 2011 and is backed by leading business, political, and cultural leaders. FEP supports the principles of a liberal, democratic, and secular political order in post-Mubarak Egypt.

== Personal life ==
He was born in 1948.

== Career ==
Khalil was the second chairman of the Free Egyptians Party and succeeded Ahmed Hassan Said, defeating Mohamed El-Bailey in a December 2015 election; Khalil had served as the acting president since 2014. He was re-elected in March 2017.

President Abdel Fattah el-Sisi appointed Khalil to be a member of the Egyptian Senate in October 2025.
