= Grand Egyptian Museum =

Archaeological museum in Giza, Egypt

Grand Egyptian Museum المتحف المصري الكبير

- Entrance to the Grand Egyptian Museum
- Established: 1 November 2025; 12 months ago
- Location: Giza, Egypt
- Coordinates: 29.9950°N 31.1193°E
- Type: Archaeology museum, history museum
- Collection size: Over 100,000
- Visitors: 19,000 daily
- Director: Ahmed Ghoneim
- Architects: Róisín Heneghan; Shih-Fu Peng
- Public transit access: Cairo Metro Line 4, Pyramids Station (under construction)
- Website: gem.eg

The Grand Egyptian Museum (GEM; Arabic: المتحف المصري الكبير, romanized: al-Matḥaf al-Miṣriyy al-Kabir) is a national archaeological museum in Giza, Egypt. Dedicated to Egyptian civilization and its culture, society, and artifacts, the GEM is the largest museum in the world for a single civilization.

Located about 2 kilometres (1.2 mi) from the Giza Pyramid complex, the museum houses a collection of Egyptian artifacts from various periods of Egyptian civilization, from the Predynastic Period to Late antiquity. There are an estimated total of over 100,000 artifacts, including at least 20,000 that were displayed for the first time ever, such as the complete King Tutankhamun collection comprising 5,398 pieces, on display in a 7,500 m^{2} (81,000 ft^{2}) section of the museum. Some newly-restored pieces will be displayed for the first time, such as the second solar ship of Khufu, the collection of Queen Hetepheres (mother of King Khufu), and the collection of Yuya and Thuya (parents of Queen Tiye).

The museum covers a total area of 500,000 m^{2} (5,400,000 ft^{2}), with a built-up area of 167,000 m^{2} (1,800,000 ft^{2}) and floor area of 81,000 m^{2} (870,000 ft^{2}). It will also host permanent exhibition galleries, temporary exhibitions, special exhibitions, a children's museum, and virtual and large-format screens with a total floor area of 32,000 m^{2} (340,000 ft^{2}). The GEM was first announced in 1992, actual construction began in 2005, and it was fully completed in 2023 at a cost of $1.2 billion. Trial opening began in October 2024, and the official opening took place on 1 November 2025. The museum was built by a joint venture of Egyptian Orascom Construction and the Belgian BESIX Group.

== History ==
The Grand Egyptian Museum concept originated in the early 1990s with Farouk Hosni, who served as Minister of Culture from 1987 to 2011. According to Hosni, the Egyptian Museum in Tahrir had become old-fashioned and "Every time I visited the museum it gave me headaches and depression and its restoration was a disaster".

The project was officially launched by the government in 1992 under President Hosni Mubarak, who announced plans to build a new museum to house a larger collection of artifacts and to consolidate ancient treasures. In 2002, the foundation stone for the project was laid, and in 2005 the actual construction work began.

=== Opening and postponement ===
The Grand Egyptian Museum's opening has been postponed several times:

- 2020–2021: The Grand Egyptian Museum was scheduled to open in 2020, but was postponed to 2021 due to the COVID-19 pandemic, which impacted preparations and logistics.
- 2021–2023: After postponing its opening from 2020 to the last quarter of 2021 due to the COVID-19 pandemic, the Grand Egyptian Museum faced additional delays due to ongoing logistical challenges, including the completion of construction work, the transportation of artifacts, and preparations for trial operation. It was announced that the official opening was postponed to the end of 2022 or early 2023, with limited trial operations expected to begin during that period. The head of the Egyptian Tourist Guides Syndicate, Basem Halaka, announced that the Grand Egyptian Museum would open by the end of 2023.
- 2023–2024: Minister of Tourism Ahmed Issa stated that the Grand Egyptian Museum will open in May 2024. This did not happen, but the museum was opened for a trial period to four thousand visitors in October 2024. After that, the final opening date was set for 3 July 2025.
- 2025: The Ministry of Tourism and Antiquities announced that it had postponed the opening of the Grand Egyptian Museum, which was scheduled to open on 3 July 2025. In another statement to local newspapers, Prime Minister Mostafa Madbouly said, "All readings indicate that the existing conflict will continue for a while and will not end in a few days, and therefore will have repercussions on the region and on all expected events" referring to the then-ongoing Twelve-Day War between Iran and Israel.

==== Final official opening date ====
On 6 August 2025, Prime Minister Mostafa Madbouly announced that President Abdel Fattah el-Sisi had agreed to set the GEM's opening date for 1 November, though it was temporarily closed from 15 October to 3 November 2025, inclusive. The museum resumed receiving visitors during official working hours on 4 November, the 103rd anniversary of the discovery of the tomb of Tutankhamun.

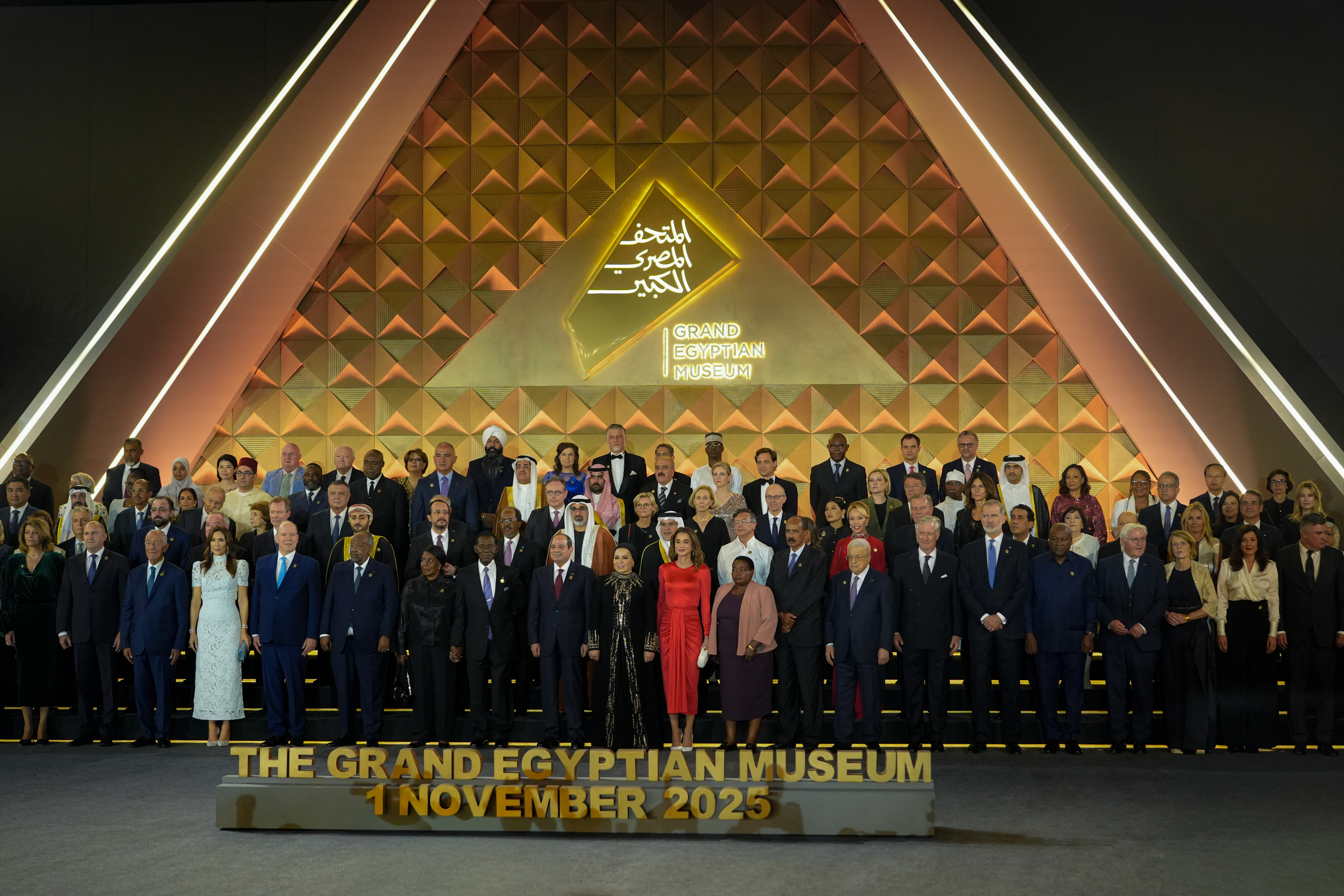
Egyptian President Abdel Fattah al-Sisi with representatives of foreign countries at the official opening of the Grand Egyptian Museum

The GEM was fully inaugurated on 1 November 2025. The opening ceremony was attended by Egyptian President Abdel Fatah El-Sisi, the First Lady of Egypt, as well as representatives of foreign countries and prominent public figures such as King Philippe of Belgium, King Felipe VI of Spain, Prince Albert II of Monaco, Queen Rania of Jordan, Queen Mary of Denmark, former Grand-Duke Henri of Luxembourg, German President Frank-Walter Steinmeier, Portuguese president Marcelo Rebelo de Sousa, Palestinian President Mahmoud Abbas, Greek Prime Minister Kyriakos Mitsotakis, Hungarian Prime Minister Viktor Orbán and others.

=== Visitors ===
After its trial run in October 2024, the museum was visited by an average 4,000 per day. It recorded 1.5 million visitors in the course of 10 months.On the first day after its official opening to the public, there were 18,000 visitors.

== Collections and visit ==
The museum contains more than 100,000 artifacts distributed across 12 main permanent exhibition halls, as well as several other important halls. As the Egyptian Egyptologists (M. A.Eissa & A. el-Senussi) claim, this is “a new version of the (Pharaonic) ancient Egyptian museum”.

=== Grand Hall (Atrium) ===
Grand Hall (Atrium) with the statue of Pharaoh Ramesses II

The Atrium (Great Hall) of the Grand Egyptian Museum is the main entrance hall, spanning 10,000 square meters. Designed with a glass roof and a transparent façade, the Giza Pyramids are visible from inside.

It houses the statue of Pharaoh Ramesses II (11 meters, 83 t (183,000 lb)) and 20–30 large artifacts from different eras, making it an introductory exhibition. The Grand Staircase connects the 12 main exhibition halls. The statue was moved from Ramses Square in Cairo to its location (GEM) in 2006 and placed in the Grand Hall (Atrium) in 2018.

=== Grand Staircase ===
The staircase serves as a transitional gallery with more than 60 artifacts, leading to the 12 halls. Spanning 6,000 m^{2} (65,000 ft^{2}), the structure stands six stories tall (approximately 50 m (160 ft)), connecting the main lobby (atrium), temporary exhibition halls, and the main archaeological storeroom to the upper terrace, offering another view of the Giza Pyramids.

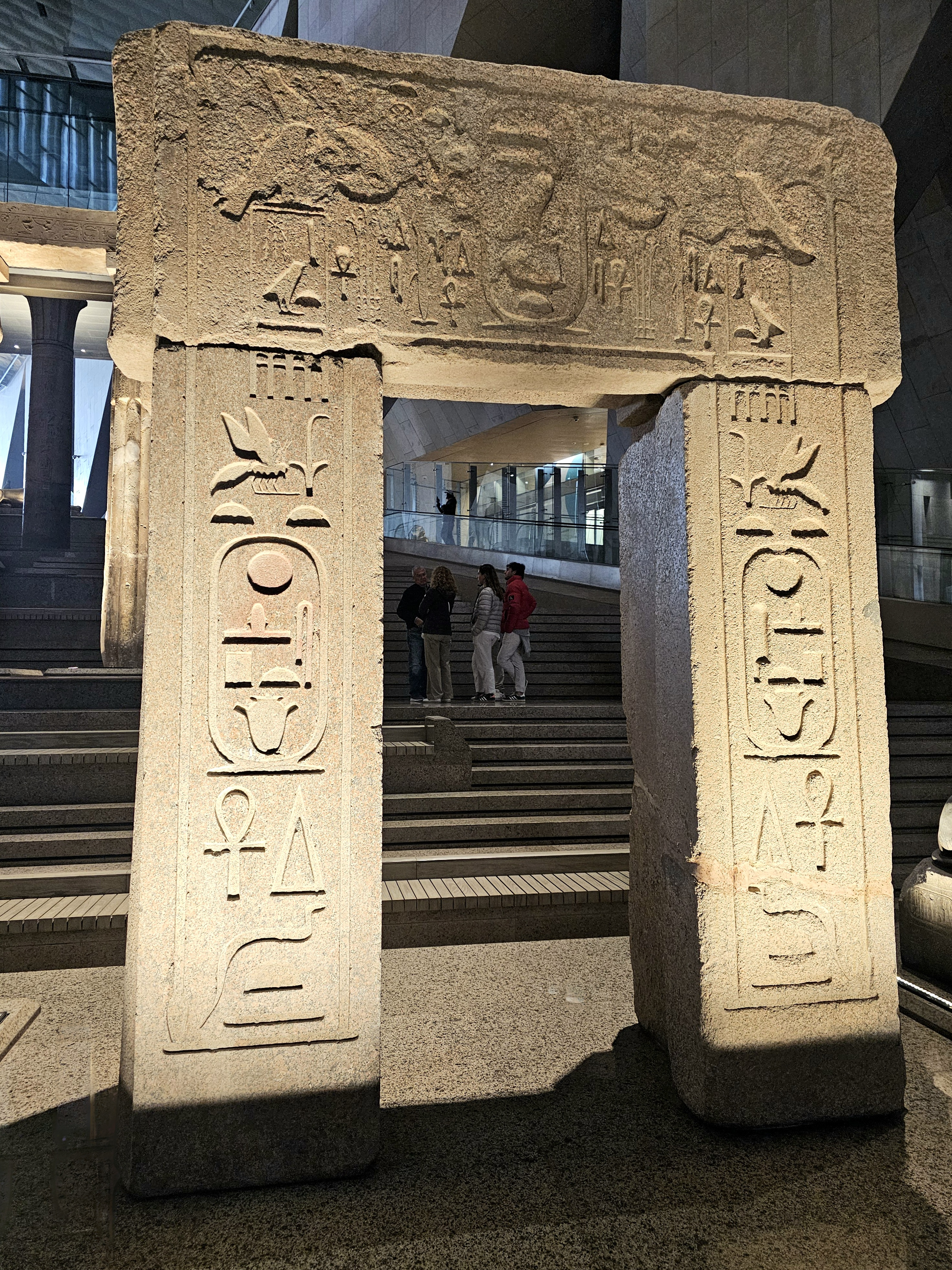
Temple fragment

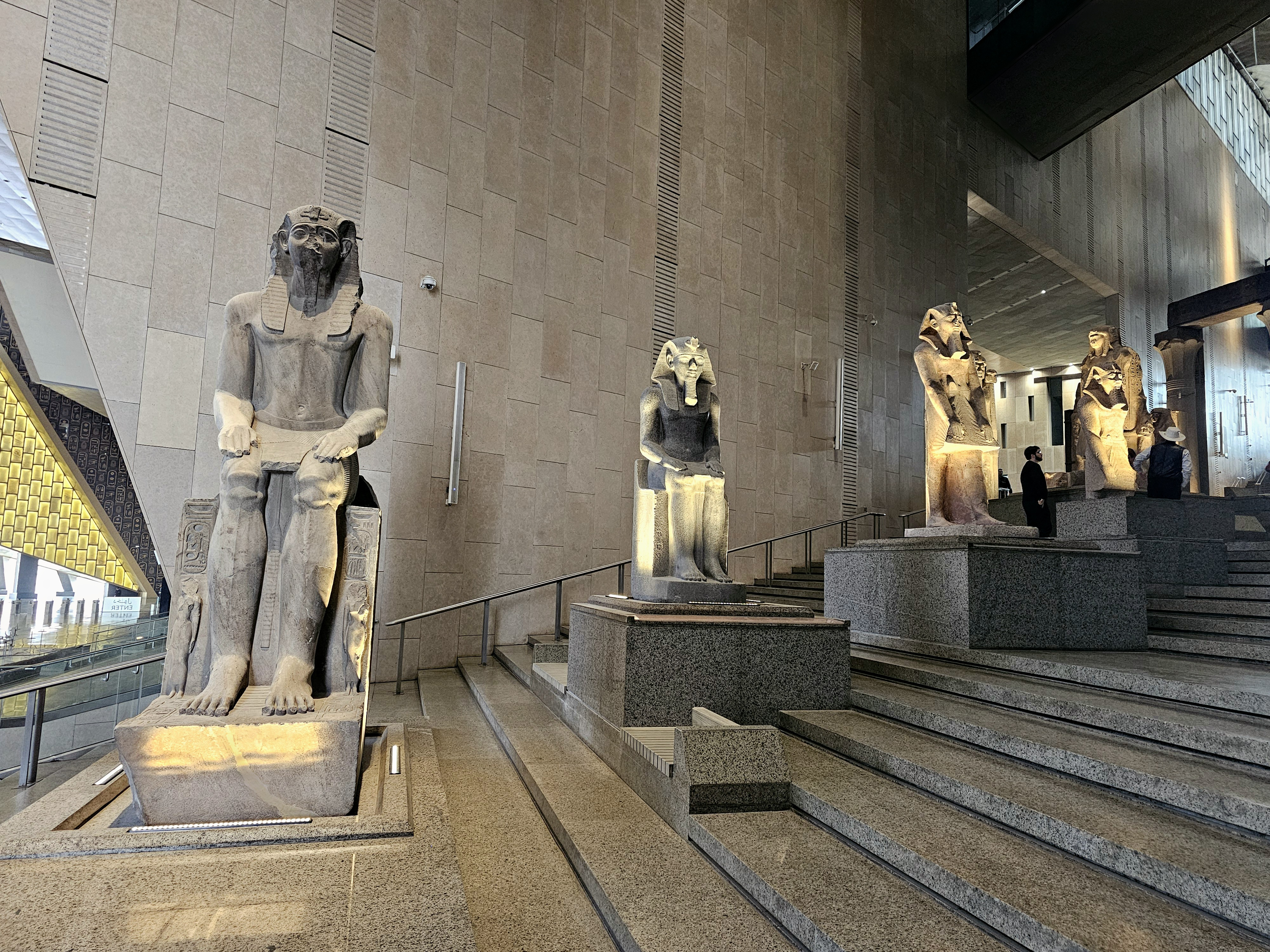
Grand Staircase

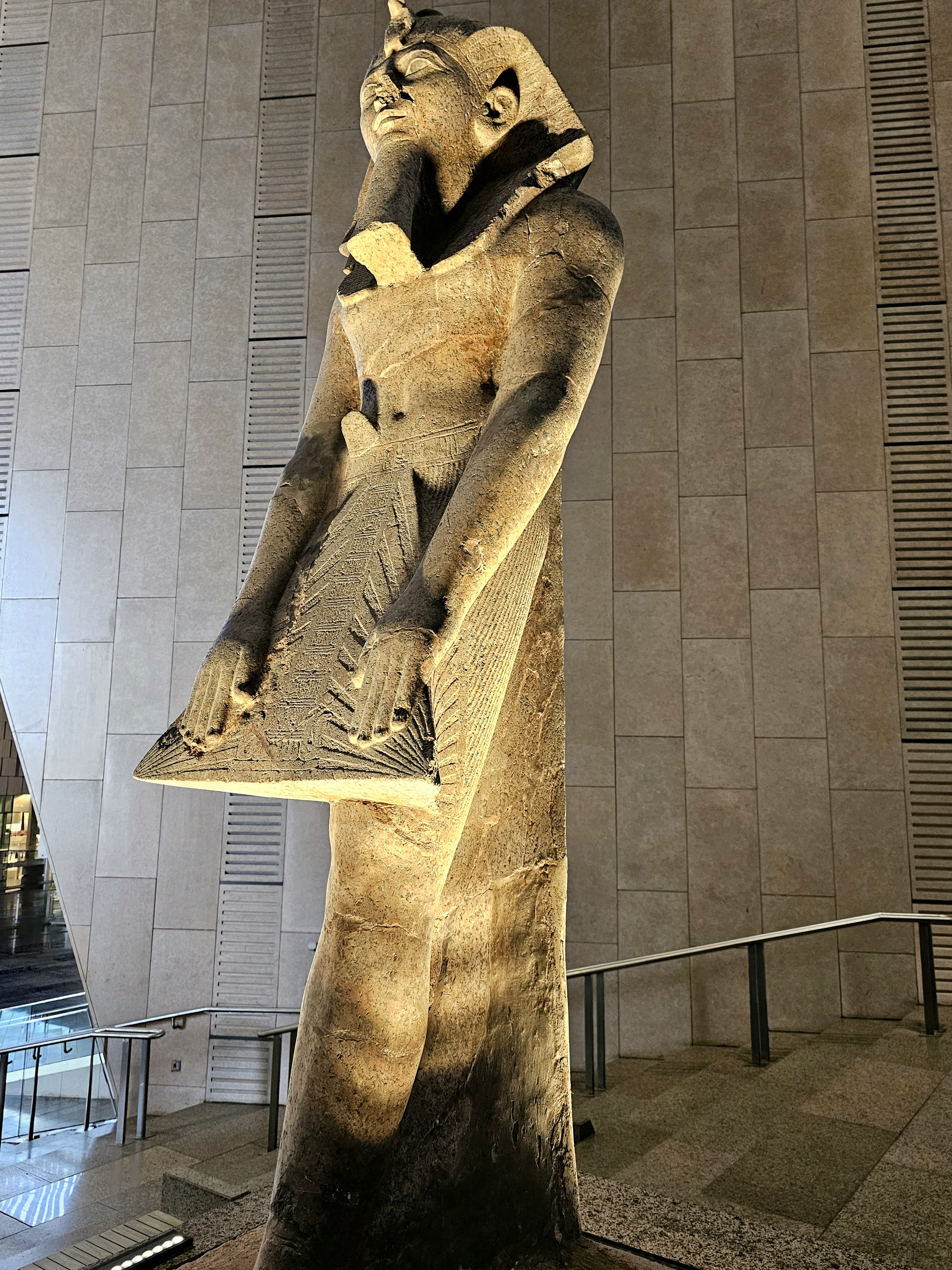
Pharaoh Hatshepsut

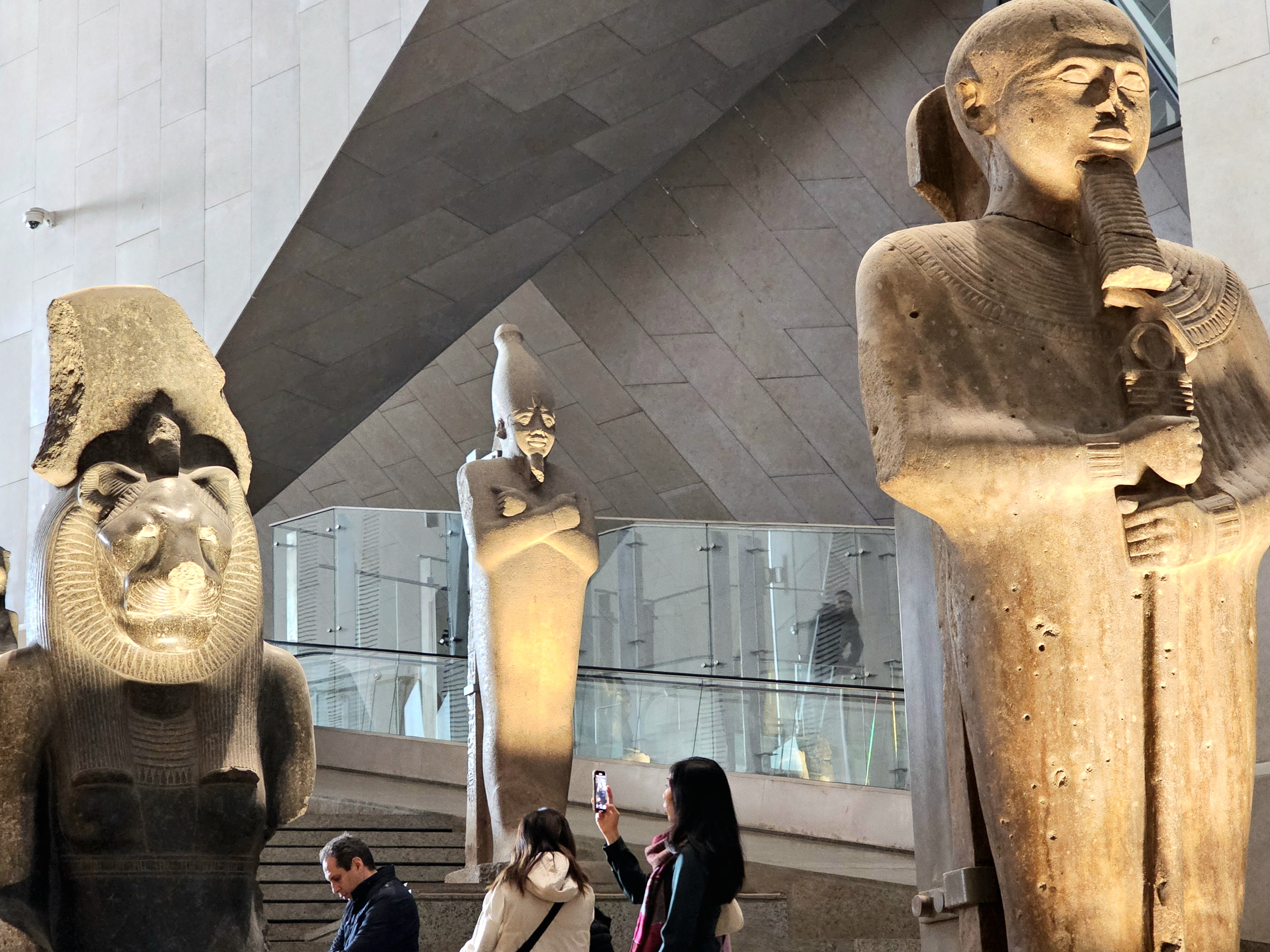
Ancient Egyptian deities

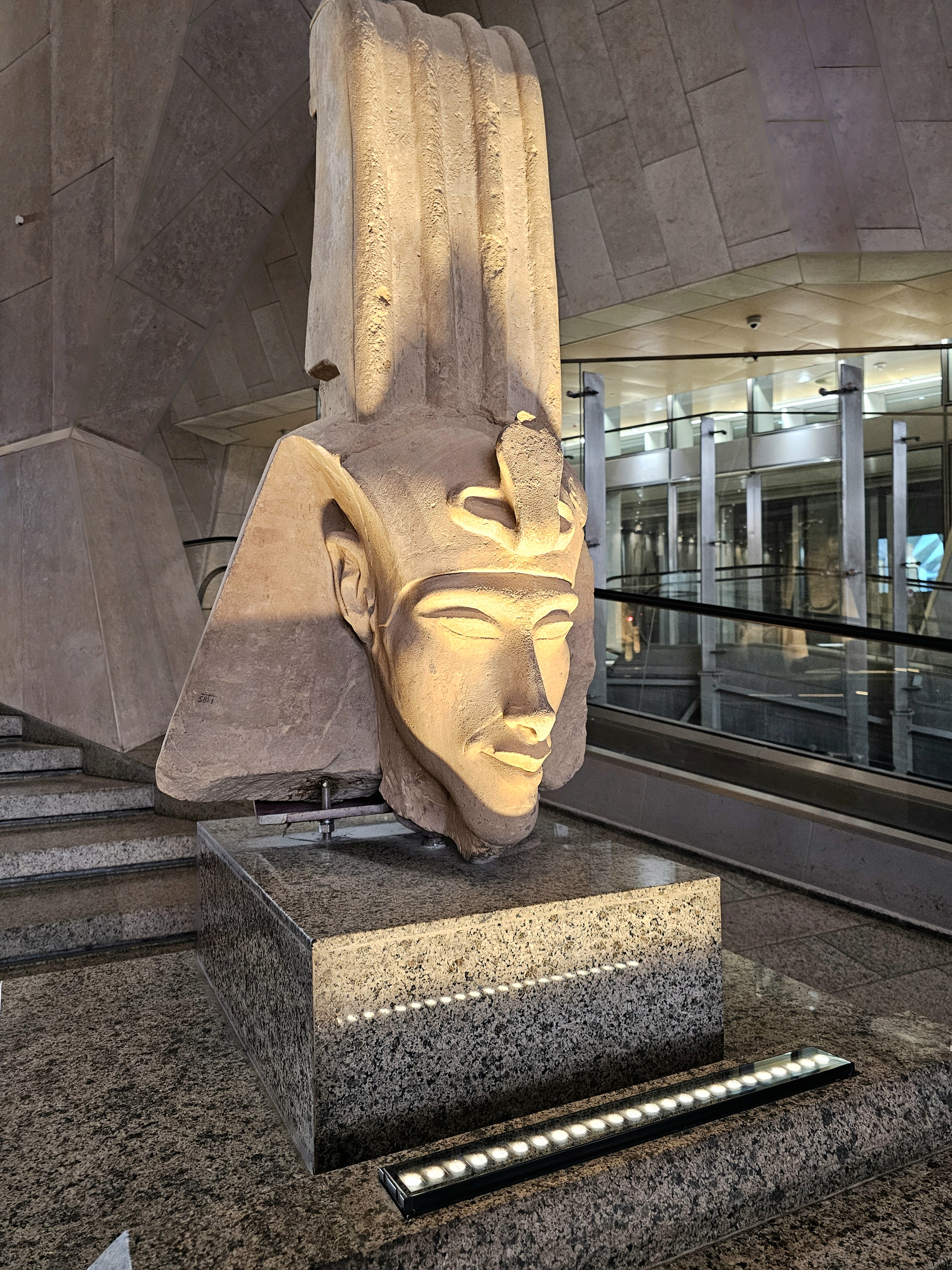
Pharaoh Akhenaten

It contains more than 60 artifacts, arranged in four thematic sections that represent a chronological journey (Royal Image: focuses on how and why pharaohs portrayed themselves, with royal statues; Divine Houses: on temples and the relationship between gods and pharaohs, with religious artwork; Gods & Kings: explores ancient Egyptian deities and their association with rulers; Funerary Section: displays stone coffins and sarcophagi from various eras, including a hermione (pyramid head) from the 13th Dynasty.

=== Main Galleries ===
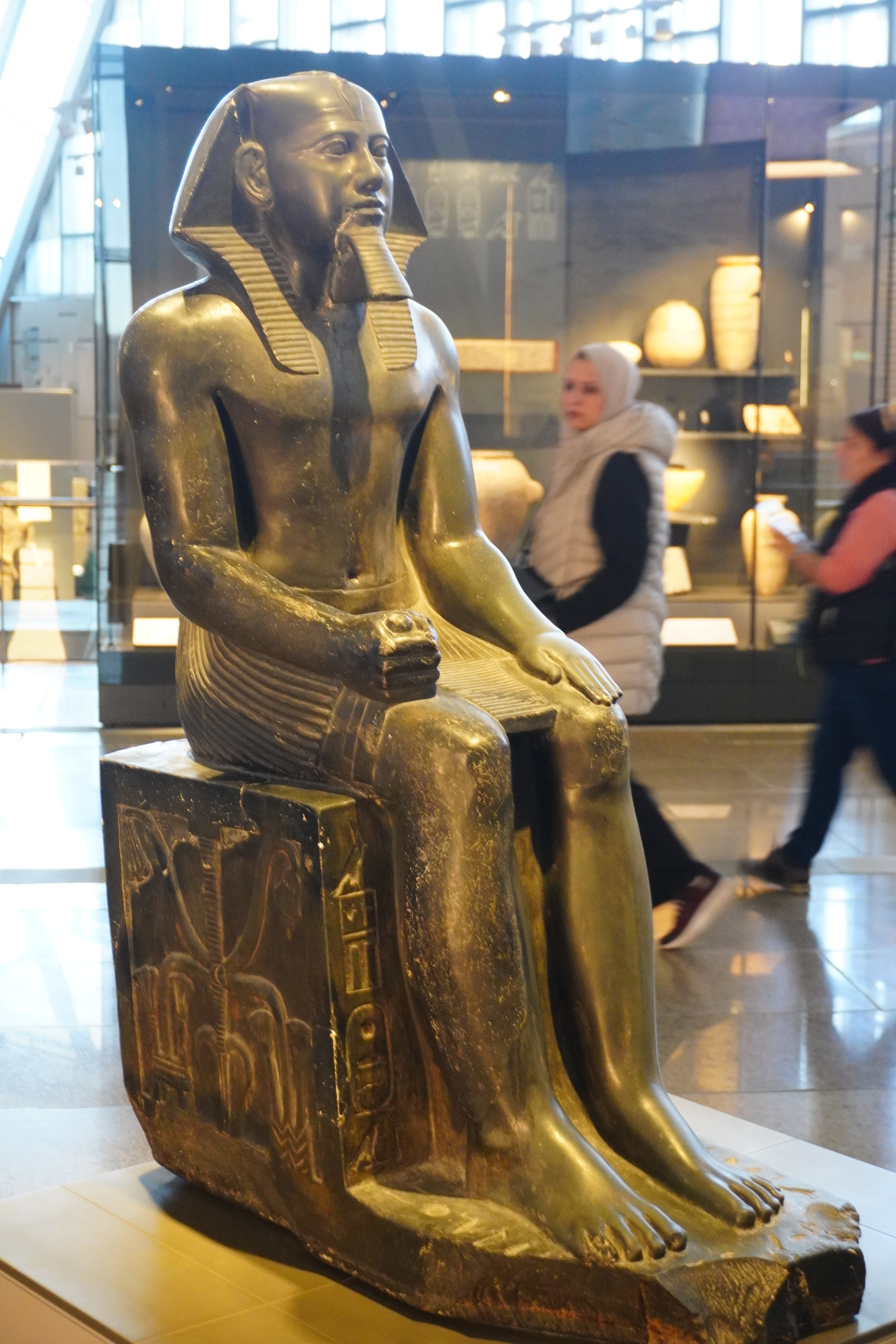
Statue of Khafre at the GEM

The exhibits cover about one-third of the total museum's 50 ha (5,400,000 ft^{2}) grounds, displaying over 24,000 artifacts in 12 galleries arranged by time period (c. 3100 BCE – 400 CE). The artifacts were relocated from storage and museums in Cairo, Luxor, Minya, Sohag, Assiut, Beni Suef, Faiyum, the Nile Delta, and Alexandria.

Halls 01–03 cover Prehistoric Egypt, the Predynastic Period, the Early Dynastic Period, the Old Kingdom era, and the First Intermediate Period. Halls 04–06 cover the Middle Kingdom and the Second Intermediate Period. Halls 07–09 address the era of the New Kingdom. Halls 10 through 12 cover the Third Intermediate Period, the Late Period, and the Greek and Roman Periods of Egypt. Based on the recent review of the museum, the largest space is dedicated to the material culture from the Middle to New Kingdoms.

=== Tutankhamun Halls ===
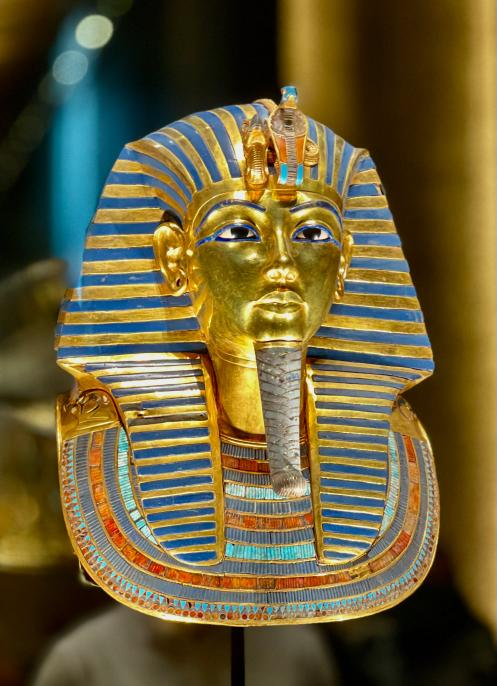
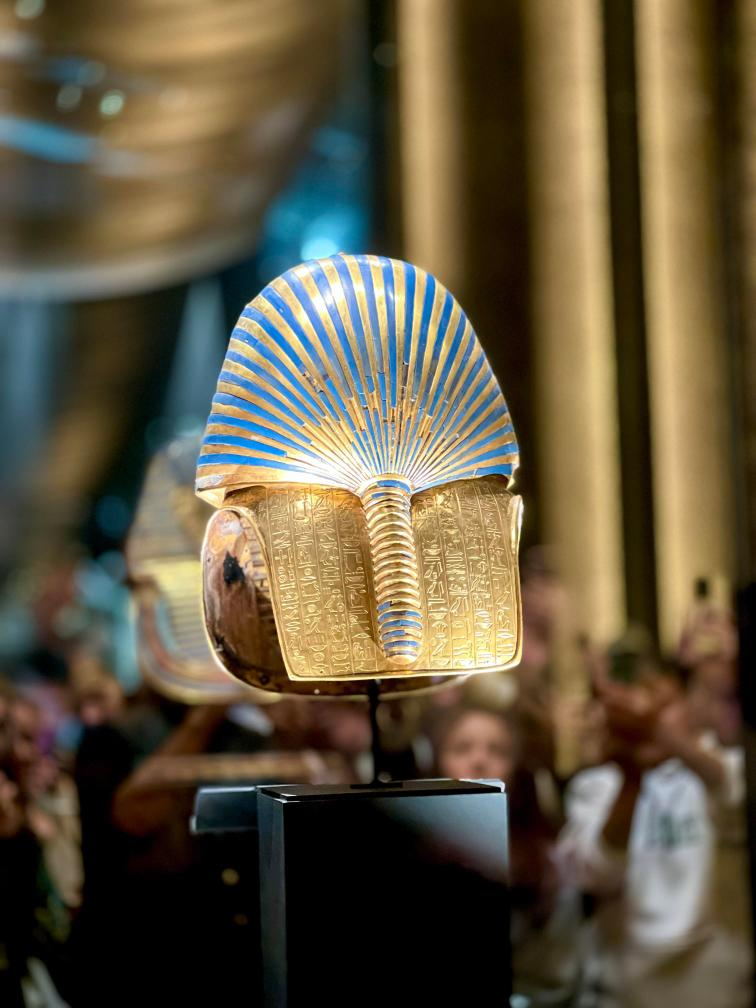
The golden mask of Pharaoh Tutankhamun inside the GEM

Two of the twelve halls are dedicated exclusively to the display of 5,398 artifacts belonging to King Tutankhamun, the pharaoh of the Eighteenth Dynasty (ruled ca. 1332–1323 BC). This is the first time the entire collection has been displayed in one place, unlike the partial display at the Egyptian Museum in Tahrir Square previously. These two halls cover 7,000 square meters.

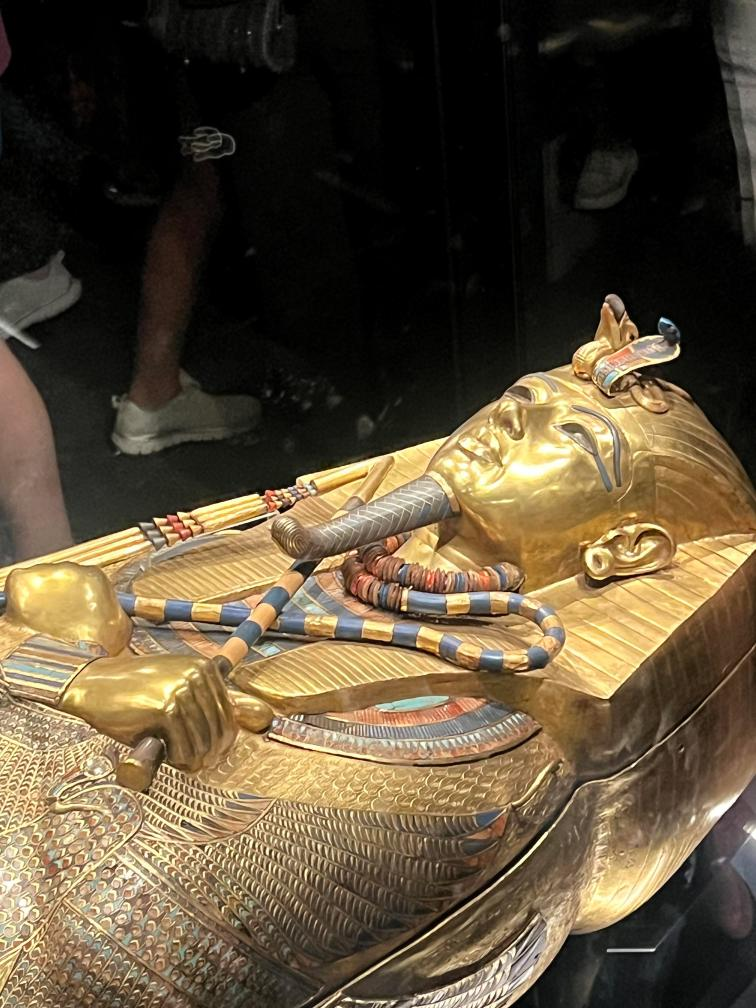
The sarcophagus of Pharaoh Tutankhamun inside the GEM

The central piece is the golden Mask of Tutankhamun. There are three overlapping coffins, one made of gold (110 kg) and two of gold-plated wood. The Golden Throne is a chair covered in gold and silver, showing scenes of Tutankhamun and his wife, Ankhesenamun. There are statues of gods such as Anubis, as well as amulets and jewellery such as necklaces and rings. Daily tools include weapons (daggers, bows), furniture (beds, chairs), and dining utensils. There are ushabti: small statues or figurines that were used in the afterlife to serve the king.

Tutankhamun's mummy will remain in the Valley of the Kings and will not be moved.

The halls are designed similarly to the original Tomb of Tutankhamun in the Valley of the Kings. Environmental control systems (such as temperature and humidity control) protect sensitive pieces, especially those made of gold, wood, and fabric.

=== Khufu Ships Museum ===
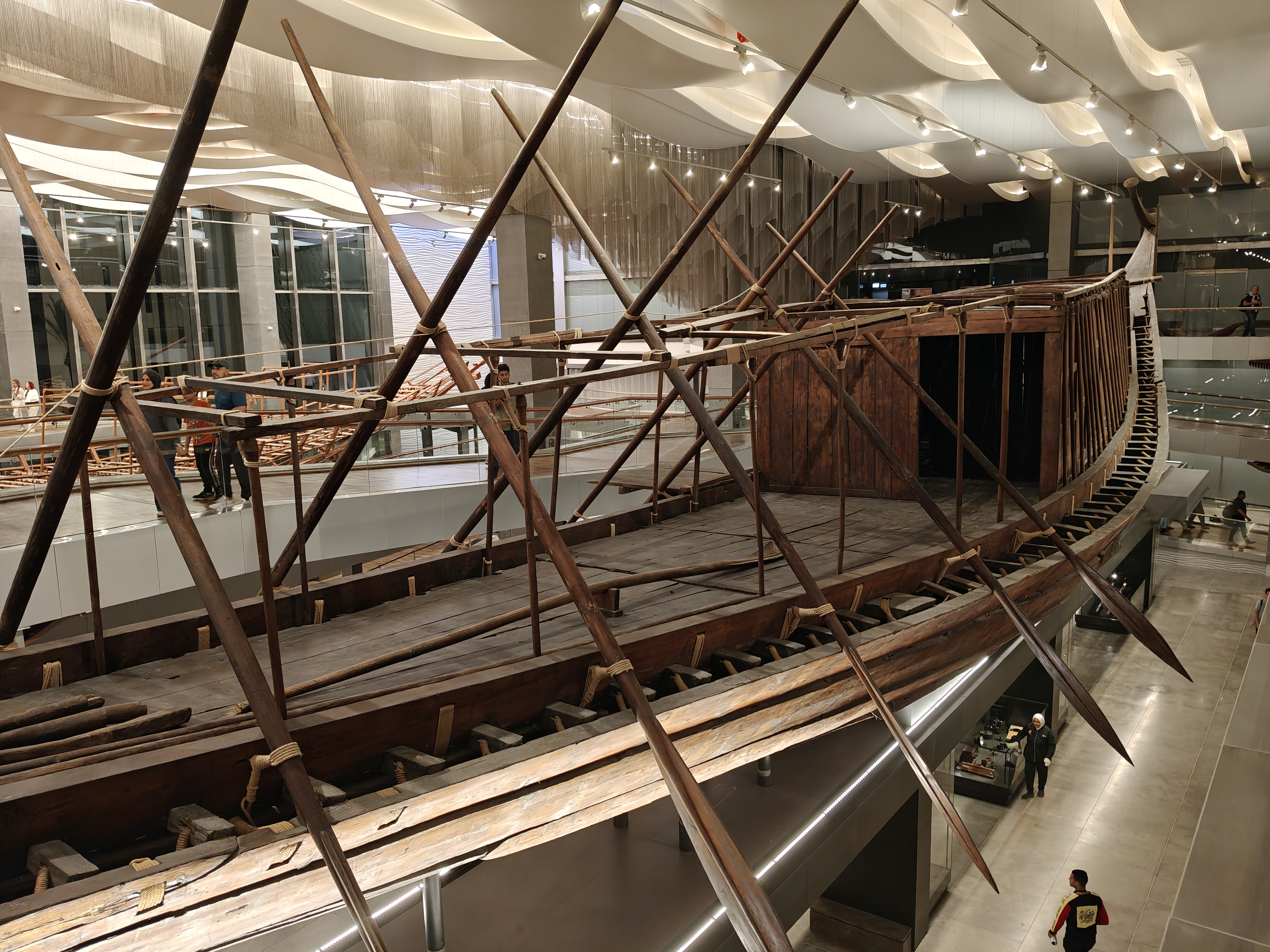
The Khufu ship, a full-size solar barque, at the GEM

The Khufu Ships Museum is a separate hall dedicated to displaying the two solar boats of King Khufu (the builder of the Great Pyramid), which are among the oldest wooden ships ever discovered, dating to approximately 4,600 years ago. Included is an interactive display explaining their proposed purpose(s) (perhaps to transport the king into the afterlife or his travels with the sun god Ra). It was transferred from the old Giza Solar boat museum in August 2021.

=== Children's Museum ===
The Children's Museum at GEM is an interactive space for children aged 6 to 12, emphasizing learning through play rather than traditional exhibits. It covers 5,000 square meters and offers experiences including interactive screens, Augmented reality (AR), and hands-on games, along with various visual exhibits and guided programs. It has been partially open since August 2024.

=== Conference Center ===
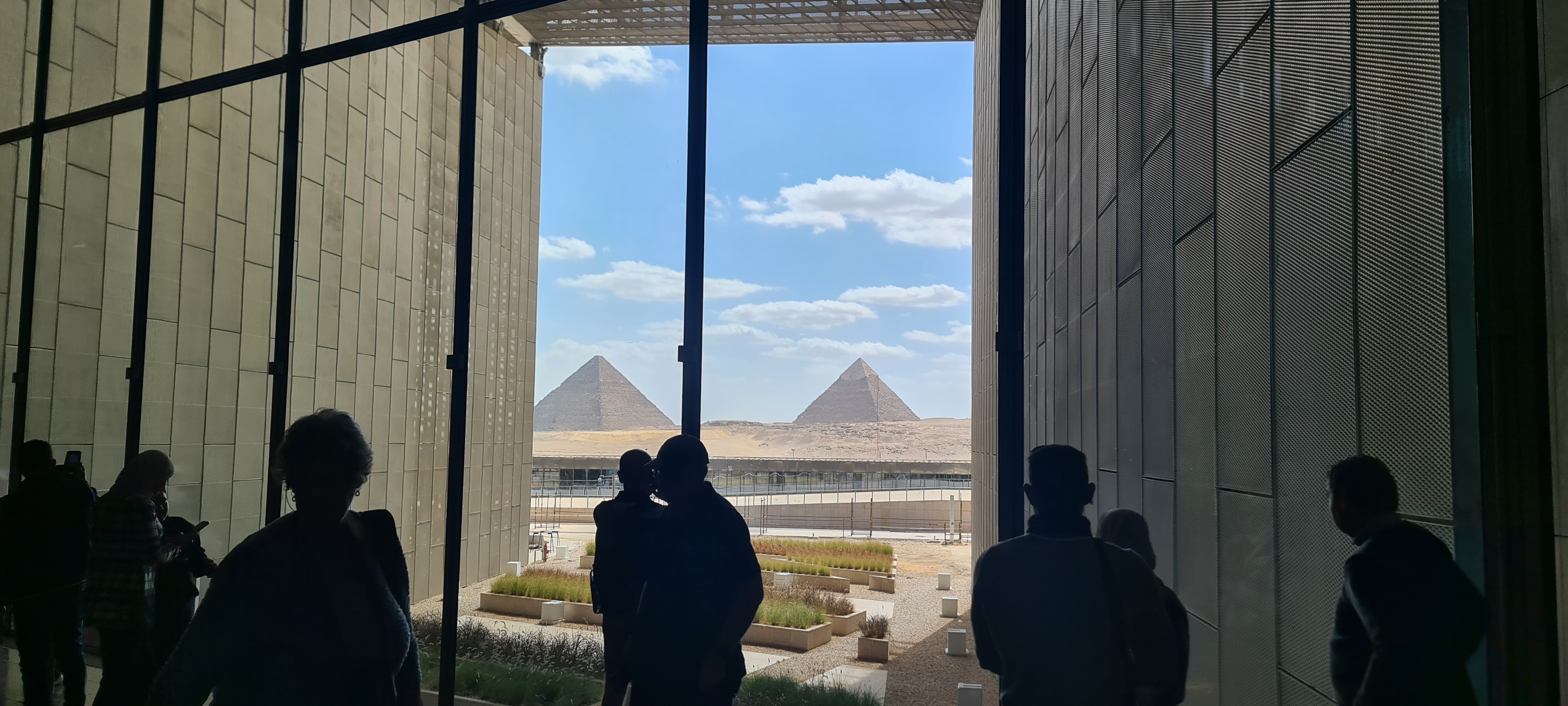
View of the Pyramids of Giza from the Grand Egyptian Museum

The Grand Egyptian Museum's Conference Center is designed to serve as an international hub for communication between museums and cultural institutions. It aims to host conferences, seminars, and educational events related to ancient Egyptian civilization and archaeology.

It covers a total area of 40,000 m^{2} (430,000 ft^{2}), divided into multi-use areas. It includes a main auditorium with a capacity of 1,000 seats, three seminar halls with a capacity of 250 seats each, exhibition spaces, meeting rooms, a business center, and a press room. There is also a 250-seat 3D theater. The design is inspired by ancient Pharaonic sites. Located within the main complex, it is accessible via the main atrium, with accessibility facilities for the disabled, including elevators and rest areas.

=== Temporary Exhibition Halls ===
Four Temporary Exhibition Halls are dedicated to the display of temporary artifacts or international exhibitions. These cover a total of 5,000 m^{2} (54,000 ft^{2}). These are part of 32,000 m^{2} (340,000 ft^{2}) dedicated to non-permanent displays.

== Conservation Center ==
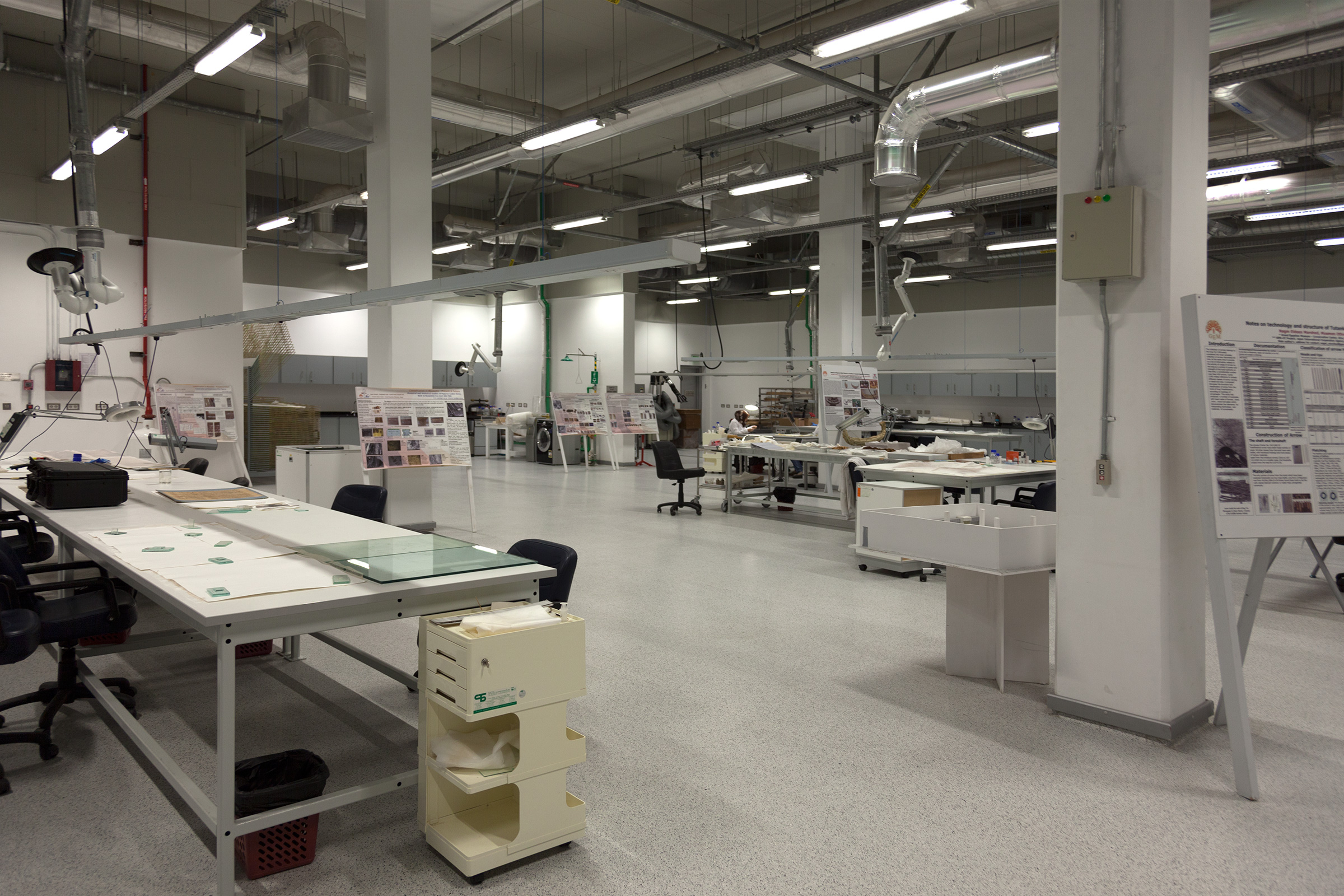
GEM Conservation Center

The Grand Egyptian Museum's Conservation Center is one of the largest conservation and restoration centers in the world and the largest center for the restoration of antiquities in the Middle East. It was established in 2006 and opened in 2010. It is located west of the museum and connected to it via a tunnel approximately 200 meters long. The center houses 19 laboratories, including those for the restoration of mummies, wood, stone, wall paintings, and metals, as well as laboratories for preventive conservation and scientific documentation. It also contains six storage rooms for preserving artifacts in controlled environmental conditions.

== Design ==
The Hanging Obelisk of Pharaoh Ramesses II at the main gate of the GEM

The building design was decided by an architectural competition announced on 7 January 2002. The organisers received 1,557 entries from 82 countries, making it the second largest architectural competition in history. In the second stage of the competition, 20 entries submitted additional information on their designs. Judging was complete by 2 June 2003. The competition was won by architects Róisín Heneghan and Shi-Fu Peng, and their company Heneghan Peng Architects of Ireland; the prize was US$250,000. Heneghan Peng, Buro Happold, Arup and ACE Consulting Engineers (Moharram and Bakhoum) collaborated on the design of the building. The landscape and site masterplan was designed by West 8; the exhibition masterplan, exhibition design, and museology was led by Atelier Brückner. On 2 February 2010, Hill International announced that Egypt's Ministry of Culture had signed a contract with a joint venture of Hill and EHAF Consulting Engineers which, with the support of ITD Egypt, whose involvement was instrumental in winning the bid. The venture will provide project management services during the design and construction of the Grand Egyptian Museum.

The building's shape is a chamfered triangle. It sits on a site 2 kilometres (1.2 miles) northwest of the pyramids, near a motorway interchange. The building's north and south walls line up directly with the Great Pyramid of Khufu and the Pyramid of Menkaure. The front of the museum includes a large plaza filled with date palms and a façade made of translucent alabaster stone. Inside the main entrance is a large atrium where large statues are exhibited.

The museum's facade is made of marble and glass, decorated with cartouches and ovals surrounding Egyptian hieroglyphs bearing the names of kings and queens.

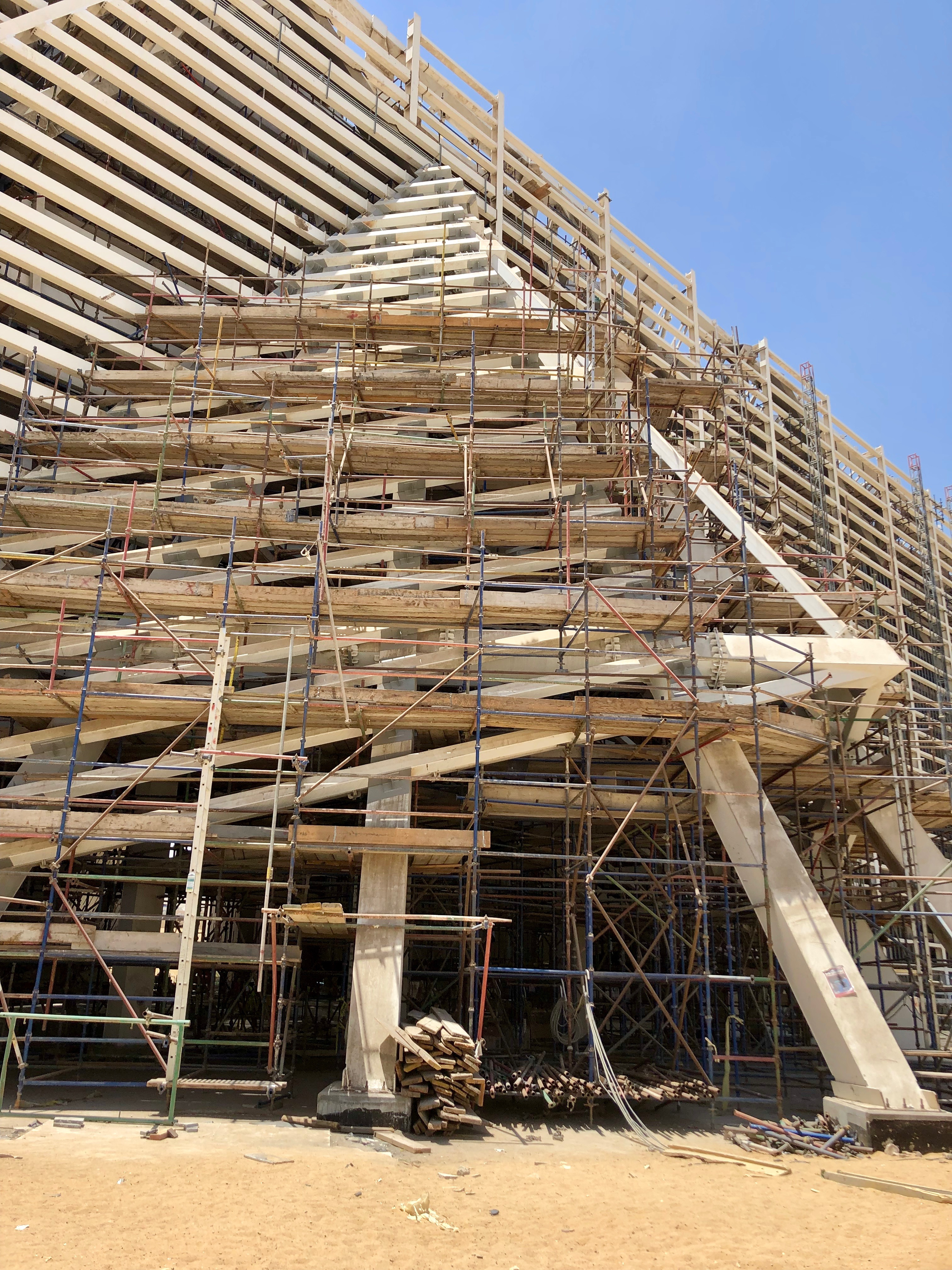
The main gate of the Grand Egyptian Museum during the construction phase 2019

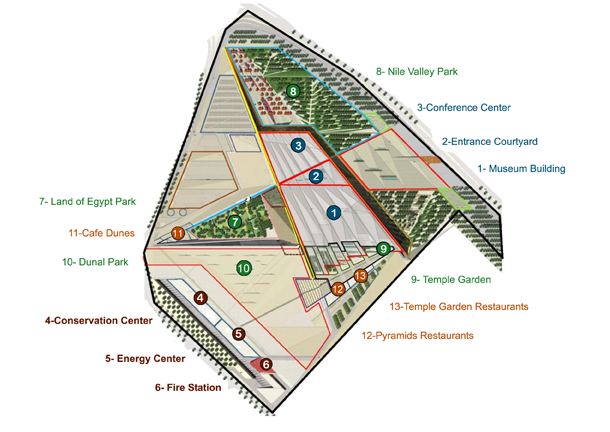
A guide map of the Grand Egyptian Museum facilities

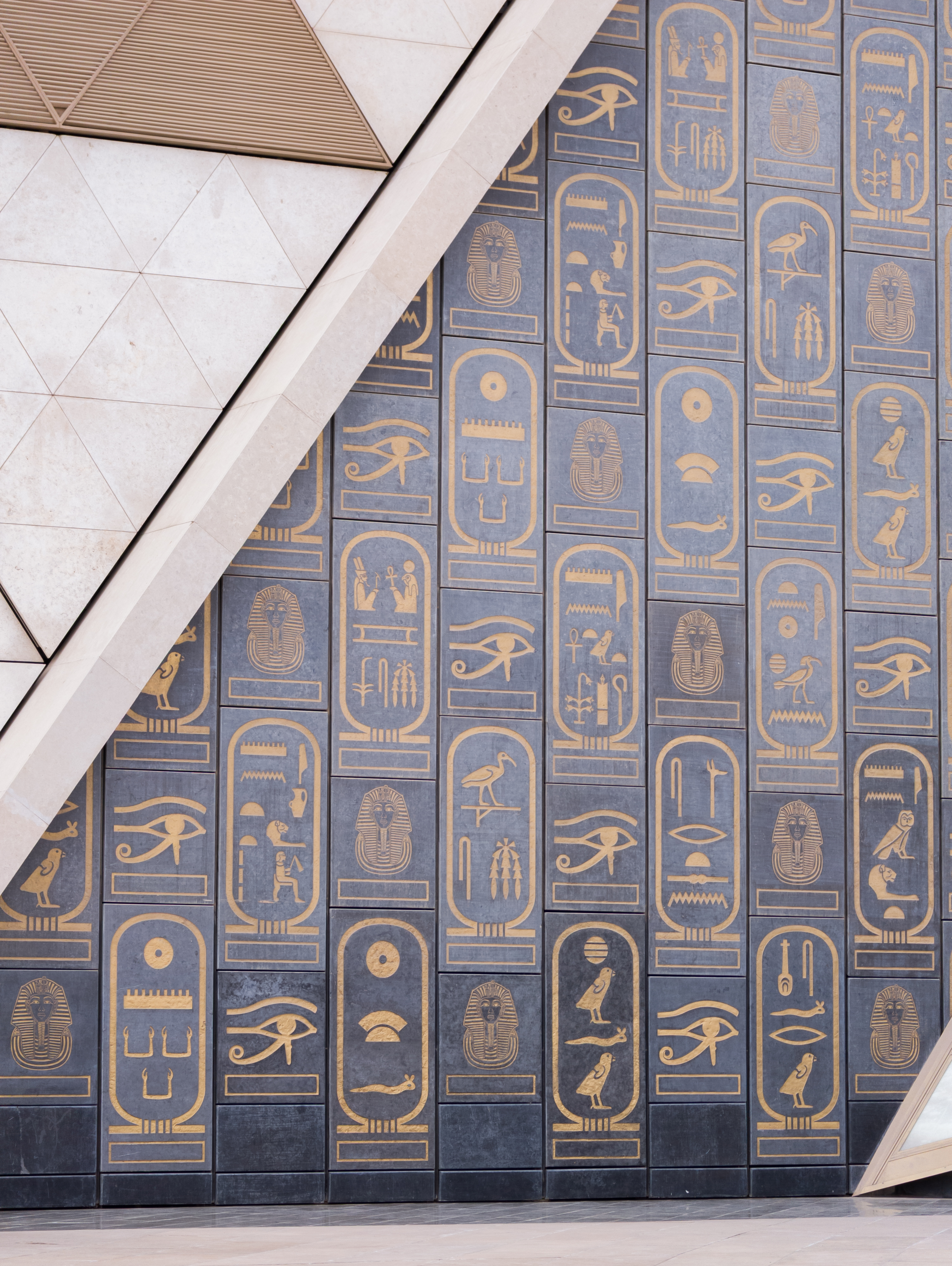
Hieroglyphic decorations on the walls of the Grand Egyptian Museum

=== Logo design ===
On 10 June 2018, the museum's logo was revealed. The logo was designed by Tariq Atrissi. The cost of the design amounted to 800,000 Egyptian pounds, which included the costs of designing the museum exhibition implemented by the German company Atelier Bruckner.

== Management ==
The GEM's management structure includes the Board of Trustees, the Board of Directors, and the Museum's CEO and vice presidents.

The Board of Trustees is an oversight body responsible for approving the Museum Authority's policies and plans. It consists of a 16-person council which sits for a term of 3 years. The composition, term length, and scope of work of the Board of Trustees are determined by the President of Egypt.

== Events ==
On 20 January 2023, the museum hosted its first musical concert. Egyptian soprano Fatma Said appeared with the United Philharmonic Orchestra and Choir, conducted by Nader Abbassi.

== Gallery ==
Museum entrance

Museum facade

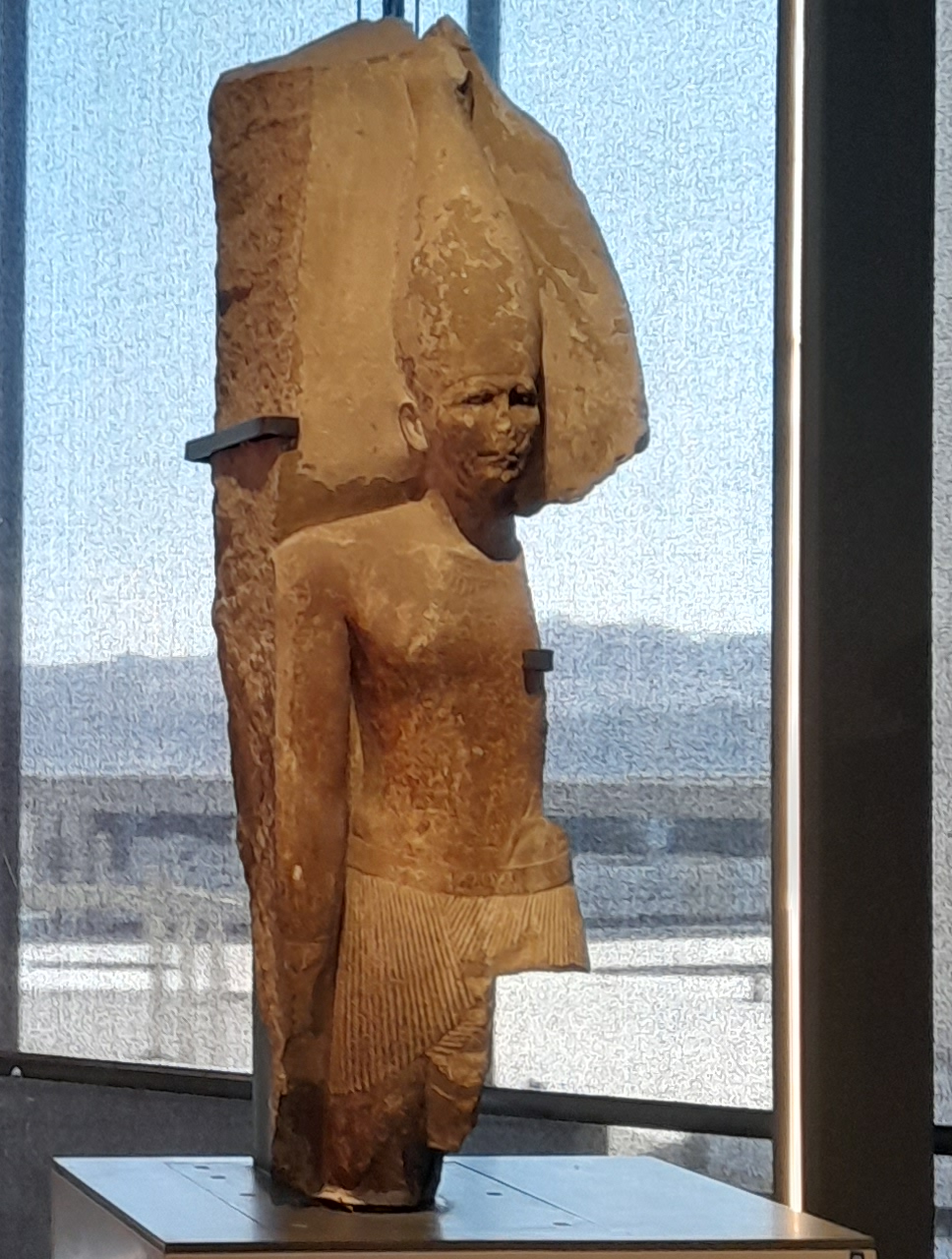
Statue of Sneferu

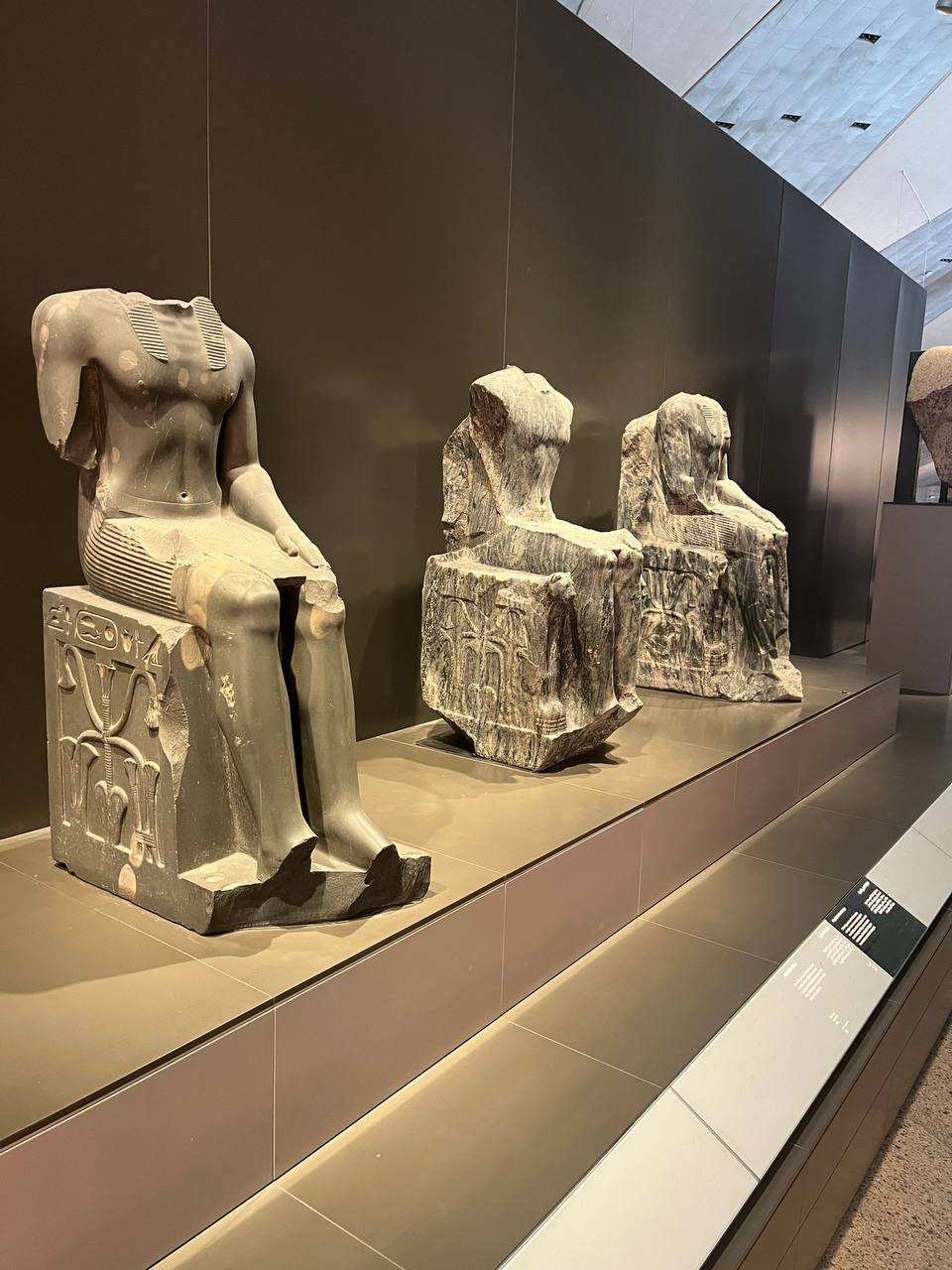
Headless statues of Khafre from his valley temple at Giza

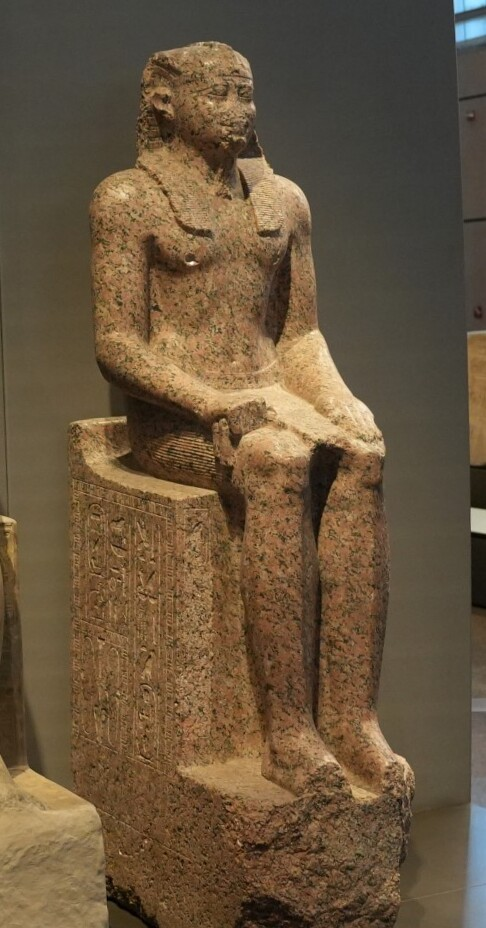
Statue of Amenemhat I

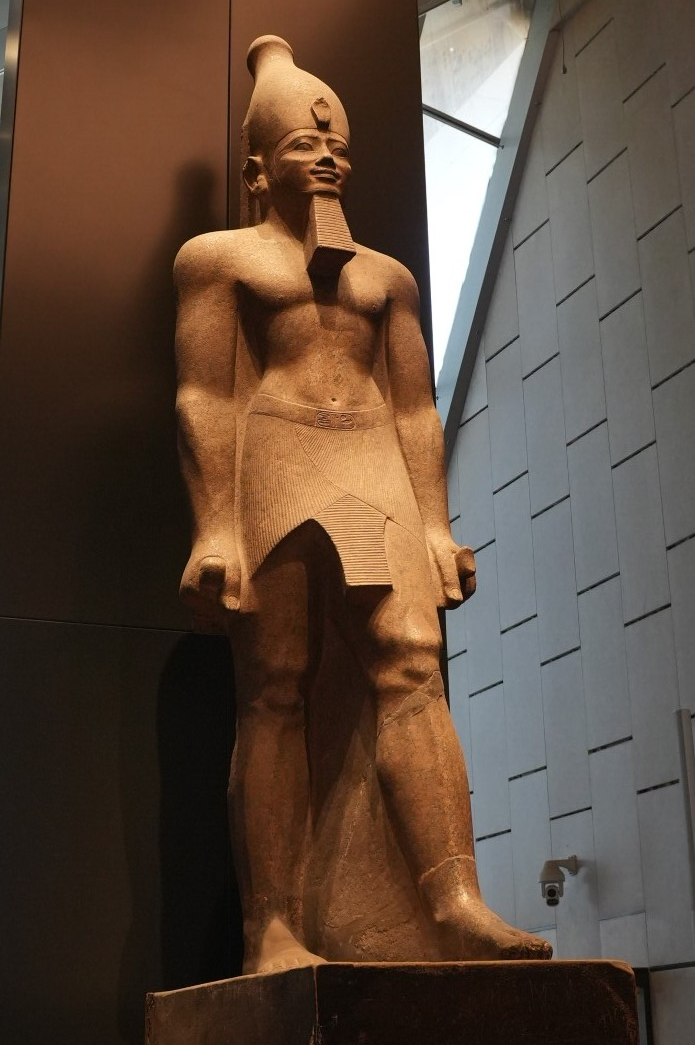
Statue of Senusret I

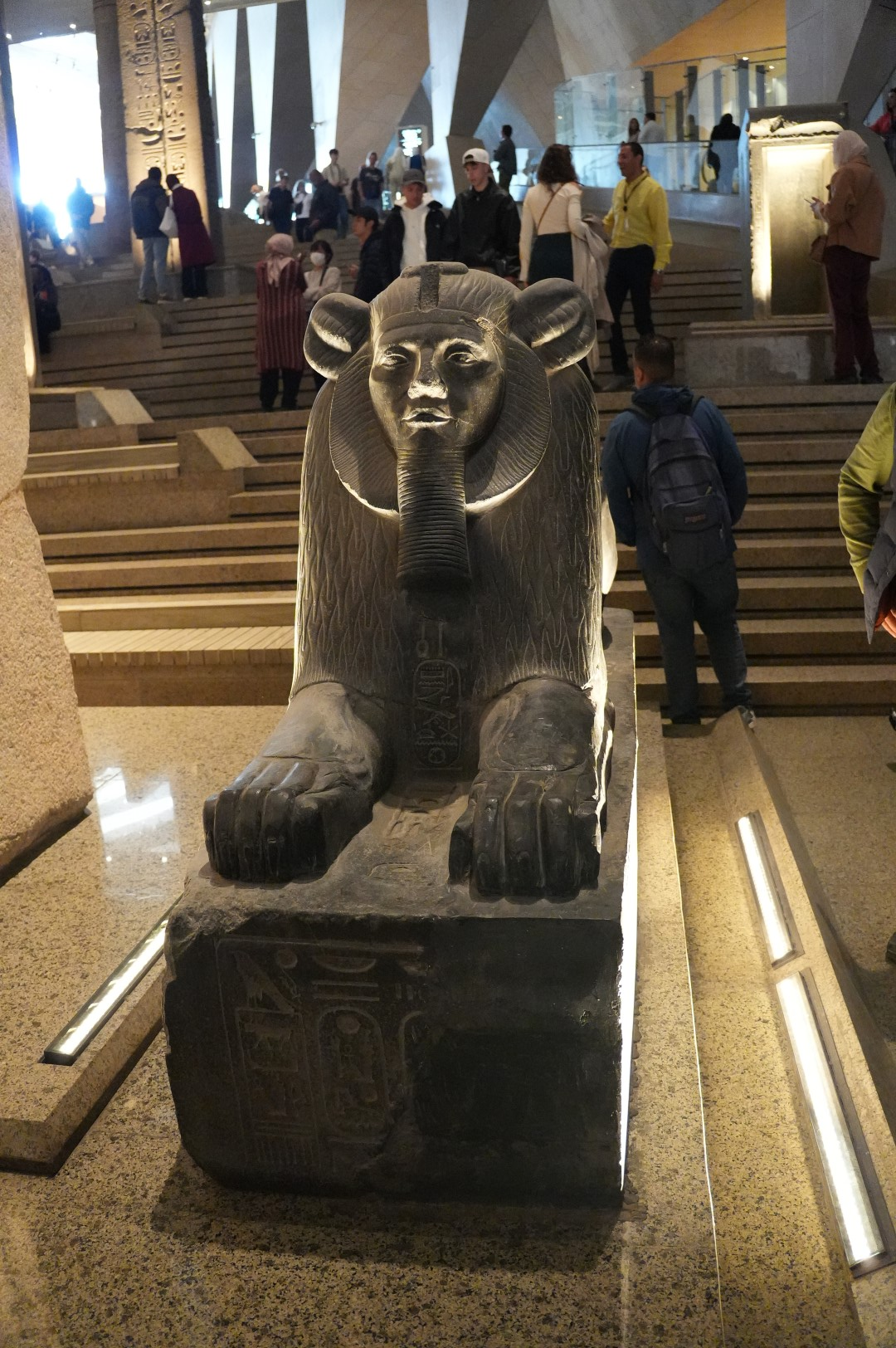
Sphinx of Amenemhat III

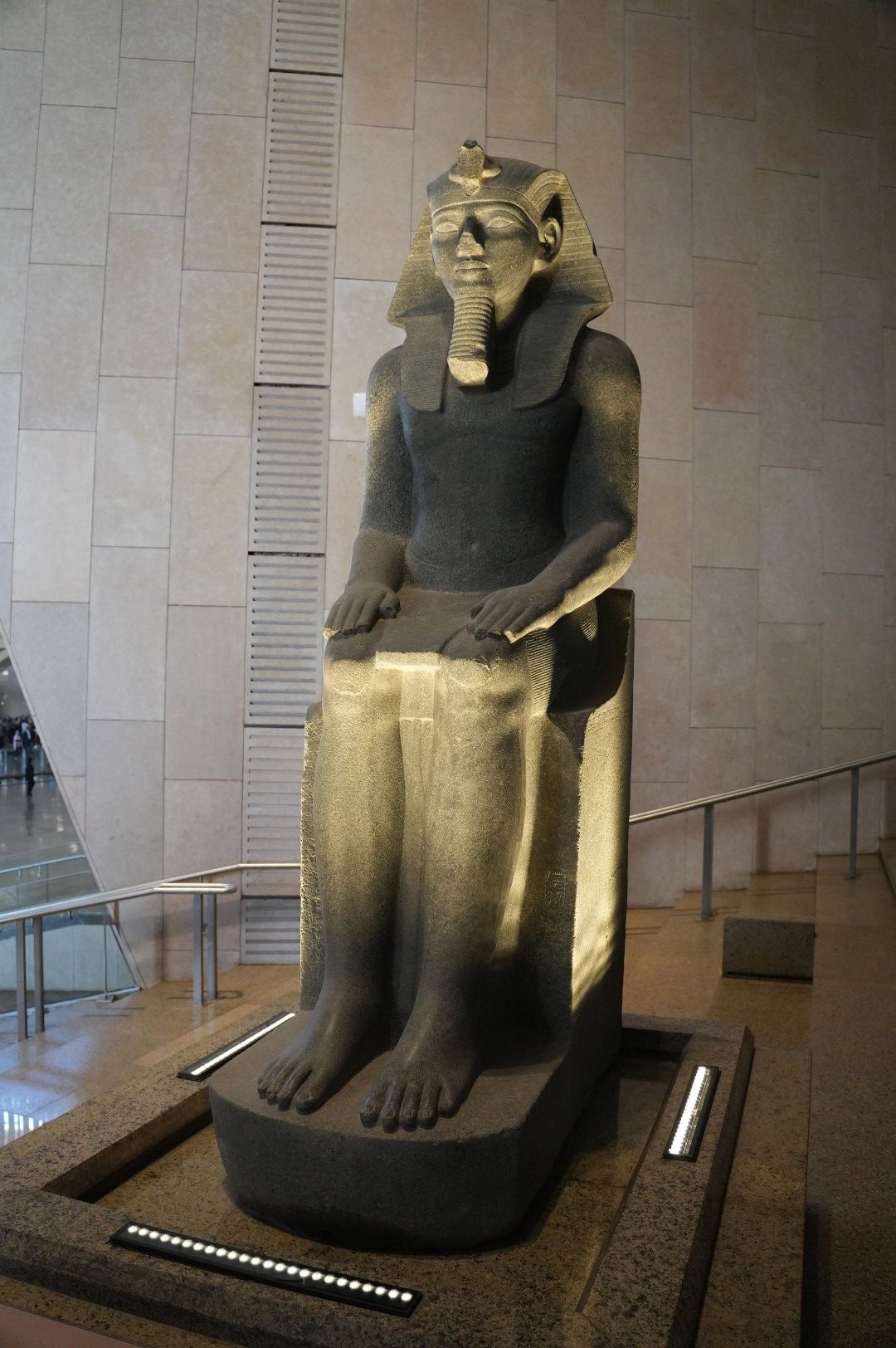
Seated statue of Amenhotep III

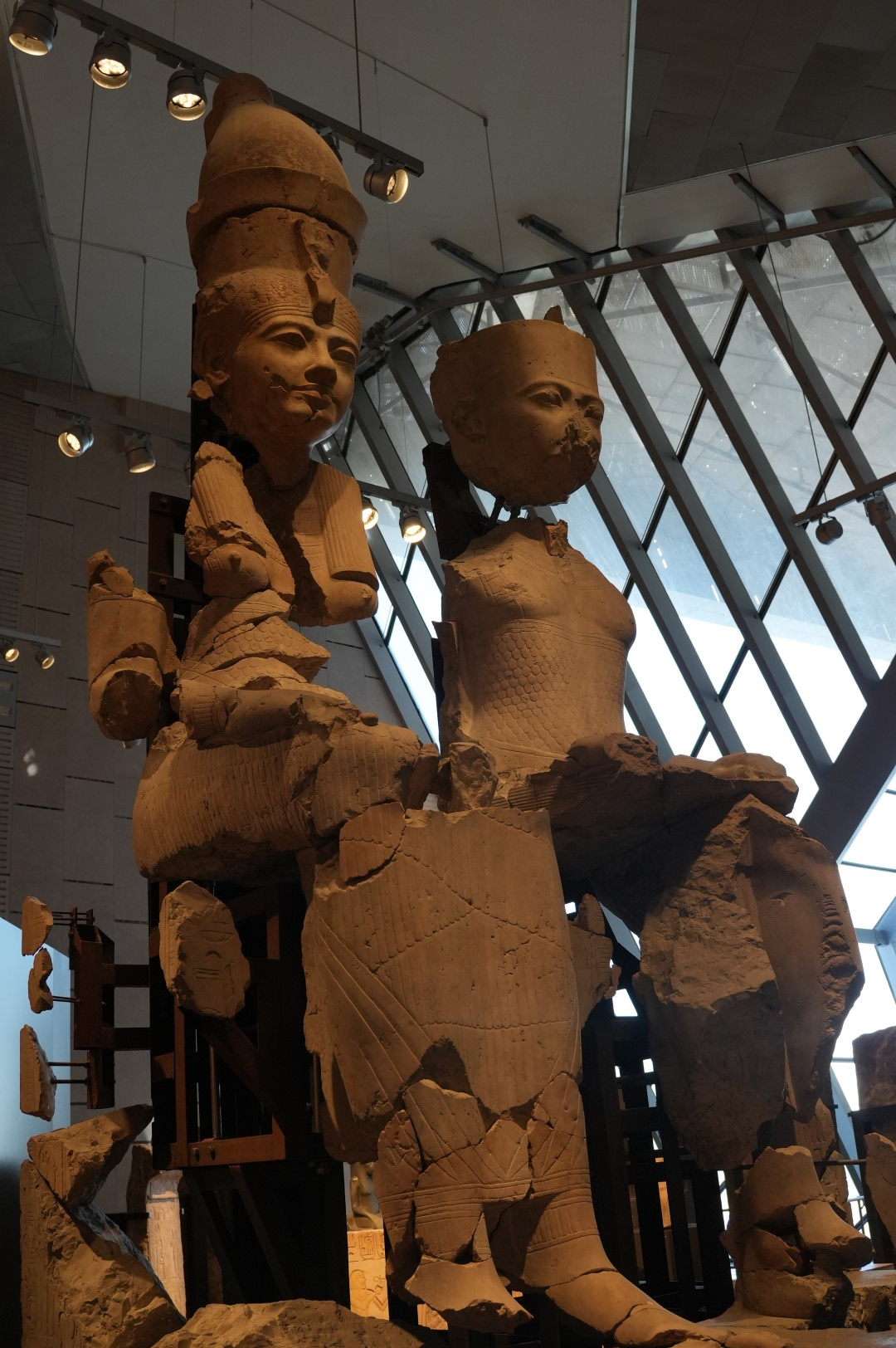
Monumental Dyad representing Amun and Mut from Karnak, with features of Tutankhamun and Ankhesenamun

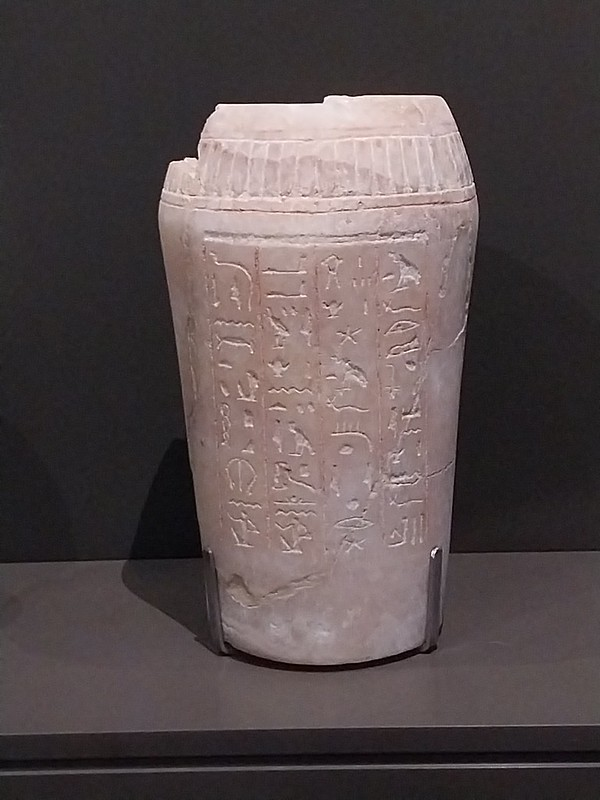
Caniopic jar of Amun-her-khepeshef

The oldest royal jewellery of Ancient Egypt from king Djer's tomb

== See also ==
- Egyptian Museum
- List of museums in Egypt
- List of museums of Egyptian antiquities
