= Heneghan Peng Architects =

Architecture firm

- Type: Limited Company
- Industry: Architecture
- Founded: 1999
- Headquarters: Dublin, Ireland
- Key people: Róisín Heneghan, Shih-Fu Peng
- Number of employees: 27
- Website: www.hparc.com

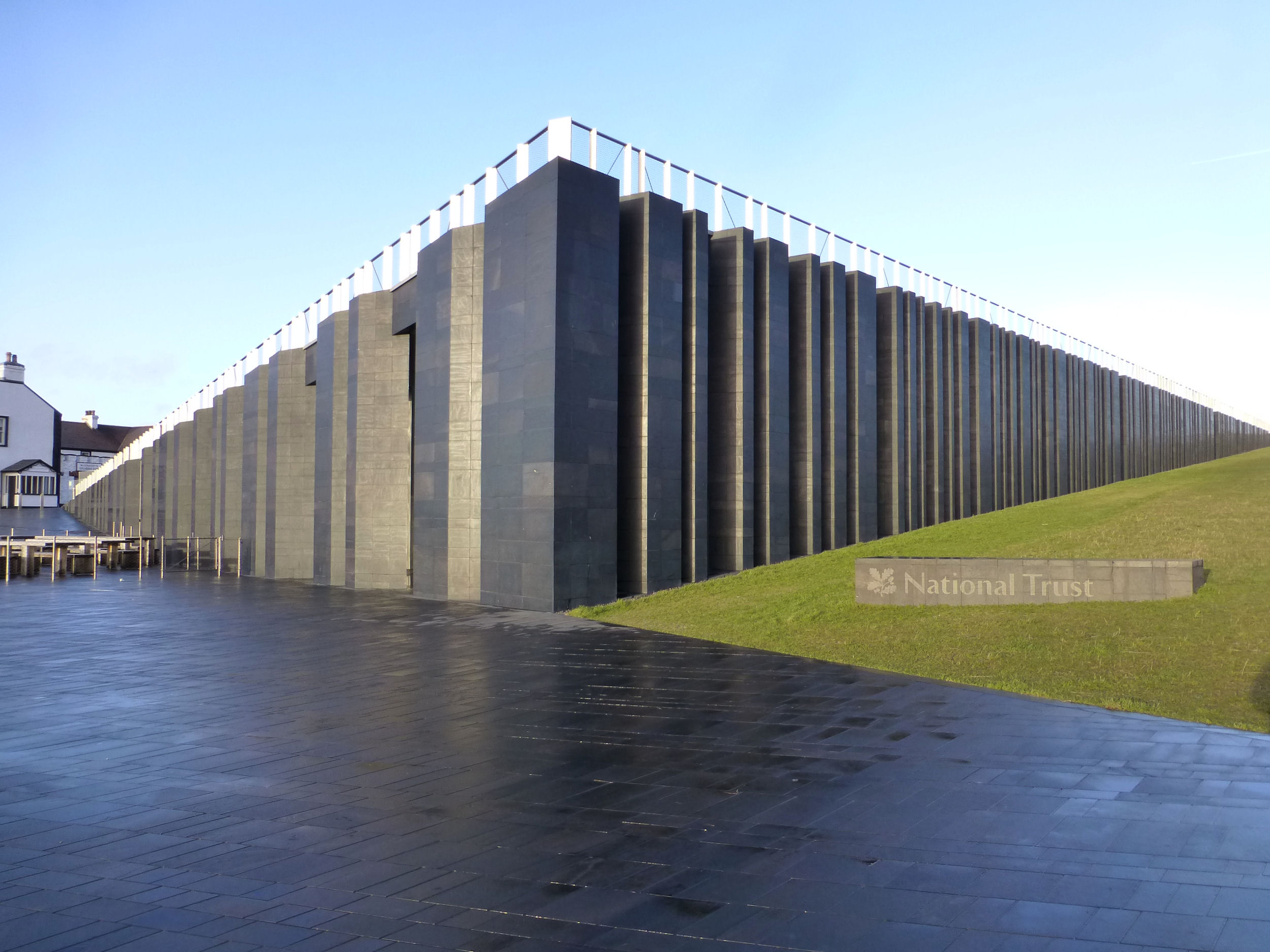
Visitor’s centre in Giant’s Causeway that was designed by HPARC.

The Heneghan Peng Architects (HPARC) architecture firm was founded by Róisín Heneghan and Shih-Fu Peng. The company was established in New York in 1999, but moved to Dublin in 2001 and is, as of 2021, based in Dublin and Berlin.

It has won many significant commissions, including the Grand Egyptian Museum, Áras Chill Dara in Kildare, Ireland, the Giant's Causeway Visitors' Centre, and new footbridges at the London Olympic Park. To win the Grand Egyptian Museum project, the firm won a design competition with 1,557 entries, despite having only three staff members at the time.

In 2009, the company won three competitions: for the Arabsat headquarters in Saudi Arabia, the Mittelrheinbruecke competition to build a bridge over the Rhine between St. Goar and St. Goarshausen in Germany, and the competition to design a new library and academic building for the University of Greenwich in London. The building sits within a UNESCO World Heritage Site and is home to both the Department of Architecture & Landscape and the Department of Creative Professions & Digital Arts in London.

== Awards ==
- The Áras Chill Dara project in Kildare, won a 2006 RIBA European Award.
- The Giant's Causeway Visitors' Centre won a RIBA National Award and was nominated for the RIBA Stirling Prize in 2013. It was also shortlisted for the 2013 Mies van der Rohe Award.
- 2019 Aga Khan Award for Architecture for their design of the Palestinian Museum.
