= Róisín Heneghan =

Irish architect and designer

- Born: 1963 (age 62–63); Belmullet, County Mayo
- Education: University College of Dublin; Harvard University
- Occupation: Architect
- Practice: Heneghan Peng Architects
- Projects: Áras Chill Dara, School of Architecture and Learning Centre, Greenwich University, Giant's Causeway Visitor Centre, Grand Museum of Egypt

Róisín Heneghan is an Irish architect and designer. She is co-founder of Heneghan Peng Architects along with her husband Shi-Fu Peng. The company was established in New York in 1999 but moved to Dublin in 2001. In 2014, she was shortlisted for Architects' Journal Woman Architect of the Year. In 2024, she was inducted into Aosdána.

== Education ==
Róisín Heneghan received a Bachelor of Architecture (1987) from the University College of Dublin and holds a Master of Architecture from Harvard University.

== Projects ==
- The Palestinian Museum, Palestine, May 2016
- Airbnb's European Operations Hub, Dublin, 2014
- Irish Pavilion, Venice Bienalle, 2011
- Giant's Causeway Visitor Centre
- Grand Egyptian Museum, Cairo

== Awards ==
- American Institute of Architects Award, 2001
- "Young Architects Forum" Architectural League of New York, 1999
- Boston Society of Architects Unbuilt Project Awards, 1998
- UCD Alumni Award English & Architecture 2020
