= Ahmed Hassan Said =

Egyptian businessman and political figure

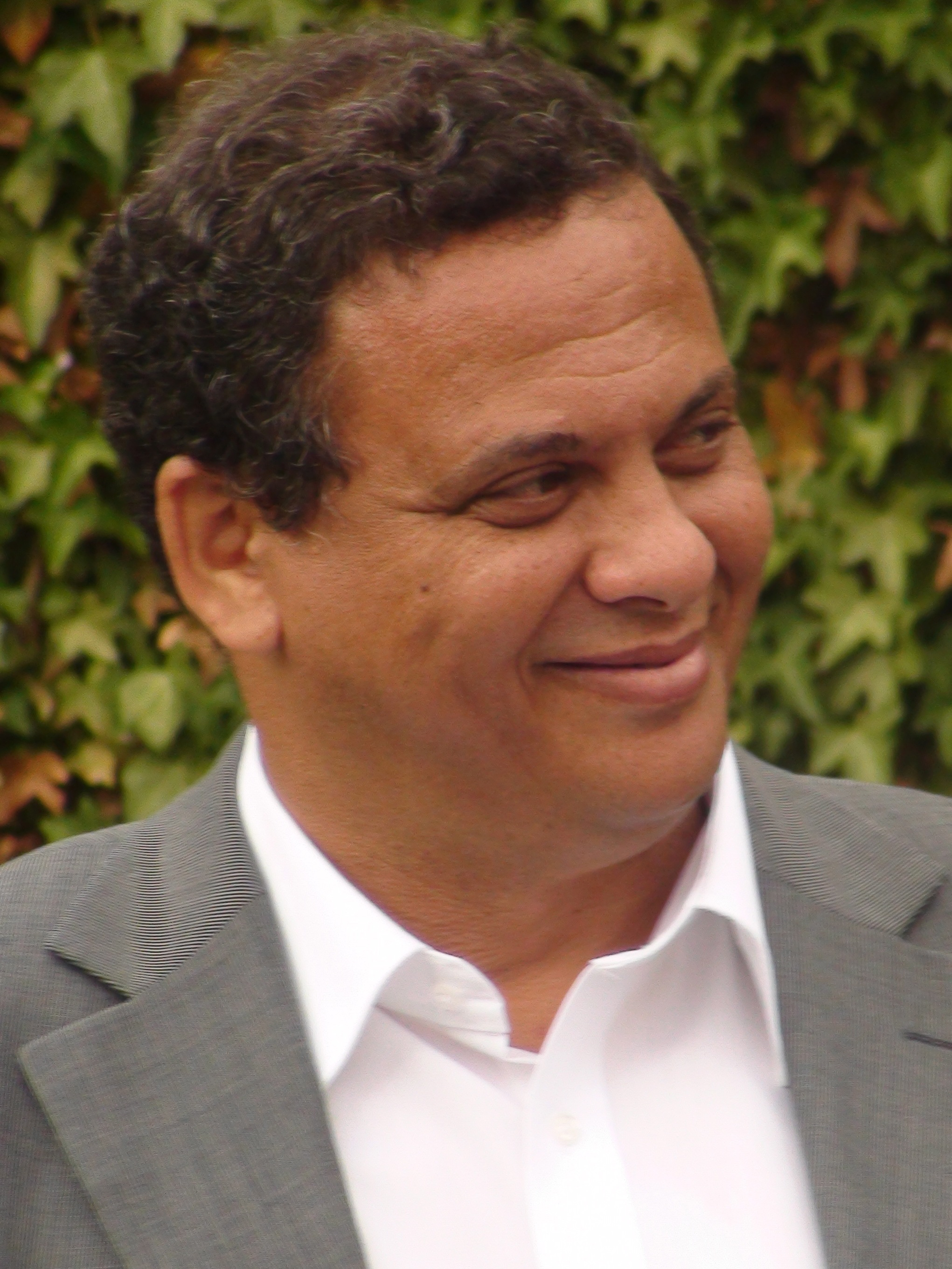

Chairman of the Free Egyptians Party
- In office May 2013 – September 2014
- Preceded by: Office created
- Succeeded by: Essam Khalil

Vice President of Al Ahly SC
- In office 28 April 2014 – 2018

Personal details
- Born: 28 December 1961 (age 64) Cairo, Egypt
- Party: Free Egyptians Party
- Education: American University in Cairo
- Profession: Businessman

Ahmed Hassan Said (Arabic: أحمد حسن سعيد, romanized: Aḥmad Ḥasan Saʻīd) is a prominent Egyptian businessman in the IT sector and has become a leading political figure as a result of the Arab Spring uprising and the ouster of former President Hosni Mubarak. Said was at Tahrir Square when the Egyptian Revolution of 2011 started.

== Personal life ==
Said was born in Cairo, Egypt, on 28 December 1961, to Eng. Hassan Saeed and Faten Fathi. He has a younger brother, Hisham Said.

In 1979, he obtained his General Certificate of Education diploma from Dar El Tifl School in Cairo. In 1985, he received his bachelor's degree in Political Science from The American University in Cairo (AUC). At AUC Said was elected President of the Student Union.

Said showed signs of early talent in swimming. He was able to win the Open Championship of Egypt at the age of 15. He later dominated the 100m Butterfly stroke event on both the local Arab and African level from 1977 until 1984, when he stopped competing. His African record remained unbroken until 1987. His swimming career was crowned by representing Egypt at the 1984 Summer Olympics in Los Angeles.

In 1988, he went on to earn an MSc in Public Policy from the London School of Economics. He completed his PhD from Cairo University in 2002.

Ahmed is married to Nivert El Sherif whose great-uncle is the Egyptian “Dean of Arabic Literature” Dr. Taha Hussein. They have two daughters and one son. One of their daughters is the Egyptian soprano Fatma Said. The other is called Aisha and also lives in Berlin.

== Career ==
Said has extensive experience in planning and management consultancy. His areas of expertise also include local government, decentralization and Management Information Systems Development. During his work with the Egyptian Cabinet from 1994 to 1998 he managed the national illiteracy project.

In 1997, along with his brother Hisham, a former IBM executive, Said founded the Global Brands Group, an IT company that has become one of Egypt's leading technology providers. The company partners with such major IT firms as Microsoft, Dell, Hewlett-Packard, Avaya, and others.

Said was one of the founders of the Free Egyptians Party (FEP), which was founded in April 2011 and is backed by leading business, political, and cultural leaders. FEP supports the principles of a liberal, democratic, and secular political order in post-Mubarak Egypt.

Said was the first president of FEP and was elected in May 2013. He resigned from the position in September 2014.

He also played a key role in the creation of the Egyptian Bloc. He won a seat in the parliamentary election of 28–29 November 2011. Said participated in FEP's political rally of 9 October 2011 among the Maspero demonstrations that led to the massacre of many protesters. He was injured and hospitalized as a result of the military's action against the demonstrators. He was also key in forming the National Salvation Front and was its secretary-general July 2013 to January 2014 after Mohamed ElBaradei stepped down from being the coordinator-general of the Front.
