= Ahmed Saad Al-Azhari =

British Islamic scholar

Shaykh, Dr Ahmed Saad al-Azhari
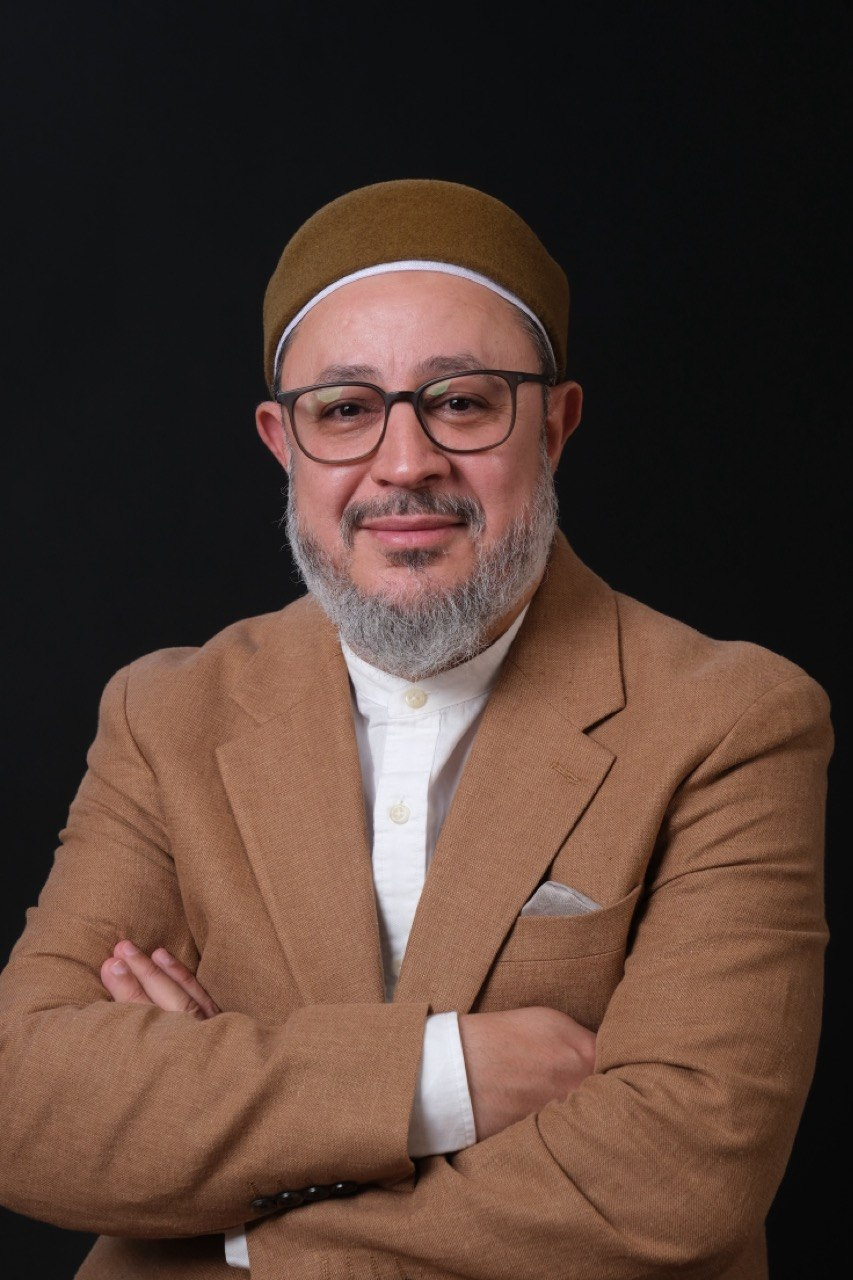
- Saad at the Doha Debates 2026 in Toronto, Canada

Academic background
- Thesis: Examining A Post-Colonial Neo-Traditionalist Response to Modernity: The Case of Abu Bakr al-Mashhūr (1947-2022)

Academic work
- Main interests: Arabic, Fiqh, Quranic Studies, Islamic Thought, Tasawwuf
- Notable works: Contemplating the Quran
- Website: https://www.ihsaninstitute.co.uk

Personal life
- Region: United Kingdom
- Education: University of Birmingham, Al-Azhar University

Religious life
- Religion: Islam
- Denomination: Sunni
- Founder of: Ihsan Institute
- Jurisprudence: Maliki
- Creed: Ash'ari

Ahmed Saad Al-Azhari (Arabic: أحمد سعد الأزهري), is an Egyptian born, British Islamic scholar, and is the founder of the Ihsan Institute. He is an advocate of teaching traditional Islamic sciences; which he has taught in various parts of the world.

== Early life ==
Saad was born in the northern Egyptian Governorate of Monufiya. His father was a scholar who graduated from Al-Azhar University, Egypt – faculty of Arabic Language. Their family are descendants from the Prophet Mohammad through the grandson Hasan ibn Ali.

== Education ==
Shaykh Ahmed Saad completed the memorisation of the Qur’an at the age of ten, and studied basic Arabic and Islamic sciences at the hands of his father. He delivered his first Friday sermon at the age of 15, and led his first prayer at the age of 13. He memorized Alfiyyah of Ibn Malik at the age of 13 and Riyadh As-Salihin of An-Nawawi at the age of 15. He committed thousands of lines of poetry and prose to memory. He has memorized texts on logic, tajwid, aqidah, Arabic, rhetoric, and studied Maliki fiqh under Shaykh Abdul-Hamid Āl Al-Shaykh Mubarak of Ahsa and many other sciences. He also holds one of the highest chains of the Qur'an among his peers with 29 people between him and the prophet Muhammad.

In 1988, he enrolled into Al-Azhar system of schools where he graduated with a B.A. (Hons) in Islamic Studies in English, from the Al-Azhar University in 2001. Throughout his career, Shaykh Ahmed Saad has studied Islamic sciences with scholars such as: former Grand Mufti of Egypt, Shaykh Dr. Ali Gomaa, Habib Abu Bakr Al-Adniy Al-Masyhūr and Habib Umar bin Hafidz.

In 2024, Shaykh Ahmed Saad received a Doctor of Philosophy from the School of Philosophy, Theology and Religion at the University of Birmingham on Traditionalist Muslim scholars’ engagement with modernity through studying Habib Abu Bakr Al-Adniy Al-Masyhūr’s intellectual project. In his Thesis, Dr. Ahmed Saad challenged the current academic characterisation of traditional Muslim responses to modernity as obstructionist, disengaging and revanchist and thus overlooked. Through rigorous analysis of both the biography and intellectual core works of Habib Abu Bakr Al-Adniy Al-Masyhūr, Dr. Ahmed Saad revealed diversity within those responses, an emerging decolonial narrative that calls for non-Eurocentric modernity that goes beyond the rhetorical question of “what went wrong”, and adopted pragmatic conservative and negotiating tone. Dr. Ahmed Saad has also highlighted Habib Abu Bakr Al-Adniy Al-Masyhūr’s genius approach that sees the constituents of the tradition as four; adding Fiqh At-Tahawwulāt (understanding transitions and changes), as an alternative analytical framework of reading history, to the archetypal three components of Islam, iman and ihsan that have been seen as the only components of the tradition. This expansion of the tradition's components shows its potential to decolonise Muslim psychology and epistemology and proves its relevance and ability to the challenge of colonial modernity.

== Career ==
In 2005, Saad travelled to teach Islamic Sciences in the US, Germany and Canada. He received an invitation from the University of California, Santa Barbara to participate in a programme on understanding religious pluralism, funded by the U.S. Department of State's Bureau of Educational and Cultural Affairs.

In 2007, Saad settled in the UK after being appointed the Imam of the North London Central Mosque. The mosque was previously known as the Finsbury Park mosque, which gained notoriety when the extremist preacher Abu Hamza al Masri was the Imam of the mosque. During Saad's time as Imam, he served on the panel of various interfaith forums, and delivered community projects tackling extremism. Since Saad's appointment, it was reported that his efforts have brought greater diversity to the mosques worshipers, and played an important part in successfully integrating local Muslims into London life. Saad's efforts at the Finsbury Park Mosque were recognised by the current Labour Party leader Jeremy Corbyn and MP Catherine West.

Saad was appointed as a Senior Imam at Palmers Green Mosque in London in 2012 where he taught traditional Islamic sciences and served as the principle khatib of the Friday sermon.

Saad currently is the founder and Director of the Ihsan Institute. "

== Ihsan Institute ==
In addition to various appointments as resident Imam and Scholar at a number of institutions, Saad founded the Ihsan Institute in 2013. The institute’s aim is "to create a balanced, motivating, engaging and genuine understanding of Islam in both Muslim and non-Muslim communities, and to provide real scholarship that realises the quality and the reality." The flagship course the Ihsan Institute offers is known as the ‘Al-Husna Certificate in Traditional Islamic Studies’. This course is delivered by Saad.

== Views ==
Saad has been known for his interfaith work, promotion of tolerance, and peaceful co-existence. He is featured as part of the Alliance of the Middle Way – a UK based not-for-profit organisation that rejects extremism and promotes return to tradition and its diversity. Other individuals from the Islamic scholarly community who are also featured are Timothy Winter and Abdallah Bin Bayyah.

In April 2012, Saad appeared on Doha Debates forum which is aired on the BBC World Service. The debate was entitled "This House believes Arab governments need to take urgent measures to protect religious minorities", where Saad argued for the motion, and expressed the need for stable democratic, pluralistic Arab governments. Saad also mentioned that extreme interpretations of Islam have resulted from a disregard for the authority in the main, qualified Islamic institutions e.g. Al-Azhar University.

== Publications ==
Books authored

- Lamlamaat min nafahaat ahl Al-Iraadaat: a poetry anthology (2015).
- Contemplating the Quran: A Thematic thirty part Commentary on the Noble Quran (2017).
- Al-Badiah Nazm al-Awamil al-Mi'ah: A poetic summary of Al-Jurjani's 100 Grammatical agents (2017).
- Forty Parables of the Qur'an (2025)
- Surat Al-Hujurāt: From Particulars to Universals (forthcoming).
- Muwāsalāt min Suhi Ahlil Irādāt: A Poetry Anthology (forthcoming).
- Fifty Inspiring Biographies of Fifty Scholars Who Died Before Fifty Years of Age (forthcoming).
- A Hundred Scholars from Menoufiyyah (forthcoming).

Translations

- Habib Abu Bakr al-Mashhur, An-Nubdha As-Sughra (2016).
