= Rafael Aguirre =

Spanish guitarist

Rafael Aguirre Miñarro
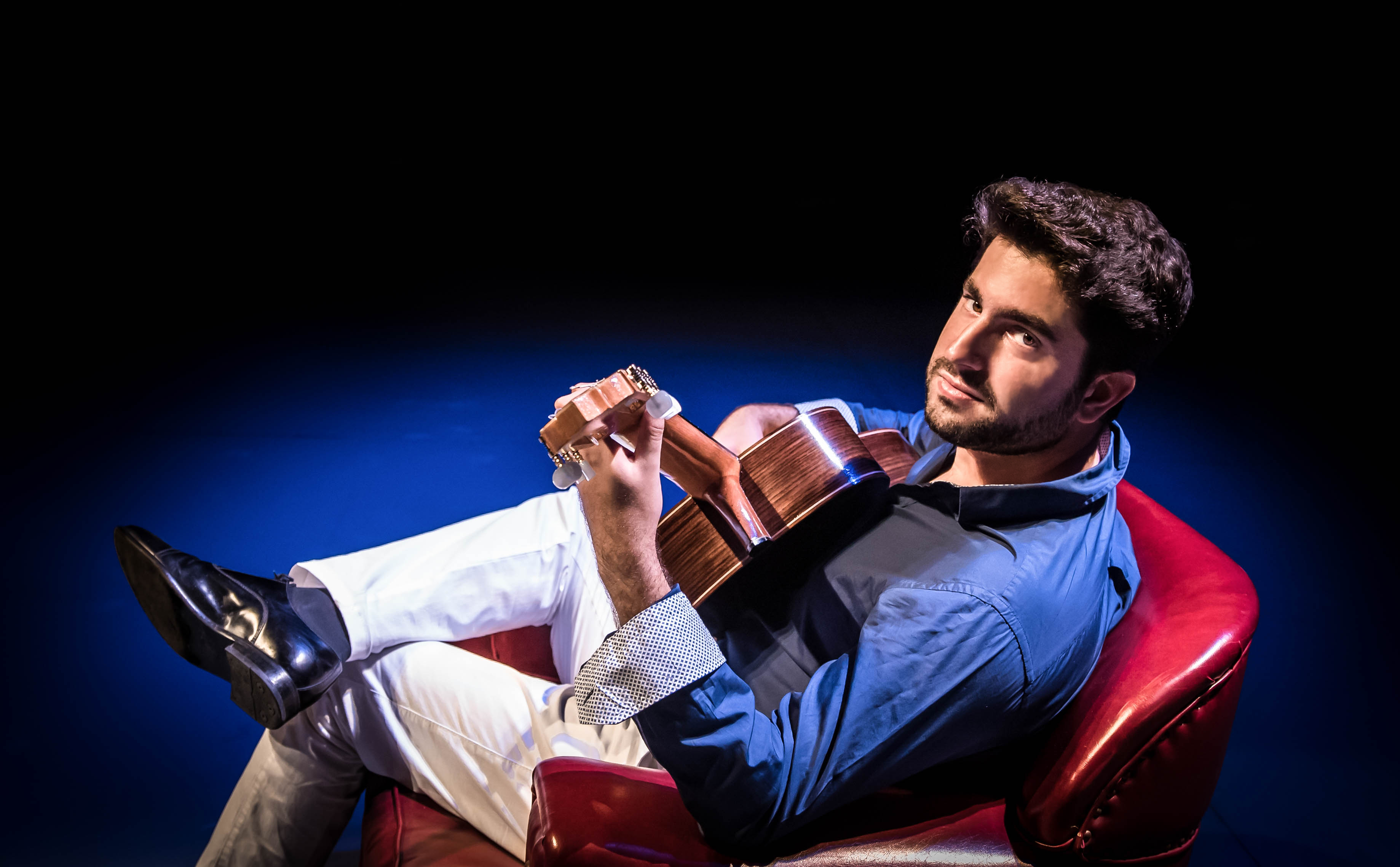
- Born: December 12, 1984 (age 41); Málaga, Spain
- Occupation: Classical Guitarist

Rafael Aguirre (1984) is a Spanish classical guitarist.

== Career ==
Málaga-born Aguirre is a musician known for his work as a classical guitarist. He has performed in 40 countries, acting in world famous spaces such as the Carnegie Hall in New York, Konzerthaus of Viena,Palacio de la Música Catalana, Teatro Real de Madrid, Musashino Swing Hall in Tokio, the Elbphilharmonie in Hamburg, and Auditorio Nacional de Madrid.

Rafael Aguirre has performed as a soloist with the KBS Symphony Orchestra in Korea, the Lyon National Orchestra, the Bruckner Orchestra of Linz, the RTVE Symphony Orchestra, the Spanish National Orchestra, among others.

At the age of 16, he made his orchestral debut with the Malaga Youth Orchestra on a tour of Spain and Morocco.. He studied in Germany at the Robert Schumann University of Music in Düsseldorf. Later, he studied with Professor Michael Lewin at the Royal Academy of Music in London. He was recently elected to the Royal Academy of Music's Honours Roll as an Associate Member.
