= List of surviving ancient ships =

This is a list of surviving ships from the ancient or prehistoric era. All the ships on this list date to 5th century AD or before.

| Name | Image | Year of construction | Type | Build location (Note: Area of origin) | Current location | Overall length |
|---|---|---|---|---|---|---|
| Pesse canoe | | 8040–7510 BC | Dugout canoe | Mesolithic Europe | Netherlands (Assen) | 9.75 ft (2.97 m) |
| Dufuna canoe | —N/a | 6550 BC | Dugout canoe | Neolithic Africa | Nigeria (Yobe State) | 28 ft (8.5 m) |
| Bibongho canoe | —N/a | 6000 BC | Dugout canoe | Prehistoric Korea | South Korea (Gimhae) | 10.17 ft (3.10 m) |
| Monoxiles della Marmotta | —N/a | 5620–5300 BC | Dugout canoe | Neolithic Europe | Italy (Museo delle Civiltà, Roma) | 34.21 ft (10.43 m) |
| Lake Mendota Canoes | | 3200 BC–1300 AD | Numerous dugout canoes made varyingly from elm and oak | United States (Lake Mendota) | United States (Madison) | —N/a |
| Pirogues de Bercy | | 4500 BC | Dugout canoes | Neolithic France | France (Musée Carnavalet) | 17.00 ft (5.18 m) |
| Dugout Canoe of Gué de Beaulieu | | 3500–3000 BC | Dugout canoe | Neolithic France | France (Musée de Cognac) | 18.56 ft (5.66 m) |
| Khufu ship | | 2500 BC | Solar ship, sewn boat construction | Ancient Egypt | Egypt (Giza) | 142 ft (43 m) |
| Cooper River Canoe | —N/a | Archaic period (Note: Carbon-14 dated to 4170 BP (+/- 60)) | Dugout canoe | United States | United States (Warren Lasch Conservation Center) | 19.6 ft (6.0 m) |
| Lurgan Canoe | | 2000 BC | Dugout canoe | Prehistoric Ireland | Ireland (Dublin) | 50 ft (15 m) |
| Ferriby 3 | | 2030–1780 BC | Sewn boat (wooden planks stitched together with cord) | Bronze Age Britain | United Kingdom, Hull museums (not on display) | 7.7 m (25 ft) keel plank, interpreted as a hull length of 15.28 m (50.1 ft) |
| Carnegie boat | —N/a | 1870–1831 BC | Solar ship | Ancient Egypt | United States (Pittsburgh) | 32.8 ft (10.0 m) |
| Chicago boat | | 1870–1831 BC | Solar ship | Ancient Egypt | United States (Chicago) | 32.8 ft (10.0 m) |
| Red boat (Note: Its official name is GC 4926) | | 1870–1831 BC | Solar ship | Ancient Egypt | Egypt (Sharm El-Sheikh Museum) | 32.8 ft (10.0 m) |
| White boat (Note: Its official name is GC 4925) | | 1870–1831 BC | Solar ship | Ancient Egypt | Egypt (Sharm El-Sheikh Museum) | 32.8 ft (10.0 m) |
| Appleby logboat | —N/a | 1500–1300 BC | Logboat | Prehistoric Britain | United Kingdom (North Lincolnshire Museum) | —N/a |
| Dover Bronze Age Boat | | 1500 BC | Seagoing boat, sewn boat with integral cleats for constructional lashings | Prehistoric Britain | United Kingdom (Dover) | 31 ft (9.4 m) (Note: Extant length) |
| Hanson Log Boat | | 1500 BC | Logboat | Prehistoric Britain | United Kingdom (Derby) | 32 ft (10 m) |
| Zambratija boat | | 1200–1000 BC | Sewn boat | Croatia | France, Grenoble (not on display) | 39 ft (12 m) |
| Carpow Logboat | | 1000 BC | Logboat | Prehistoric Britain | United Kingdom (Perth) | 29 ft (8.8 m) |
| Second Lake Mendota canoe | —N/a | 1000 BC | Dugout canoe | United States (Lake Mendota) | United States (Madison) | 14.5 ft (4.4 m) |
| Ljubljana Marshes dugout canoe | | 9th century BC | Dugout canoe | Slovenia | Slovenia (Ljubljana) | 30.5 ft (9.3 m) |
| Hasholme Logboat | | 750–390 BC | Logboat | Prehistoric Britain | United Kingdom (Hull) | 42.3 ft (12.9 m) |
| Mazarrón I | | 7th century BC | Merchant ship | Phoenicia | Spain (Cartagena) | suviving fragments |
| Mazarrón II | | 7th century BC | Merchant ship | Phoenicia | Spain (Cartagena) | 26.5 ft (8.1 m) |
| Marseille 3 | | 525–500 BC | Fishing vessel | France | France (Marseille) | 16.4 ft (5.0 m) |
| Marseille 4 | | 525–500 BC | Sailing vessel | Ancient Greece | France (Marseille) | 45.9 ft (14.0 m) |
| Ma'agan Michael ship | | 5th century BC | Trade ship | Palaestina Prima | Israel (Ma'agan Michael) | 37 ft (11 m) |
| Fiskerton log boat | | 457–300 BC | Logboat | Prehistoric Britain | United Kingdom (Lincoln) | 23 ft (7.0 m) |
| Hjortspring boat | | 400–300 BC | Canoe | Unknown (Nordic tribal area) | Denmark (Copenhagen) | 58 ft (18 m) |
| Kyrenia ship | | 400–300 BC | Trade ship | Ancient Greece | Cyprus (Kyrenia) | 47 ft (14 m) |
| Mohelnice monoxyl | | 3rd century BC (Note: 400–50 AD) | Dugout canoe | Czech Republic | Czech Republic (Olomouc) | 34.4 ft (10.5 m) |
| Poole Logboat | | 300 BC | Logboat | Prehistoric Britain | United Kingdom (Poole) | 33 ft (10 m) |
| Marsala Punic shipwreck | | 235 BC | Warship | Ancient Carthage | Italy (Sicily) | 115 ft (35 m) |
| Silk Road No.1 | | 202 BC - 220 AD | Riverboat | Han dynasty | People's Republic of China (Weiqiao site, Xi'an) | 9.71 m (31.9 ft) |
| Sea of Galilee Boat | | 120 BC–50 AD | Fishing boat | Ancient Rome | Israel (Ginosar) | 27 ft (8.2 m) |
| Comacchio wreck | | 1st century BC | Cargo vessel | Ancient Rome | Italy (Palazzo Bellini) | 68.89 ft (21.00 m) |
| Zwammerdam 3 | | 1st century BC–1st century AD | Canoe | Ancient Rome | Netherlands (Archeon) | 34.9 ft (10.6 m) |
| Alkedo | | 1st century AD | Pleasure craft | Ancient Rome | Italy (Pisa) | 72 ft (22 m) |
| Arles Rhône 3 | | 1st century AD | Trade ship | Ancient Rome | France (Arles) | 102 ft (31 m) |
| Marseille 5 | | 1st–2nd century AD | Coastal working boat | Ancient Rome | France (Marseille) | 52.4 ft (16.0 m) |
| Marseille 6 | | 1st–2nd century AD | Coastal working boat | Ancient Rome | France (Marseille) | 49.2 ft (15.0 m) |
| Pommeroeul 1 | | 1st–2nd century AD | Barge | Ancient Rome | Belgium (Ath) | 39.3 ft (12.0 m) |
| Pommeroeul 2 | | 1st century AD | Dugout canoe | Ancient Rome | Belgium (Ath) | 65.6 ft (20.0 m) |
| Zwammerdam 2 | | 80–200 AD | Cargo vessel | Ancient Rome | Netherlands (Archeon) | 74.63 ft (22.75 m) |
| Mainz 6 | | 81 AD | Barge | Ancient Rome | Germany (Mainz) | 13.7 ft (4.2 m) |
| Oberstimm 1 | | 100 AD | Military vessel | Ancient Rome | Germany (Manching) | 49 ft (15 m) |
| Oberstimm 2 | | 100 AD | Military vessel | Ancient Rome | Germany (Manching) | 50.5 ft (15.4 m) |
| Barchino F | | 2nd century AD | Boat | Ancient Rome | Italy (Pisa) | 29.5 ft (9.0 m) |
| Ship A | | 2nd century AD | Shipping vessel | Ancient Rome | Italy (Pisa) | 98 ft (30 m) (Note: 32.8 ft (10 m) section preserved) |
| De Meern 1 | | 148 AD | Barge | Ancient Rome | Netherlands (De Meern) | 82 ft (25 m) |
| Bourse Roman shipwreck | | 160–220 AD | Merchant ship | Ancient Rome | France (Marseille) | 75.4 ft (23.0 m) |
| Bevaix boat | | 182 AD | Trade ship | Ancient Rome | Switzerland (Laténium) | 63.6 ft (19.40 m) |
| Mainz 3 | | 191 AD | Patrol vessel | Ancient Rome | Germany (Mainz) | 55.77 ft (17.00 m) |
| Marseille 7 | | 3rd century AD | Coastal working boat | Ancient Rome | France (Marseille) | —N/a |
| Roman ship of Marausa | | 3rd century AD | Merchant ship | Ancient Rome | Italy (Trapani) | 91.5 ft (27.9 m) |
| Mainz 2 | | 249 AD | Navis lusoria | Ancient Rome | Germany (Mainz) | 70.53 ft (21.50 m) |
| Björkebåten | | 4th century AD | Log boat | Sweden | Sweden (Gävle) | 23.68 ft (7.22 m) |
| Mainz 4 | | 4th century AD | Navis lusoria | Ancient Rome | Germany (Mainz) | 70.53 ft (21.50 m) |
| Nydam Boat | | 310–320 AD | Pre-Viking ship | Denmark (Nordic tribal area) | Germany (Gottorf Castle) | 76 ft (23 m) |
| Mainz 1 | | 385 AD | Navis lusoria | Ancient Rome | Germany (Mainz) | 70.53 ft (21.50 m) |
| Mainz 5 | | 395 AD | Navis lusoria | Ancient Rome | Germany (Mainz) | 70.53 ft (21.50 m) |
| Ship D | | 5th century AD | Barge | Ancient Rome | Italy (Pisa) | —N/a |
| Ship I | | 5th century AD | River ferry | Ancient Rome | Italy (Pisa) | —N/a |
| Chitimacha dugout canoe | —N/a | 450–620 AD | Dugout canoe | United States | United States (Texas A&M University Conservation Research Laboratory) | 14 ft (4.3 m) |

== See also ==
- Archaeology of shipwrecks
- Lists of ships
- Lists of shipwrecks
