= Pesse canoe =

Boat constructed during the early Mesolithic period

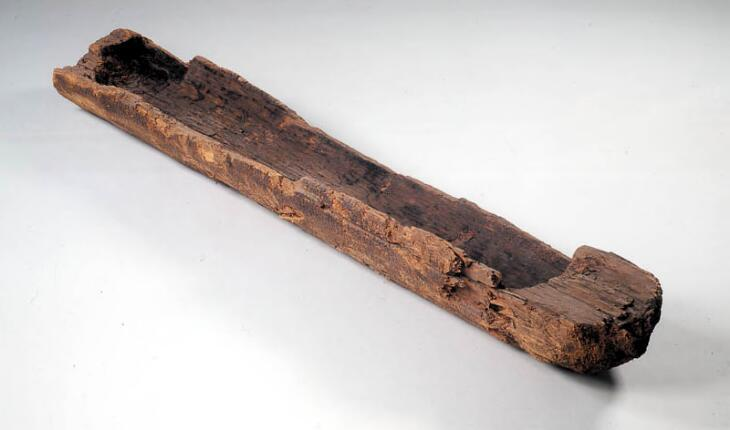
- The Pesse canoe
- Type: Dugout canoe
- Material: Scots pine
- Length: 298 centimetres (117 in)
- Width: 44 centimetres (17 in)
- Created: c. 8040–7510 BC
- Discovered: 1955 village of Pesse
- Present location: Drents Museum

The Pesse canoe is the world's oldest-known boat. Carbon dating indicates that the boat was constructed during the early Mesolithic period between 8040 BC and 7510 BC. It is now in the Drents Museum in Assen, Netherlands.

== Description ==
The boat is a dugout-style canoe measuring 298 centimetres (117 in) long and 44 centimetres (17 in) wide. It was made from a single Scots pine log. Marks are present in the cavity, likely made by flint or antler tools.

It was a suitable vehicle for inhabitants who spent much of their time hunting and fishing in a watery landscape of marshes, creeks and lakes. This is confirmed by another discovery in the region of the great rivers Maas, Rhine and Waal: graves, dating back to between 5500 and 5000 BC. Judging by the food remains near the grave, the group lived on the safe heights of river dunes while using their canoes to catch pike in the river, in addition to using flint arrows to shoot birds while gathering fruits, vegetables and nuts.

== History ==
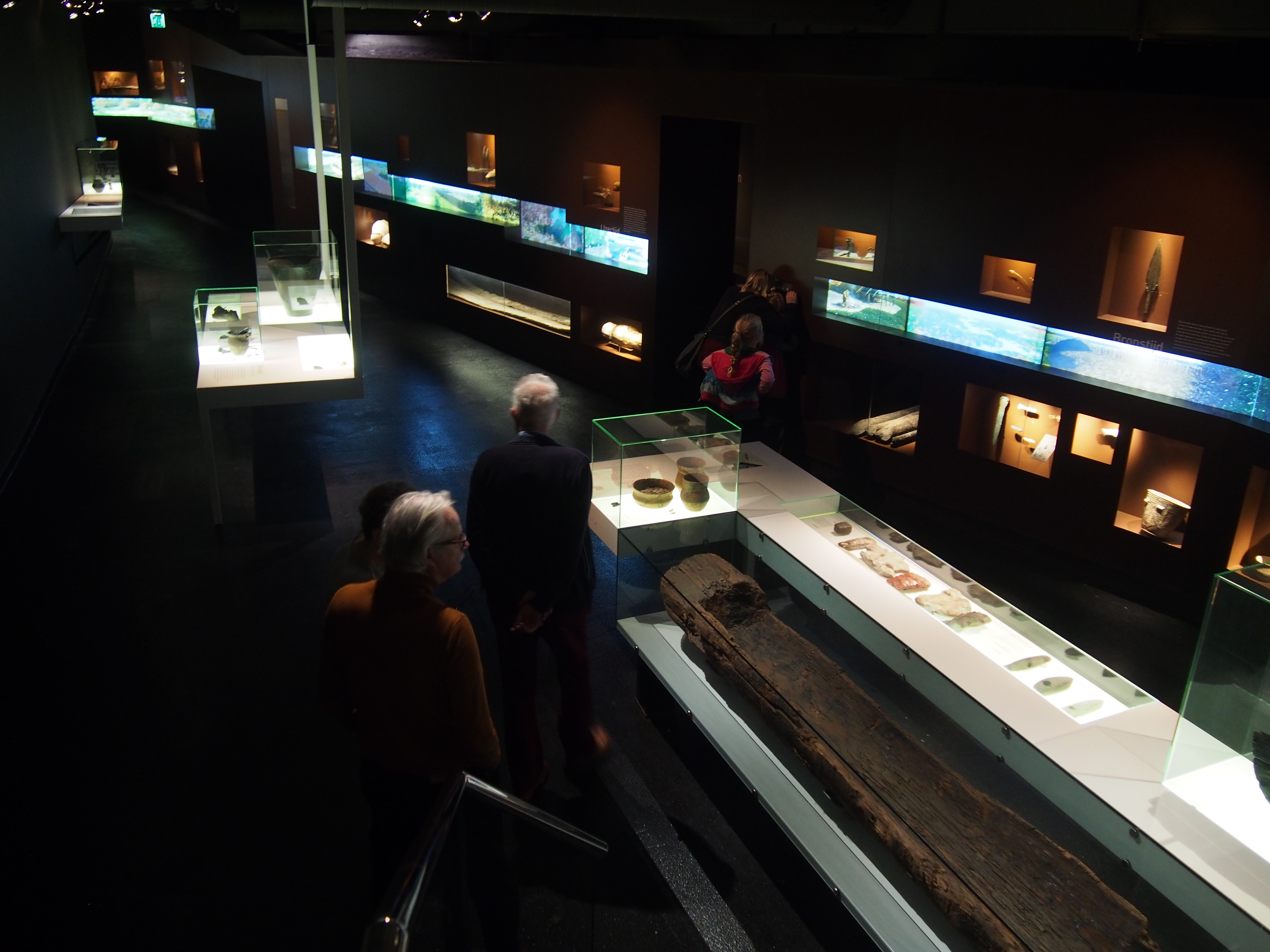
The Pesse canoe at the Drents Museum, 2019

The boat was discovered in 1955 during the construction of the Dutch A28 motorway. The route passes south of the village of Pesse in Hoogeveen through what was a peat bog. To construct the roadbed, the peat needed to be removed, and during excavation, a crane operator came across what he believed to be a tree trunk two metres (6 ft 7 in) below the surface. Local farmer Hendrik Wanders noticed the log and took it for further inspection. He gave the boat to the University of Groningen, where it was examined and freeze dried for preservation. It was later transferred to the Drents Museum, located near the discovery site.

== Debate ==
A visiting Danish archaeologist questioned whether such a small boat would be seaworthy. In 2001, an exact replica was constructed by archaeologist Jaap Beuker and successfully paddled by a canoeist, proving that it did in fact function as a boat.

Some also theorized that the find could have been another object, like an animal feeder. Beuker noted that animals were not kept by the people from the boat's era (in fact, no domesticated farm or work animals were kept anywhere in Europe during the Mesolithic), so it likely was not a trough. The boat is also similar in construction to prehistoric canoes found in other countries.

== See also ==
- List of surviving ancient ships
