= La Tène (archaeological site) =

Iron Age archaeological site in Switzerland

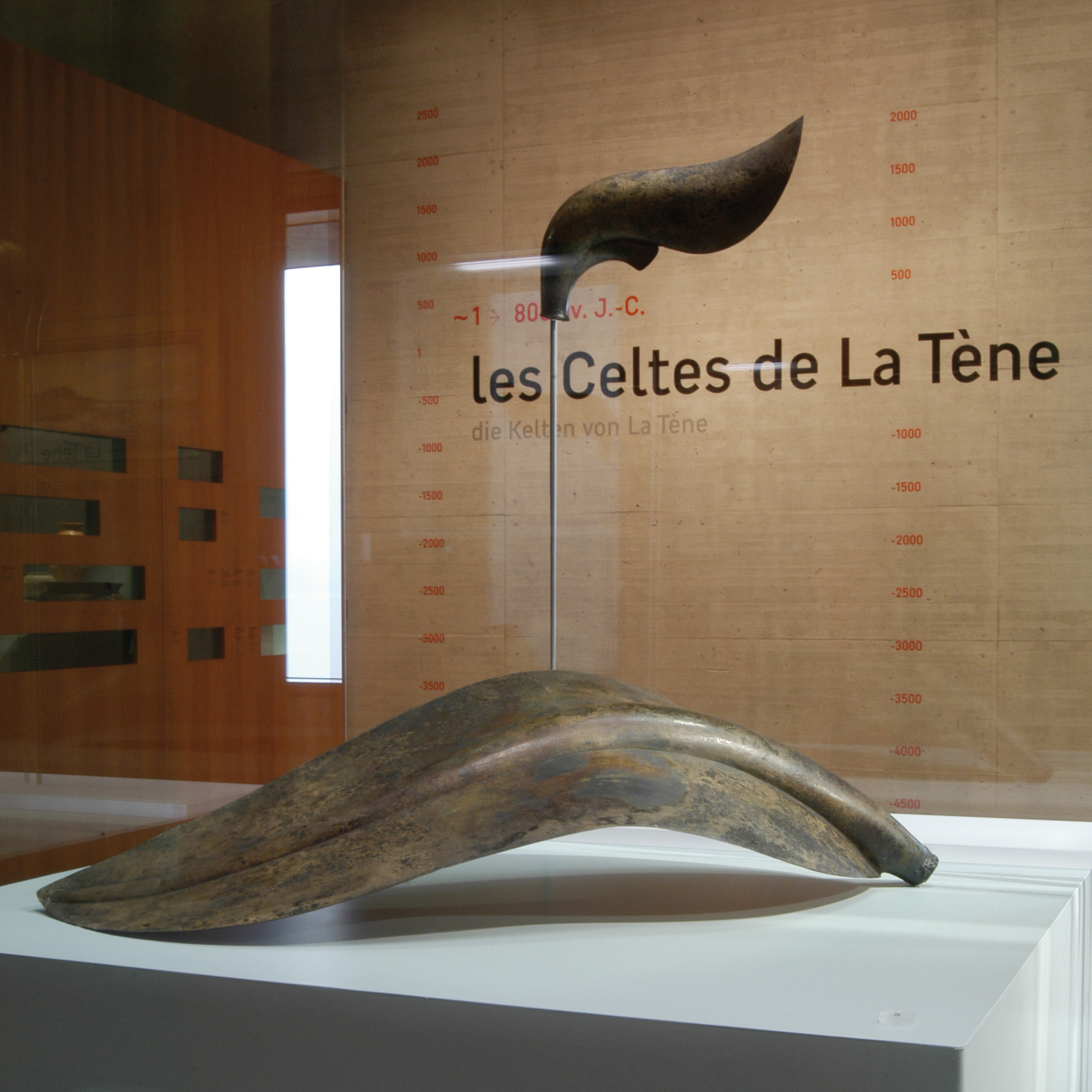
- Decorative part of a carnyx kept in the Laténium

- Location within Switzerland
- 47.006944°N 7.023611°E
- Location: Canton de Neuchâtel, Switzerland

History
- Built: Iron Age

La Tène is a protohistoric archaeological site on the northern shore of Lake Neuchâtel, Switzerland. Dating to the second part of the European Iron Age it is the type site of the La Tène culture, which dates to about 450 BCE to the 1st century BCE and extends from Ireland to Anatolia and from Portugal to Czechia. La Tène is listed as a property of national significance.

== Location ==
The site is located in the lieu-dit La Tène, which is related to the Latin tenuis evoking the shallow waters of the lake's northernmost extremity. It is also the point where the Thielle river leaves the lake and flows in the direction of lake Biel. Being constantly in the vicinity of the lake, the artifacts were marked by the changes in the lake level.

== Research history ==
=== Discovery ===
The site of La Tène was discovered in 1857 during a period dubbed the "lake dwelling fever" (in French: "fièvre lacustre"). Pile-dwellings were found on the banks of many Swiss lakes, most of the time with the collaboration of scientists and fishermen. In November 1857, fisherman Hans Kopp was sailing to a Neolithic dwelling near Concise from Lake Biel under orders from Colonel Friedrich Schwab when he spotted an interesting spot near La Tène. He stopped and started investigating, and within an hour he had found around forty iron objects, among which were eight spearheads and twelve swords. At that time, that is before the Jura water correction, the lake level was 2.7 m higher, and therefore, the site was 60 to 70 cm underwater. The discoveries made by Kopp went into Friedrich Schwab's private collection until his death, when they were given to the city of Biel/Bienne.

The first scholars studying the site, Colonel Friedrich Schwab and Ferdinand Keller, did not consider the site of particular interest. However, when Édouard Desor, professor of geology and paleontology, heard of the discoveries, around a year later, he immediately realised the potential of La Tène within the Three-age system. In 1866, the first International Congress of Anthropology and Prehistoric Archaeology took place in Neuchâtel, Desor advocated the site of La Tène as the reference for the prehistoric Iron Age. A few years later, during a later meeting of the congress in Stockholm, it was decided to divide the Iron Age in Europe in two periods. The first was labelled Hallstatt culture, from a site located in Austria. The second Iron Age (from around 450 BCE to 25 BCE) was named after the site of La Tène, and thus called the La Tène culture.

=== Early excavations (1880s–1917) ===
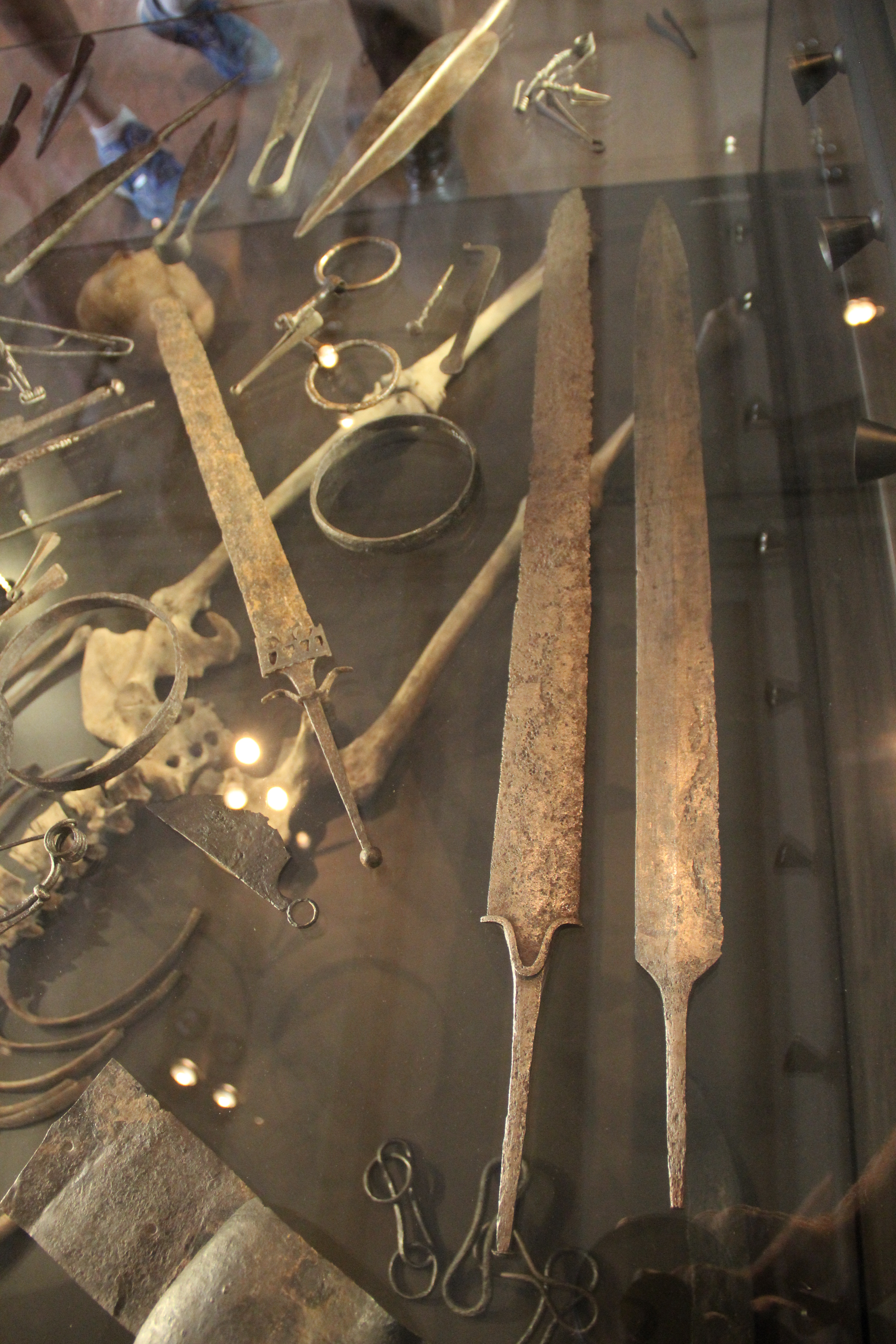
Lake depositions at La Tène

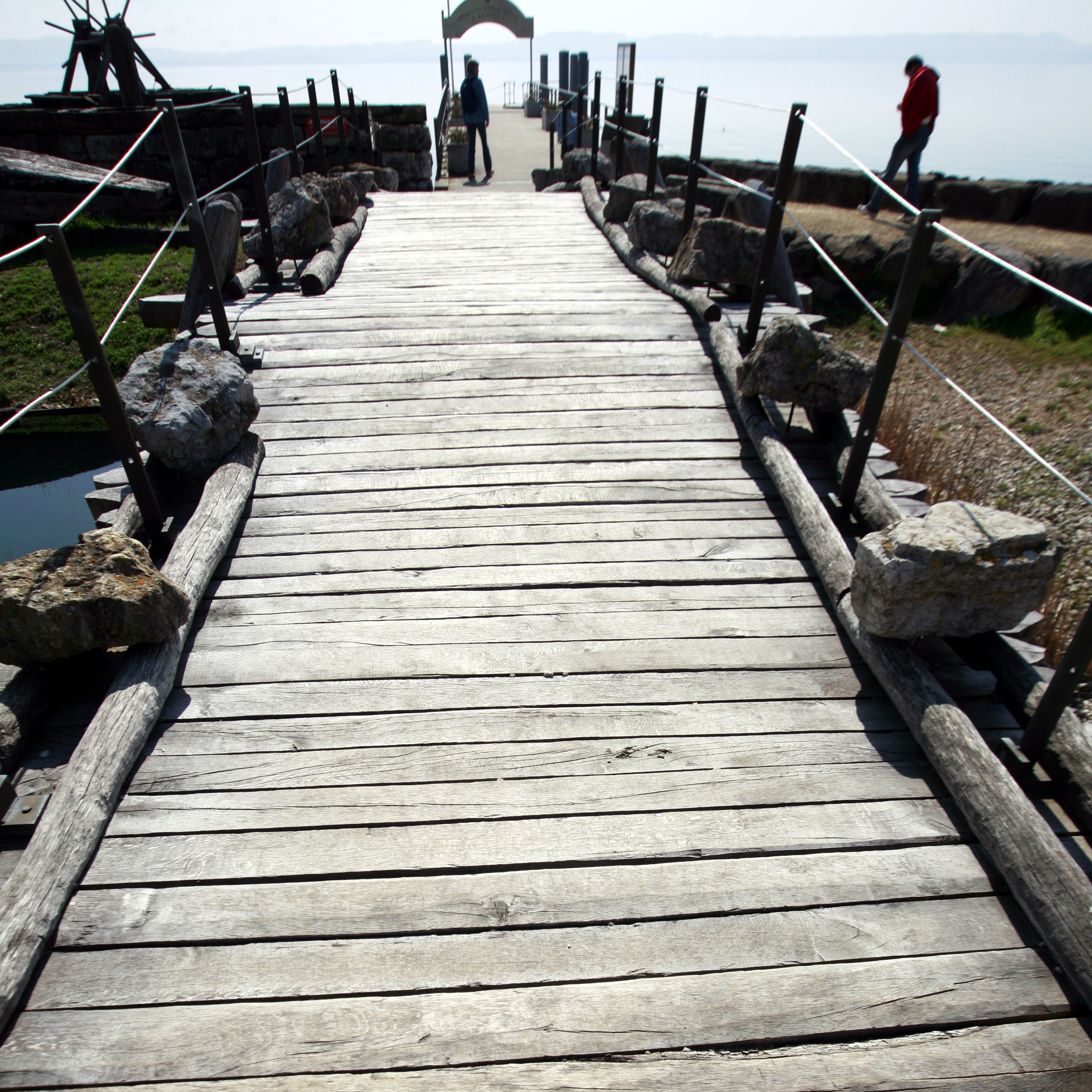
Reconstructed Celtic bridge at La Tène

The site was quickly noted for the quality of the artifacts that were found. After Desor and Schwab, La Tène attracted other archaeology amateurs like Alexis Dardel-Thorens and Victor Gross. It also attracted many looters. Around 1870, the first Jura water correction brought the lake level 2.7 m lower, and the site which was believed to be exhausted proved to have more to be found. With the lowered water, the site's topography became much easier to understand; this led to the discovery of the remains of two bridges over an old branch of the Thielle river as well as buildings of an undetermined function.

During the 1880s, while excavations were conducted by Emile Vouga, the organisation of the site was clarified but the interpretation remained unclear. In 1907, on an initiative of the History and Archaeology society of Neuchâtel with a support from the Canton of Neuchâtel, a well organized excavation started. The excavation, led by William Wavre and then Paul Vouga (1909), consisted in systematically emptying the old river Thielle bed. This methodical excavation lasted until 1917 and brought to light a large corpus of remarkably culturally similar artifacts. Six years later, Vouga published a monograph in the form of a typological inventory of the excavation discoveries where he did not try to suggest an interpretation of the site's function. The publication was considered disappointing, because Vouga did not use techniques that were already known at the time, such as studying the site's stratigraphy. However, Vouga's monograph remains useful for the chronotypological studies of the second Iron Age.

During the following years, the interest for the site declined because of the difficulty of interpretation. However, many hypotheses were proposed: cult site, sacrificial site, theories concerning the large number of bent or broken weapons and the humans and animals skeletons that were found. La Tène remains a particularly difficult site to interpret, mostly due to three major problems:

- The large dispersion of the discoveries: due to the site's notoriety and the amount of looting that occurred, the La Tène's artifacts are scattered around a large number of museums and scientific institutions
- An inequality of the documentation
- A complex topography: the influence of the lake's changing levels and the constructions on the archaeological zone

=== Resumed excavations ===
The Neuchâtel Department of Cultural Heritage and Archaeology (Office du Patrimoine et de l'Archéologie, OPAN) organized a rescue excavation when construction works took place in the nearby camping area. The dig took place through already excavated layers backfilled by Paul Vouga and its aims were to obtain a precise stratigraphy and to date the already known structures.

A new project led by professor Gilbert Kaenel was launched in 2007, with the support of the Swiss National Science Foundation, the University of Neuchâtel and the Neuchâtel Department of Cultural Heritage and Archaeology (Office du Patrimoine et de l'Archéologie, OPAN). The project aimed to establish an inventory of the artifacts and archives concerning the site, to confront them to the results of the 2003 excavation and to stimulate cooperation between the museums in possession of the La Tène discoveries as well as encouraging works about certains categories of artifacts. The project has led to the publications of the La Tène collections from the Musée d'Art et d'Histoire of Geneva, the Bern Historical Museum and the British Museum in London based on a model established by Thierry Lejars for the Schwab museum in Biel/Bienne.

== Discoveries ==
The excavations on the site of La Tène led to the discovery of around 2500 artifacts, including offensive and defensive weapons in iron or wood (swords and scabbard, spears, arrowheads, a bow and shields), tools for industry and agriculture (axes, scythes, knives and a wooden plow), horse harnesses, rings and brochs in iron or bronze, pieces of cloth, a few pots and different Celtic and Roman coinage.

The artifacts discovered in La Tène are now dispersed around the globe, many of which have been illegally sold, which means completing a thorough inventory is extremely hard. Nonetheless, the majority of the objects are kept between the Swiss National Museum in Zürich and the archaeology museum of the Canton of Neuchâtel, the Laténium in Hauterive. Part of Colonel Schwab collection is kept in the Schwab Museum in Biel/Bienne and has been the subject of a thorough monograph.
