= Gilbert Kaenel =

Swiss archaeologist and historian (1949–2020)

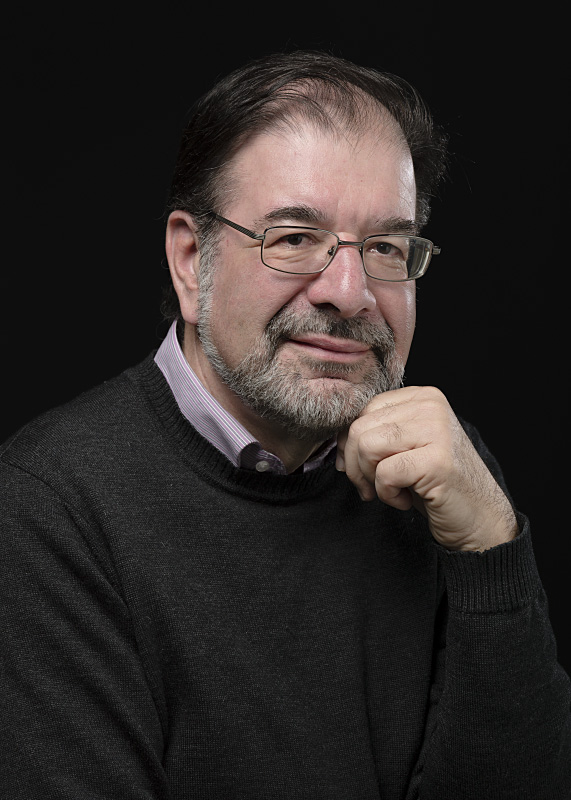
- Born: 17 September 1949
- Died: 20 February 2020 (aged 70)
- Awards: Commander of the Ordre des Arts et des Lettres

Academic background
- Thesis: Recherches sur la période de La Tène en Suisse occidentale

Academic work
- Discipline: history archaeology
- Institutions: Cantonal Museum of Archaeology and History; University of Geneva
- Main interests: La Tène culture

Gilbert Kaenel (17 September 1949 – 20 February 2020), known as "Auguste", was a Swiss archaeologist and historian specialising in the protohistoric and classical periods. He was the director of the Cantonal Museum of Archaeology and History from 1985 to 2014 and a professor at the University of Geneva. Kaenel was known for his research on the La Tène culture in Switzerland, including his excavations at the eponymous site of La Tène.

== Education and career ==
Kaenel's bachelor thesis, published in 1974, was a study of decorated Gallo-Roman pottery from Aventicum. He then turned to protohistoric archaeology, specifically the Iron Age and the La Tène culture in Switzerland. His doctoral thesis, published in 1990, was entitled, Recherches sur la période de La Tène en Suisse occidentale ("Research on the La Tène period in Western Switzerland"). In 2007, he initiated resumed research and excavations at La Tène, a major Iron Age settlement and type site of the La Tène culture, for the first time since 1917. He also led the discovery of a significant new La Tène site at La Mormont.

He joined the University of Geneva as a chargé de cours (lecturer) in 1982 and was appointed a full professor in 2002. He also served as the director of the Cantonal Museum of Archaeology and History 1985 from 2014, during which time he significantly expanded the museum, overhauled the display of its permanent collection, and organised some twenty temporary exhibitions.

Kaenel was appointed a Commander of the Ordre des Arts et des Lettres in 2015. He was a member of the scientific council of the Institut national de recherches archéologiques préventives (Inrap).
