= Dahshur boats =

Group of ancient Egyptian funeral boats discovered near the pyramid of Senusret III

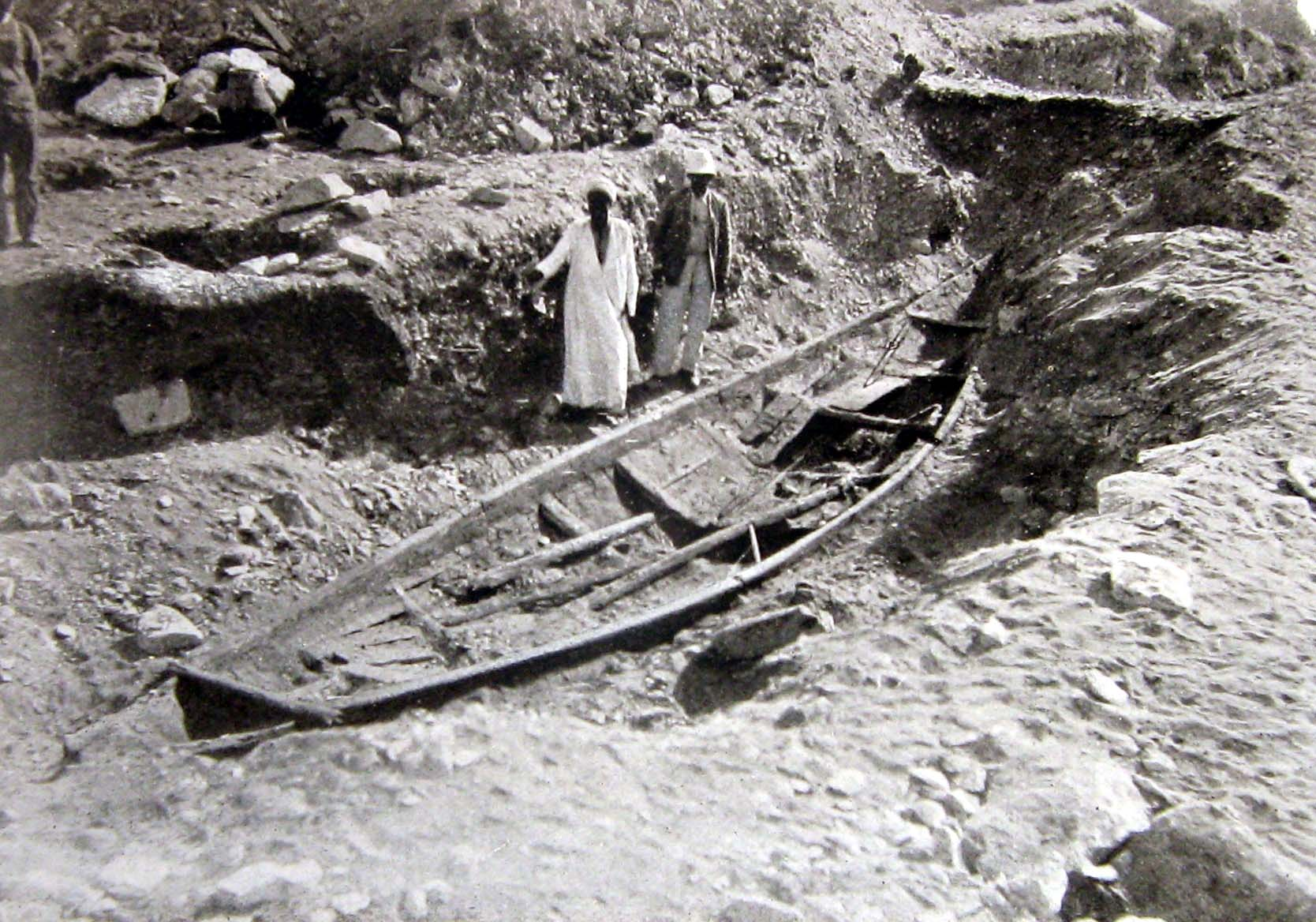
- One of the boats during excavations
- Type: Funeral boats
- Material: Cedar wood
- Length: 10 metres (33 ft)
- Width: 2.3 metres (7.5 ft)
- Created: c. 1870-1831 BC
- Discovered: Dahshur
- Discovered by: Jacques de Morgan
- Culture: Ancient Egypt

The Dahshur boats are a group of ancient Egyptian funeral boats, originally numbering five or six, discovered near the funerary complex of the 12th Dynasty pharaoh Senusret III.

== Excavation ==
The boats were found during excavations on the plain of Dahshur in 1894 and 1895 by French archaeologist Jacques de Morgan. His original excavation report recorded six boats; however, later reports by de Morgan stated there were only five. The boats fell into obscurity until two of the boats were studied in the mid-1980s. As of 2022, the locations of only four of the boats are known; The Carnegie boat and the Chicago boat are in the United States, located in the Carnegie Museum of Natural History in Pittsburgh, and the Field Museum of Natural History in Chicago, respectively. The Red boat and the White boat were on display in the Cairo Museum, but were later relocated to the Sharm El-Sheikh Museum.

== Characteristics ==
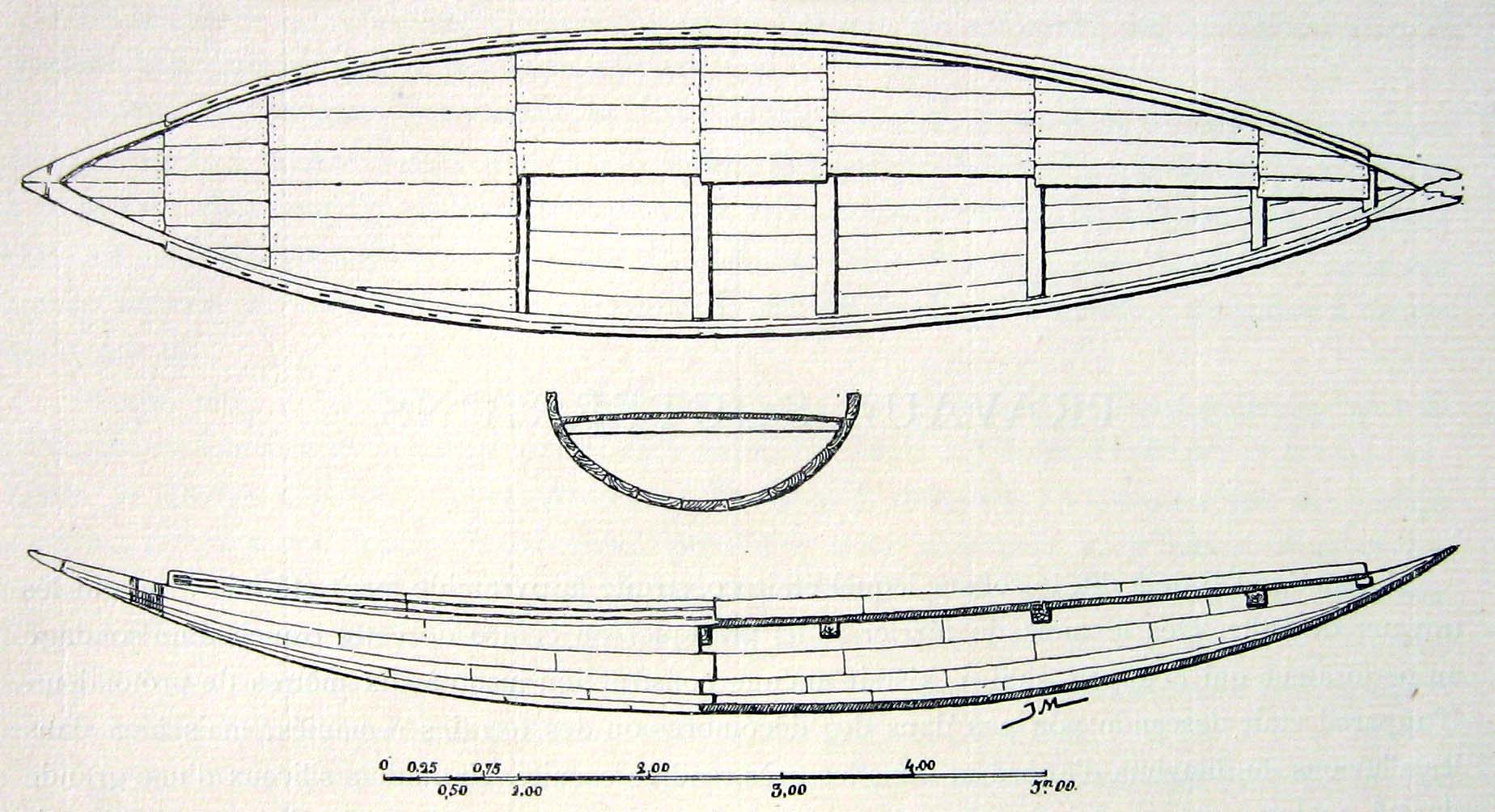
A drawing of one of the boats made by Jacques de Morgan

The boats are each about 10 metres (33 ft) long and are constructed of cedar wood. They were once vibrantly painted, with white decks and either green or yellow hulls.

=== Construction techniques ===
All four of the boats currently exhibit dovetail joints between planks. Dovetail joints are commonly seen in ancient Egyptian furniture, and other wooden objects, such as coffins, but have rarely been observed on watercraft. More commonly, Egyptian boats used a system of rope lashings and mortise and tenon joints, which helped to keep the hull planks from separating under stress. The only places this is visible on the Dahshur boats, are the bow, stern, and the uppermost strake. Dovetail joints were also present on sledges found near the boats. A theory has been proposed stating the dovetail joints found on the boats are instead simply lashing cuts that were modified after the boats excavation. However, in 2006, excavations at the 12th Dynasty port of Wadi Gawasis claim to have uncovered boat timbers that employed dovetail joints in the same way as the Dahshur boats.

=== Function ===
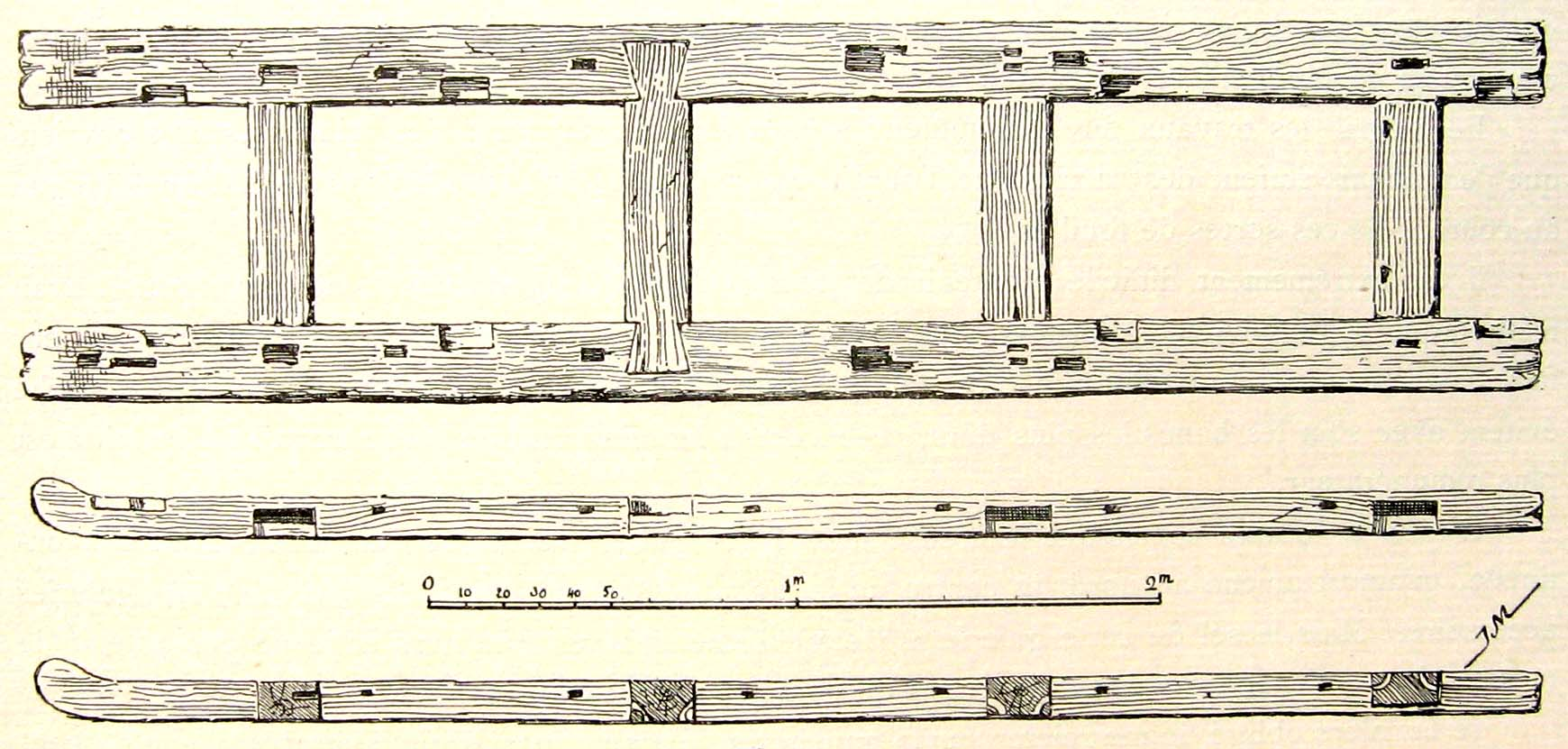
A drawing of one of the sledges made by Jacques de Morgan, showing a dovetail joint

The boats are thought to have been used to carry the body of the Senusret III down the Nile, and were then transported over land to his Pyramid by sledges. These sledges were found buried next to the boats during de Morgan's excavations.

== Carnegie boat ==
The Carnegie boat was donated to the Carnegie Museum of Natural History in 1901 by Andrew Carnegie. When he purchased the boat he did not tell the Museum Director, W.J. Holland. When the boat arrived, Holland told The Pittsburgh Times he “had not been in correspondence with anyone regarding such a relic.” It is undergoing conservation in a visible laboratory at Carnegie Museum of Natural History.

== Chicago boat ==
The Chicago boat was acquired by the Field Museum of Natural History in 1900, and has been on display in the museum since then.

== Red boat and White boat ==
The Red boat and White boat were both given their names by de Morgan. However, they are officially known only by their General Catalogue numbers: GC 4926 for the Red boat and GC 4925 for the White boat. The boats were displayed in the Cairo Museum from 1910 to 2020, when they were relocated to the Sharm El-Sheikh Museum. During their move to the Sharm El-Sheikh Museum, the two boats were transported using a stainless steel chassis for easy movement and lifting.

== Possible fifth boat ==
The fate of the possible fifth boat described by de Morgan is unknown. It has been theorized that it was exported to a museum in Europe, or left in Dahshur. It may also have been destroyed by fire, with evidence of fire damage found on one of the other boats.

== Images of the boats ==
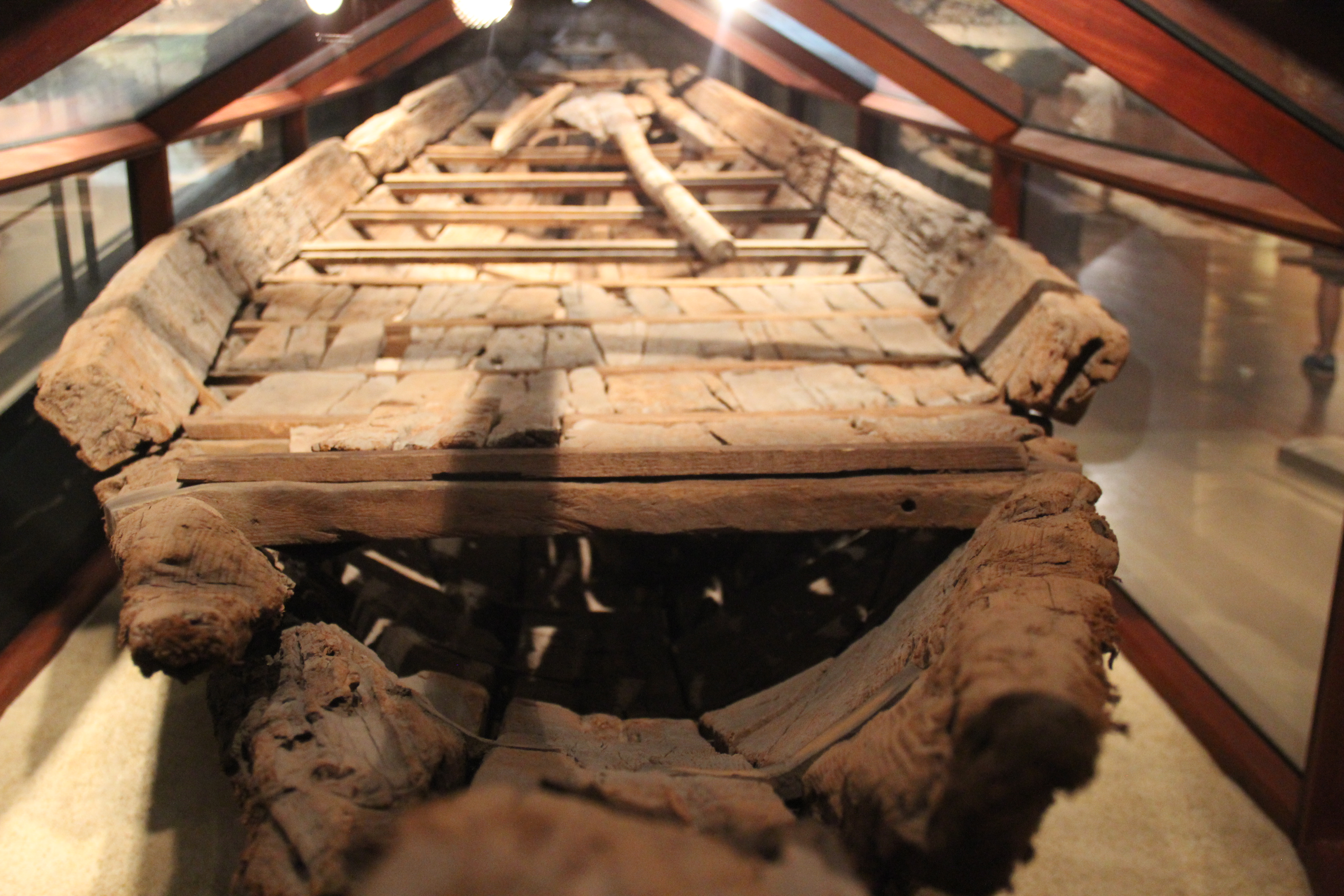
The Chicago boat

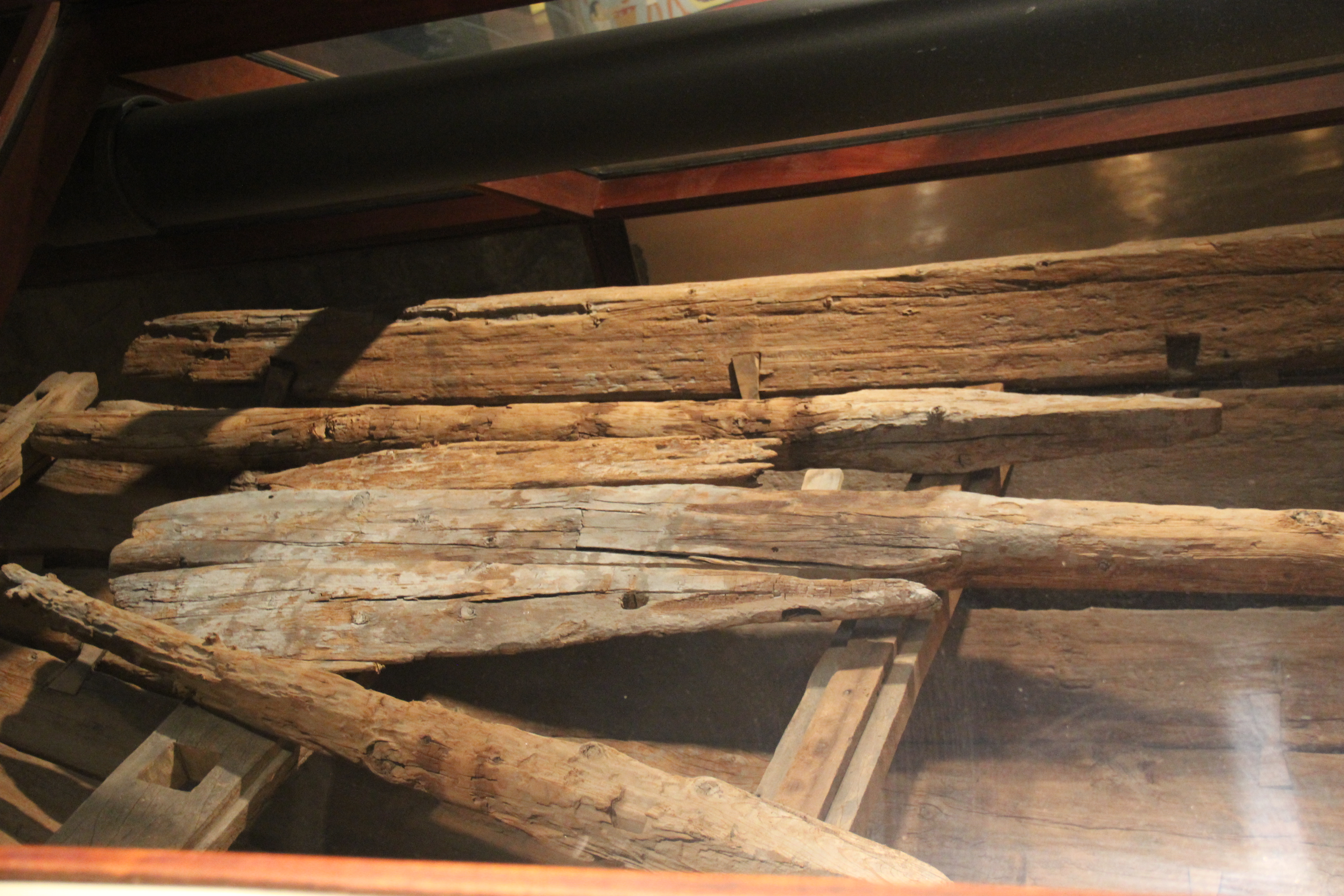
Close-up of the Chicago boat showing an oar

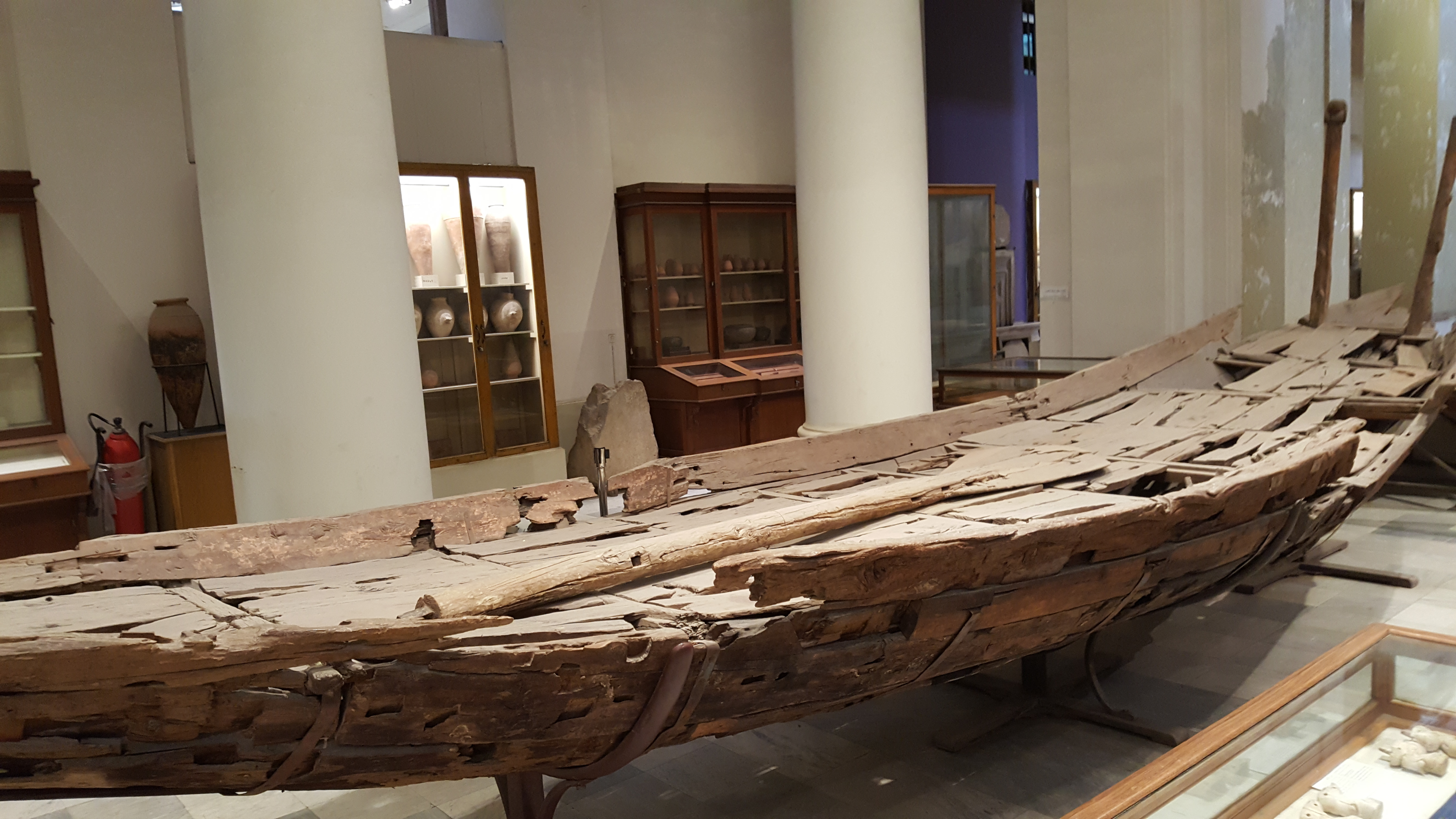
The Red boat

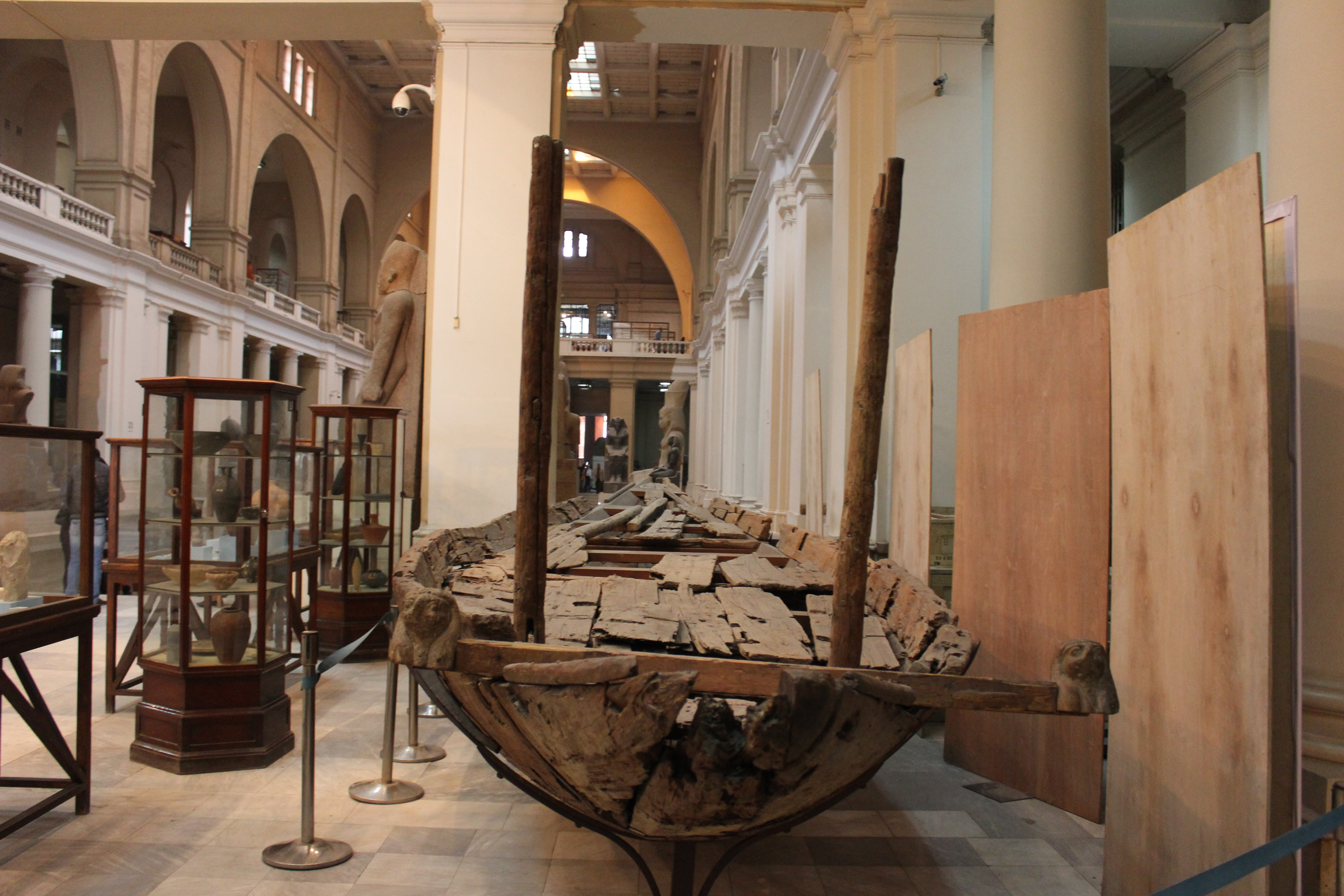
The White boat

== See also ==
- Abydos boats
- Ancient Egyptian technology
- List of surviving ancient ships
- Khufu ship
