= Appleby logboat =

Bronze age logboat

- Material: Wood
- Created: 1500–1300 BC
- Discovered: River Ancholme, North Lincolnshire, England
- Present location: North Lincolnshire Museum, Scunthorpe, England

The Appleby logboat is a Bronze Age logboat, found during dredging of the old River Acholme near Appleby, North Lincolnshire, England in 1943. It dates to the period 1500–1300 BC. It is one of two prehistoric dug-out boat found in the Ancholme, the other being found near Brigg in 1886. Both of these boats contain evidence of repairs in the form of sewing of lashing techniques: splits in the wood had been repaired using birch (Betula sp.) plants held in place by oak (Quercus sp.) wedges.

The boat is on public display at North Lincolnshire Museum.

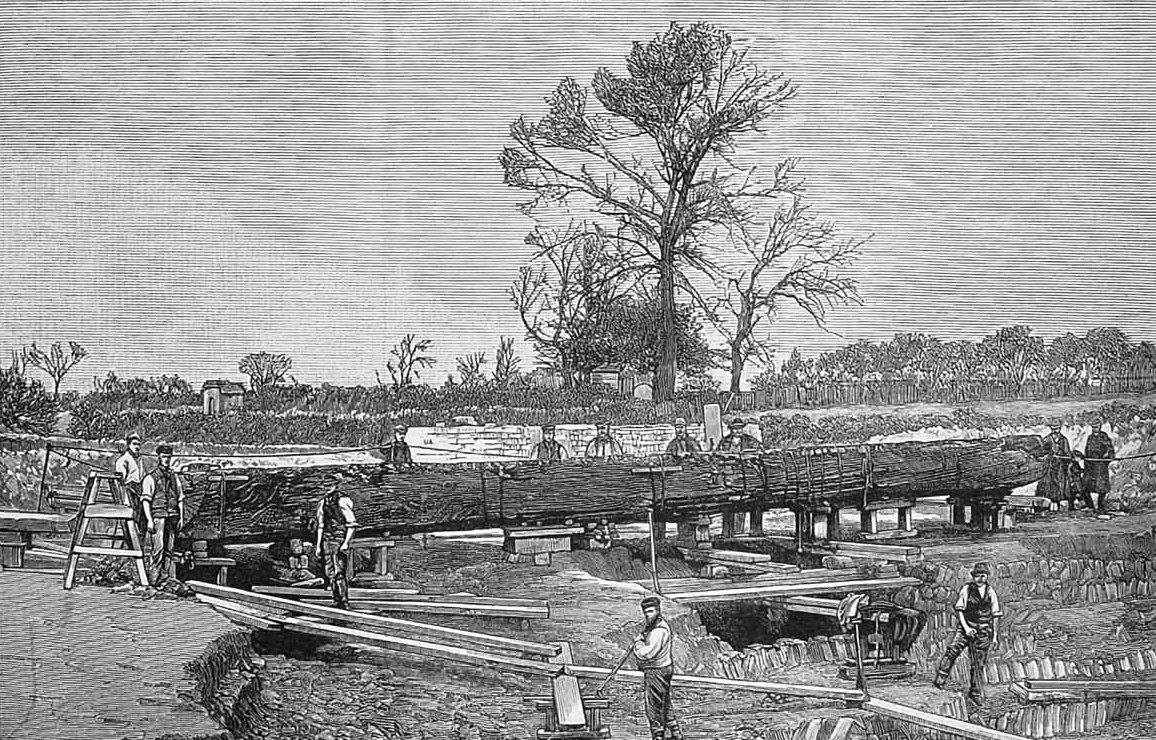
Discovery of a one-tree logboat in Brigg in 1886

== See also ==
- Fiskerton log boat
- List of surviving ancient ships
