= Pirogues de Bercy (Dugouts of Bercy) =

Neolithic canoes discovered in Paris, France

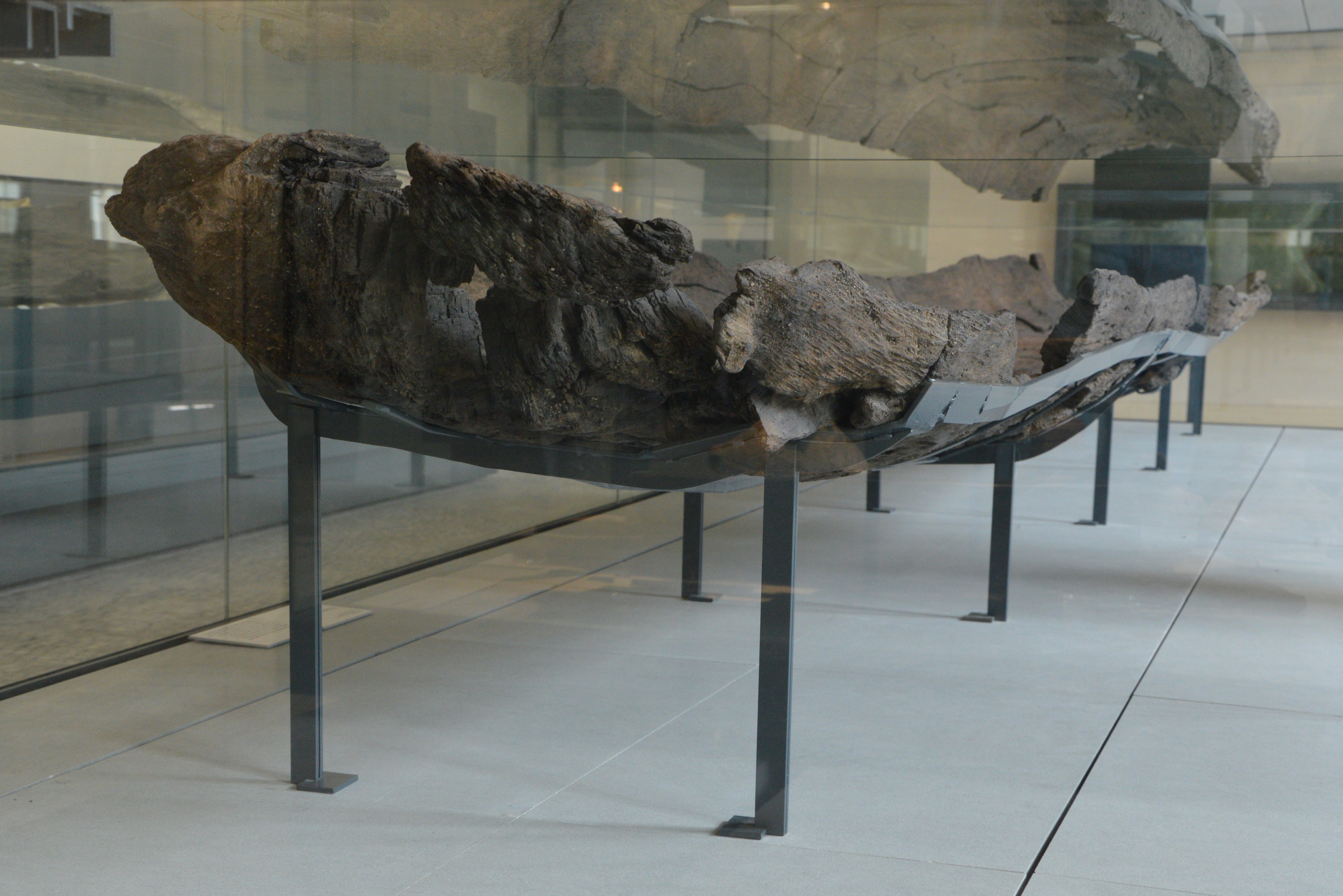
One of the canoes displayed in the Carnavalet Museum

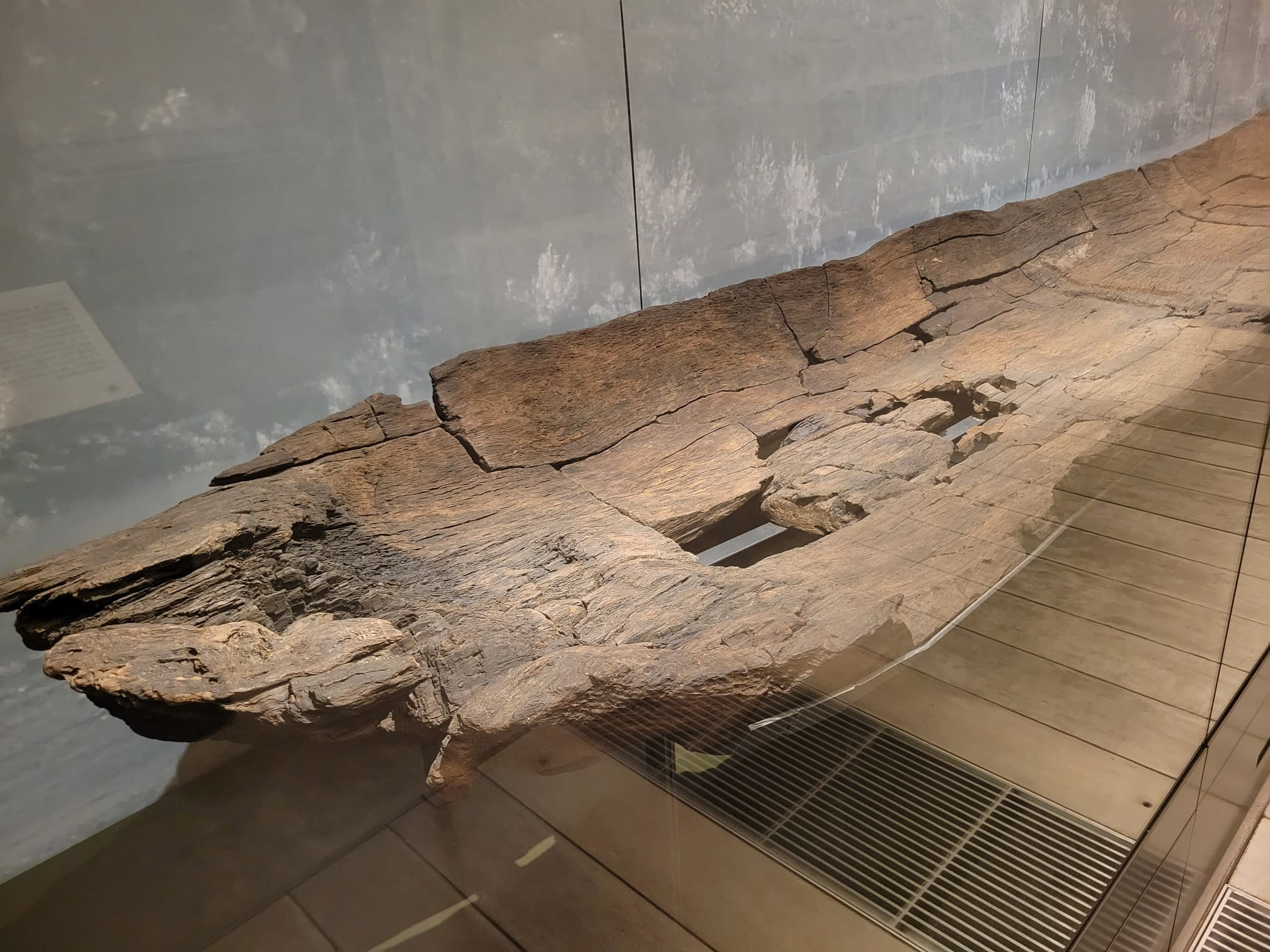
Dugout canoe displayed in the Carnavalet Museum

The Pirogues de Bercy are a group of dugout canoes (or fragments of canoes) dating from the Neolithic period that were discovered in 1989 during construction work in the 12th arrondissement, a neighbourhood located in southeastern Paris. The excavations of 1991–1992 unearthed two lodgings from the middle Neolithic period (about 4500–3400 BC) and one from the Late Neolithic period or the early Bronze Age (about 3000–2600 BC). The dugouts were found at the base of these lodgings, along with other Neolithic artifacts such as pottery, stone and bone tools and arrow heads.

The excavations of successive sediments revealed an almost uninterrupted occupation of the site over the prehistoric period. At the time, the village was located on the left bank of a now-vanished branch of the Seine that split from the main branch a little upstream from the site of the village, then arched to the northwest and later rejoined the main branch farther downstream. At the time, the site in southeastern Paris would have been a wetlands subject to flooding, but would have been centrally located for trade of Neolithic products due to its proximity to the confluence of the Seine and the Marne rivers.

Several of these dugout canoes are now on display at the Carnavalet museum in Paris, along with other artifacts found during the same excavation.

== Description ==
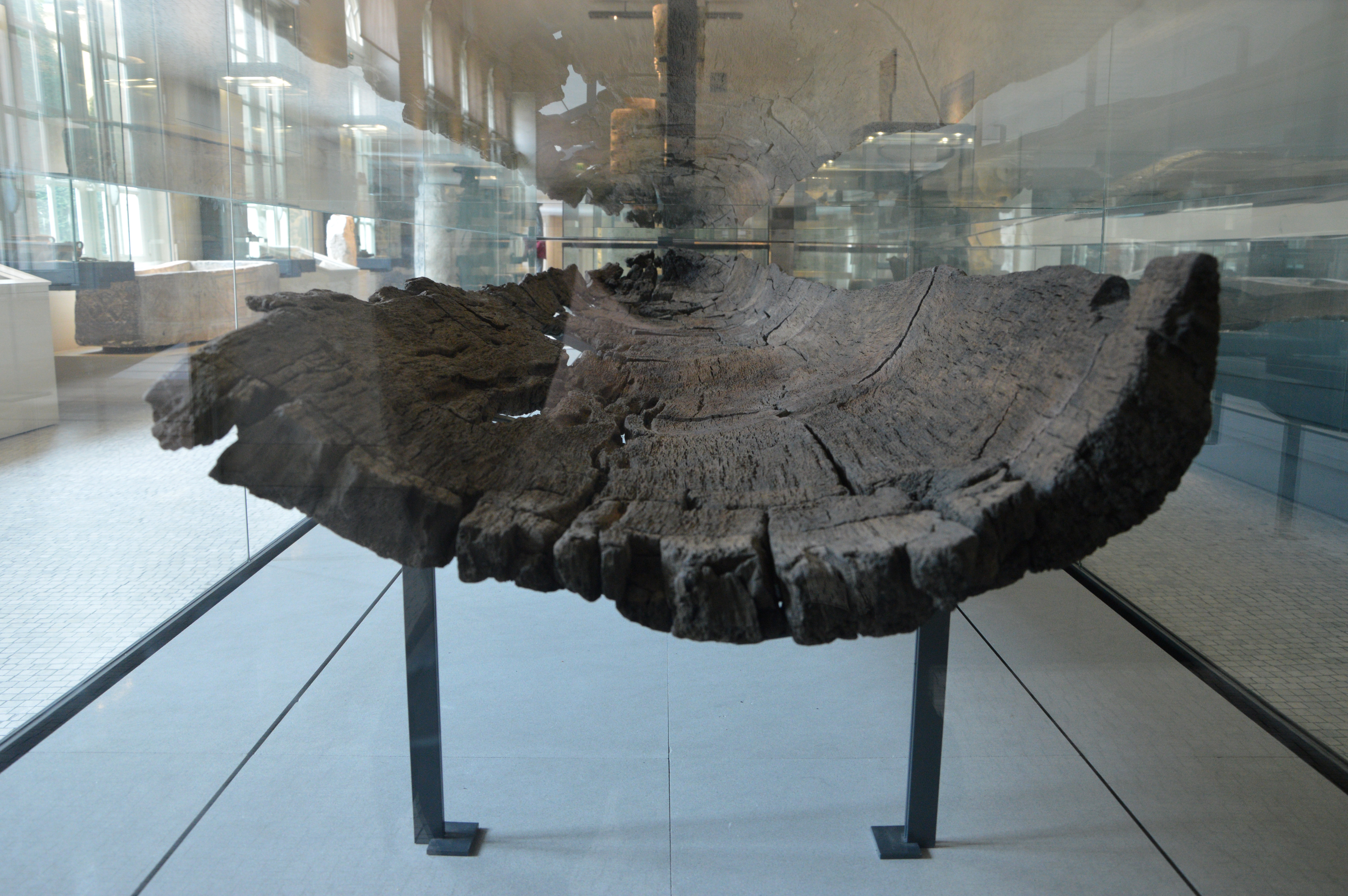
Another view of a dugout

Among the ten dugout canoes (or fragments of dugouts) discovered at Bercy, the two most complete specimens are from the 4800–4300 BC period and from 2700 BC. The extant part of one of the dugouts measures more than 5 meters (16 feet) in length. At the time they were being used, it is likely that the dugouts of Bercy measured between 6 and 8 meters (20 and 26 feet) in length and 80 to 100 centimeters (31 to 39 inches) (or possibly even 120 centimeters (47 inches)) in width.

The dugouts are called monoxyl because they are hollowed out from a single tree trunk (oak, for all 10 dugouts). This was done first by burning the interior and then using various stone tools to remove the burned portions. Since they had no keels, these dugout canoes could not have been very stable, though they were used for fishing and transporting merchandise and people.

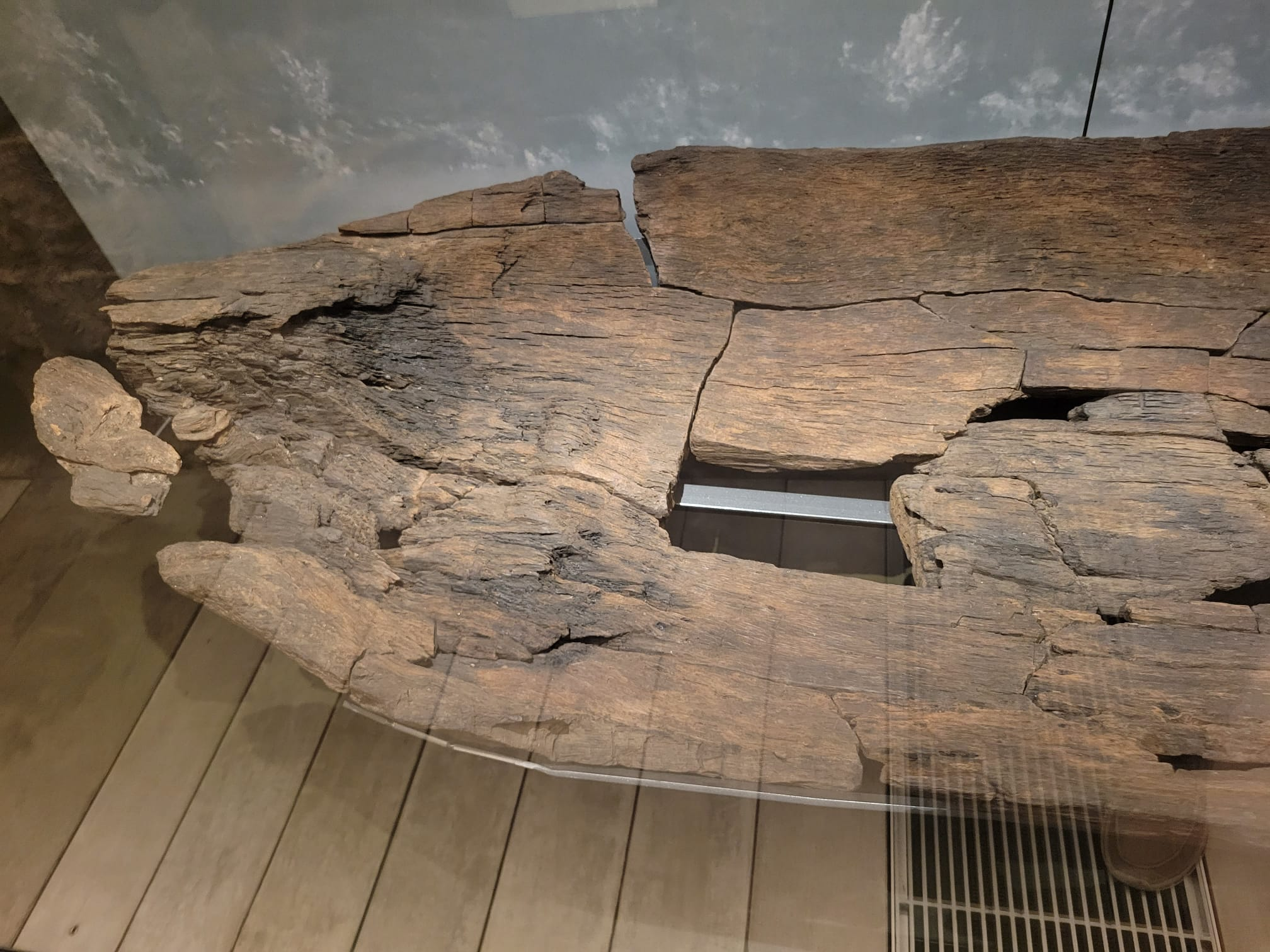
Detail of one of the dugout canoes

The dugouts were found under 15 meters (49 feet) of sedimentary deposits, the weight of which substantially deformed them. From an archaeological point of view, the main interest of these canoes resides in the light they shed on Neolithic construction processes. The tools used to build the dugouts left legible traces that provide information of value to archaeologists. Specifically, three of the ten canoes show traces of carbonisation that are raised relative to the rest of the base of the canoe. One of these, in particular, carries traces of at least two adzes of different widths; the traces were subsequently burned, but not removed. Archaeologists were able to conclude from this that the final stages of canoe construction consisted of a superficial burn (to a depth of about 1 cm) and then the use of an adze to remove the resulting crust of carbonisation.

Another notable characteristic of some of these dugout canoes is their exceptionally thin hulls. For one of them, the base of the hull is only about 1 cm thick. For the builders of such a canoe, it would have been difficult to control the final phases of hollowing out of such a thin hull. Archeologists speculate that the Neolithic builders turned the canoe over and proceeded with the final removal of wood by pounding on the hull, as on a drum. The different sounds at different locations on the hull revealed where additional wood needed to be removed. Such techniques were presumably used to produce canoes that could be more easily transported from one body of water to another.

== Other canoes ==
Although they are the best preserved group of prehistoric dugouts found to date, the canoes of Bercy are not the oldest ever found. Indeed, a number of older dugouts, sometimes made of softer woods such as linden or pine, have been found in Denmark, Switzerland and in other parts of France. The Museum of the Prehistory of the Île de France in Nemours has a canoe in pine that dates from 7500 BC (Mesolithic period). It was found in an ancient branch of the Seine, along with several fish traps.

== See also ==
- List of surviving ancient ships
