= Appleby, Lincolnshire =

Village in Lincolnshire, England

Coordinates: 53.621895°N 0.56629479°W

Appleby
- Location within Lincolnshire
- Population: 588 (2011)
- OS grid reference: SE949148
  - London: 145 mi (233 km) S
- Unitary authority: North Lincolnshire
- Ceremonial county: Lincolnshire
- Region: Yorkshire and the Humber
- Country: England
- Sovereign state: United Kingdom
- Post town: Scunthorpe
- Postcode district: DN15
- Police: Humberside
- Fire: Humberside
- Ambulance: East Midlands
- UK Parliament: Brigg and Immingham

Appleby is a small village and civil parish in North Lincolnshire, England.

The village is situated about 3 miles (5 km) north-east from Scunthorpe, and on the B1207 road. In 1086 it had a recorded population of 26 households, putting it in the largest 40% of settlements recorded in Domesday (NB: 26 households is an estimate, since multiple places are mentioned in the same entry), and is listed under three owners in Domesday Book.

Returns in the 2001 census show an Appleby parish population of 597, reducing slightly to 587 at the 2011 census.

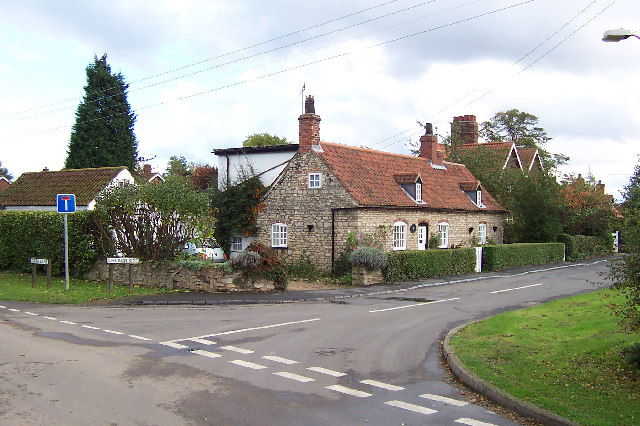
Appleby

The Appleby logboat is a Bronze Age logboat, found during dredging of the old River Acholme near Appleby in 1943.

== Notable people ==
- John Simpson (1933–1993), goalkeeper for Gillingham F.C.
