= Bevaix boat =

1st-century shipwreck in Switzerland

Coordinates: 46.872°N 6.811°E

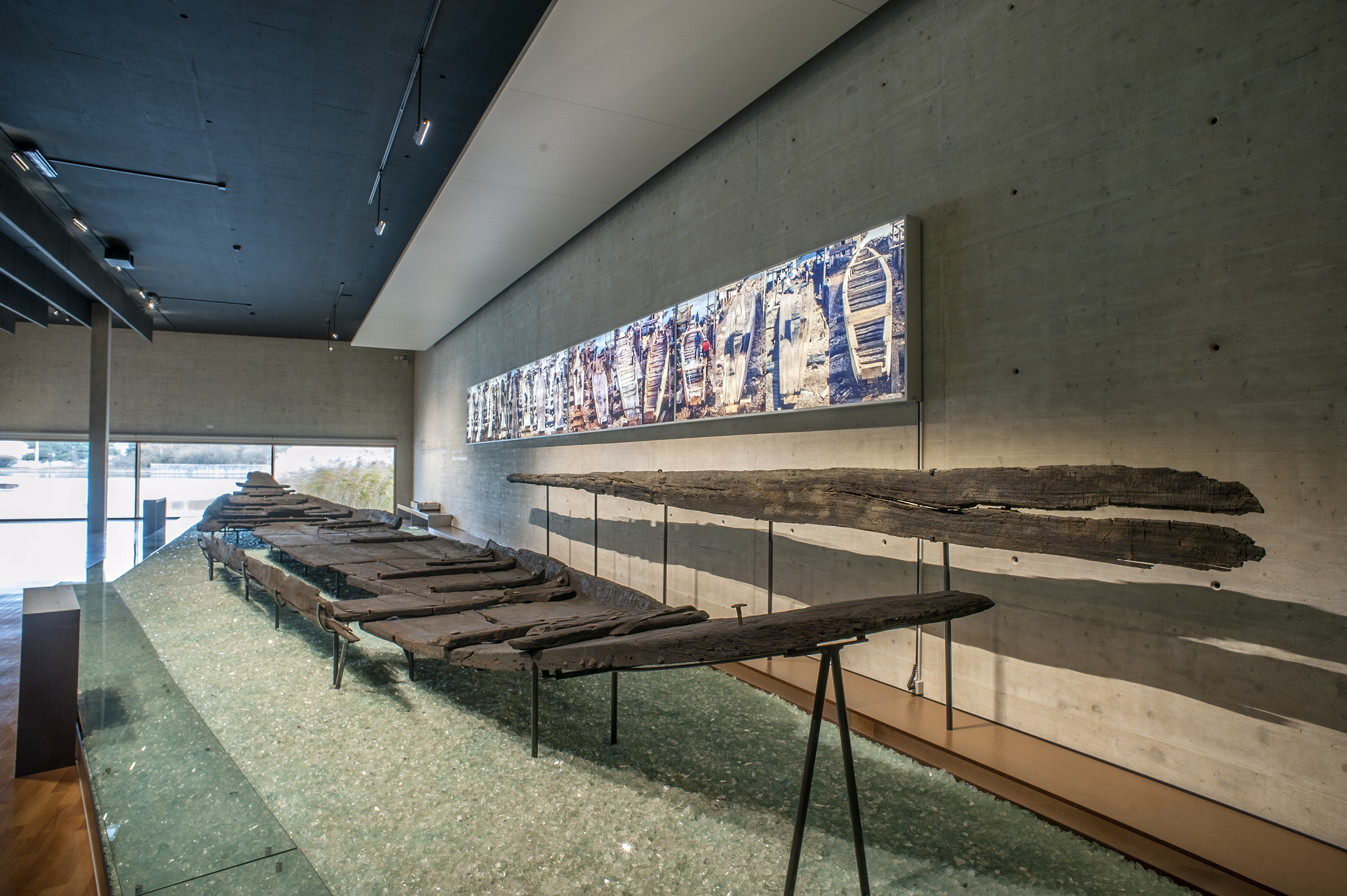
Wreck of the Bevaix Boat

The Bevaix boat is a 1st-century Gallo-Roman wreck from the Bay of Bevaix, Lake Neuchâtel, Switzerland. The remains of the ship, and a modern reconstruction, are on display at the Laténium archeology museum.

== The boat ==
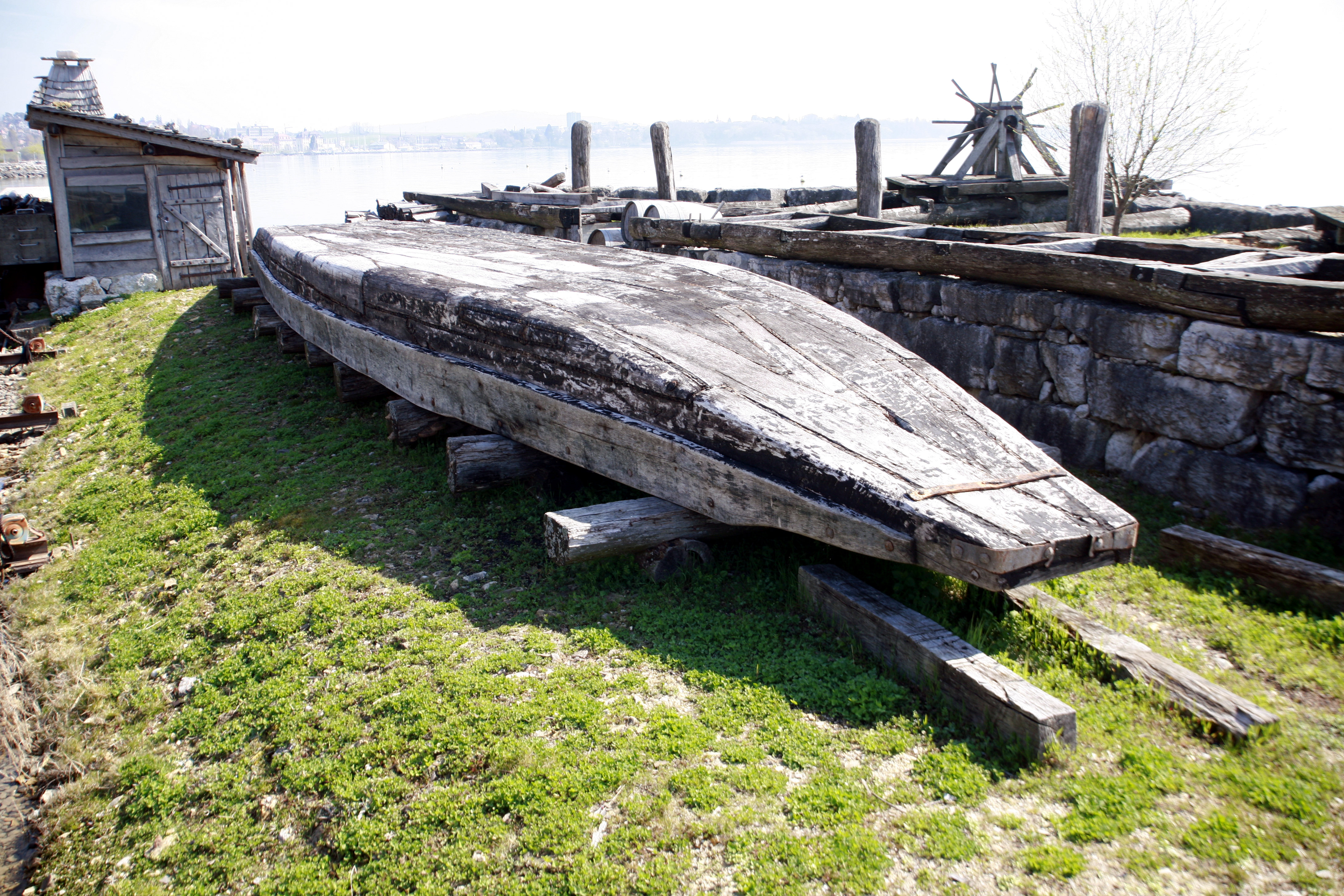
Modern reconstruction

The Bevaix boat was built from large oak planks and measured 19.40 metres (63.6 ft) in length and around 2.90 metres (9.5 ft) in beam. It is characterized by a flat bottom and the complete absence of a keel or any central plank. Its four principle bottom planks were arranged one besides the other in a way that the first plank forms the stern and the last one forms the bow. The beam of the boat was determined by the addition of L-shaped bilge strakes. These strakes allowed a direct transition between the flat bottom and the sides of the boat. The spaces left between the bilge strakes and the four large bottom planks were filled by two planks with an irregular outline. The purpose of these last planks was to obtain appropriate symmetry of the bottom. The upper strakes, those above the bilge strake, did not survive. However, evidence of caulking, found on the upper edges of the bilge strakes clearly suggests that the sides had been heightened by at least one or two strakes. This, in turn, led to estimates suggesting that the maximum height of the boat was about 0.80 to 0.90 metres (2.6 to 3.0 ft).

== Framing ==
Twenty-two pairs of internal frames, also made of oak, were arranged head to tail to give almost vertical sides. All the pairs consisted of two timbers, each made of a single naturally bent timber which was cut from a tree junction (main trunk as floor support, and branch junction as side support). In every case, frames were always installed in pairs covering the whole length of the bottom, but alternatively supporting only one side of the hull. The only exception is a sixth pair, which was a single piece of oak with a mortise cut in the center to function as a mast-step. The framing was fastened to the planks with some 300 iron nails driven from inside. They passed first through the frame, and then the strakes. Any projecting end was clenched at the right angle (double-clenched according to some sources).

== Caulking ==
The Bevaix boat presents a very distinctive caulking technique, which clearly differentiated it from similar finds of this period from other parts of Europe. It was observed that caulking was consistently present between all the planks of the boat. First, a string was inserted into the seam. Next, this string was covered by layer of mosses, which in turn was held by a wooden lath that was secured with thousands of little caulking nails, inserted into the seams from the outside.

== See also ==
- List of surviving ancient ships

== Sources ==
- Arnold, B. 1975. The Gallo-Roman boat from the Bay of Bevaix, Lake Neuchatel, Switzerland, IJNA 4: 123–141
- Arnold, B. 1980. Navigation sur le Lac Neuchatel; une esquisse a travers le temp, Helvetia Archaeologica
- Arnold, B. 1979. Gallo-Roman boat finds in Switzerland, CBA Research Report 24: 31–5
- Gardiner, R. 1996. The Earliest Ships: 66–7
