= Silk Road No.1 =

Silk Road No.1 is a wooden boat from the Han Dynasty (202 BC – 220 AD) which was found at the Weiqiao site in modern Xi'an, China. It is notable as the earliest attestation of the mortise and tenon technique for boat construction in China.

The boat was discovered by a team of archaeologists in December 2014 in a sandy area on the south side of the Weiqiao site in Xi'an and is now displayed in the "Mutual Learning" exhibition hall of the Qin and Han Pavilion of the Shaanxi History Museum.

== Description ==
The wooden boat is broken into two pieces. The surviving portion of the hull consists of 16 planks joined together using the mortise and tenon technique. It now measures 9.71 metres (31 ft 10 in) in length, 1.98 metres (6 ft 6 in) in width, and 0.83 metres (2 ft 9 in) in height. Scientific analysis shows that the wood of the hull is made of chinese juniper, with elm and locust wood used for the bow plate and the tenon plate. The hull was sealed with a caulk made of tung oil.

Carbon-14 dating shows that the ship dates to the Han Dynasty. This makes it the earliest boat made of wooden boards to be found in East Asia. The mortise and tenon technique is not otherwise attested for the construction of river boats in East Asia in this period, where the usual method was to hollow out a single trunk. Peng Wen attributes the adoption of the technique to links with other cultures beyond China.

== Bibliography ==
- 马, 凤霞 (15 Jan 2026). "渭河千年古船：从积沙沉眠到破茧重生". Zhongguo Wenwubao.
- Wang, Ru; Qin, Feng (4 March 2024). "A focus on the formative". China Daily.
