= Laténium =

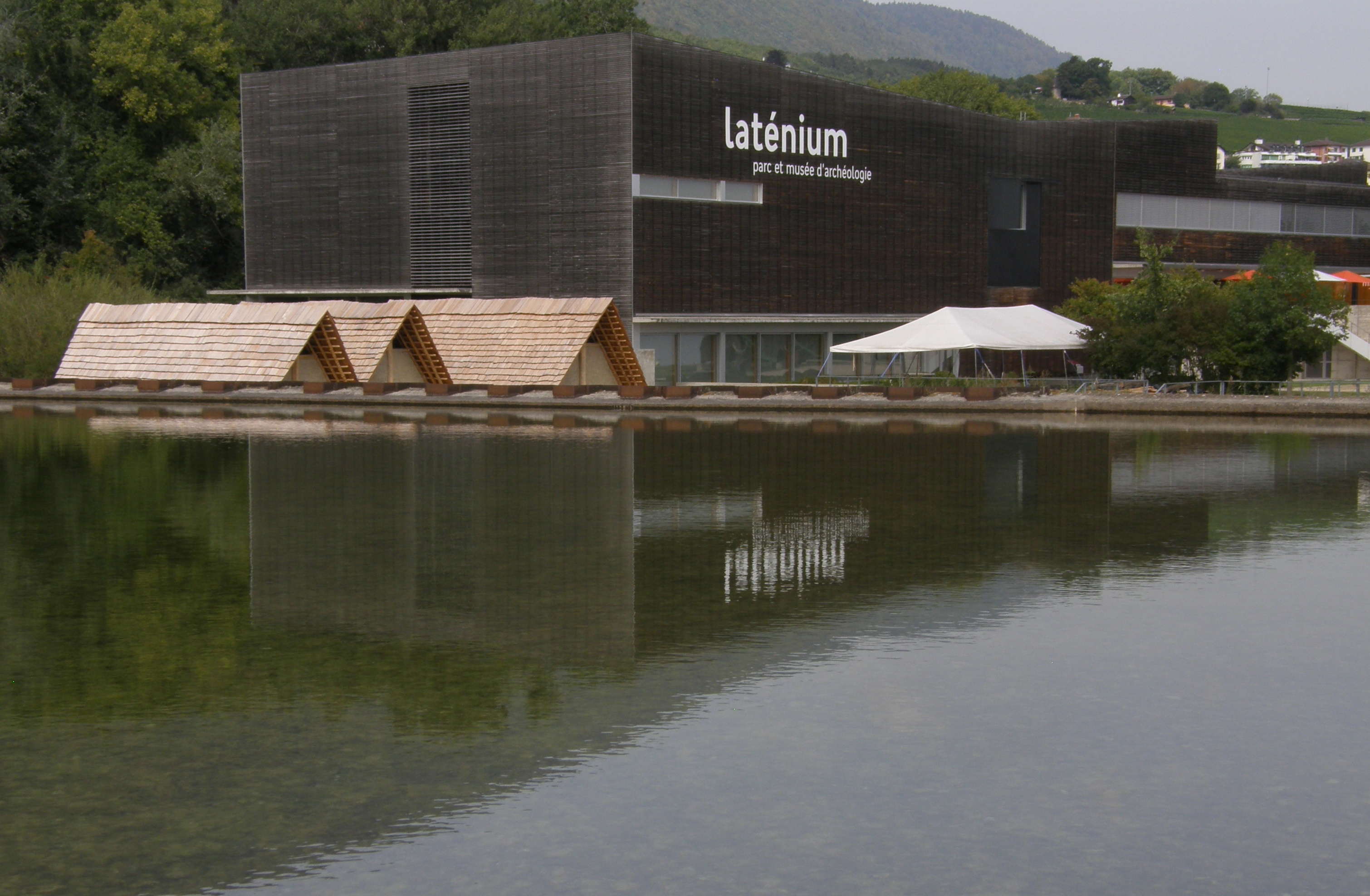
- The Laténium reflecting in the water

- Location within Switzerland
- Established: 7 September 2001
- Location: espace Paul Vouga, CH-2068 Hauterive
- Coordinates: 47°0′26″N 6°58′16″E
- Type: Archaeology museum
- Collections: Archaeology
- Website: www.latenium.ch

The Laténium is an archeology museum located in Laténa, Switzerland. Its name refers to the famous nearby site of La Tène which gave its name to the Second European Iron age. The Laténium is composed of a 2,500 m^{2} (27,000 ft^{2}) park and a museum building which also harbours the archaeological section of the Heritage Offices of the State of Neuchâtel, as well as the chair of prehistory of the University of Neuchâtel. The museum and its park are built on what used to be three archaeological sites that were excavated during the construction of the A5 motorway. Theses sites date from the Upper Paleolithic, Bronze Age and Neolithic. The park features dolmens and glacial erratics, reconstitutions of prehistoric and antique devices (a La Tène house, a Gallo-Roman ship and a Celtic bridge, notably), and modern works of art. The museum displays the Bevaix boat, a 20 m (66 ft) Gallo-Roman ship found in Bevaix. Items from periods comprised between the Paleolithic to the Middle Ages are on display, including the remains of a Magdalenian hunting camp.

== History ==
The Laténium is the biggest archaeological museum in Switzerland. The permanent exhibition features around 3000 objects coming from excavations mostly realised in the Canton of Neuchâtel. These objects are picked from the 525000 pieces that form the museum's collections and span 50'000 years of Europe's past.

=== Archaeology in Neuchâtel during the 19th and 20th century ===
During the second half of the 19th century, many lake dwellings were found on the banks of lakes Neuchâtel, Bienne and Morat during a period dubbed "lake dwellings fever" (fièvre lacustre in french). The Jura waters correction lowered lake Neuchâtel height by 2.7 m which resulted in dozens of lake dwellings sites exiting from the waters. This made access to the artifacts far easier.

Later, the construction of the A5 motorway (from Yverdon-les-Bains to Solothurn) alongside the north bank of Lake Neuchâtel led to the discovery of about 500'000 artifacts, many of them got included into the museum's collections.

=== Creation ===
The concretisation of the idea of a new museum entirely dedicated to archaeology in the canton took 22 years, from the first motion before the Grand Council of Neuchâtel to the inauguration of the museum in 2001. It also took the people of the Canton of Neuchâtel approval, the projects was accepted with 66% of the votes on June 9, 1996.

=== Awards ===
In 2003, the Laténium received the European Museum of the Year Award awarded by the Council of Europe the for its contribution for a better understanding of the european cultural heritage. The Laténium was the first swiss museum to receive the award.

In 2018, it received the Medal for archaeological mediation of the International Union for Prehistoric and Protohistoric Sciences. The Laténium's commitment to the popularisation of archaeology and for the social valorisation of the protection of the cultural heritage got the museum the award.

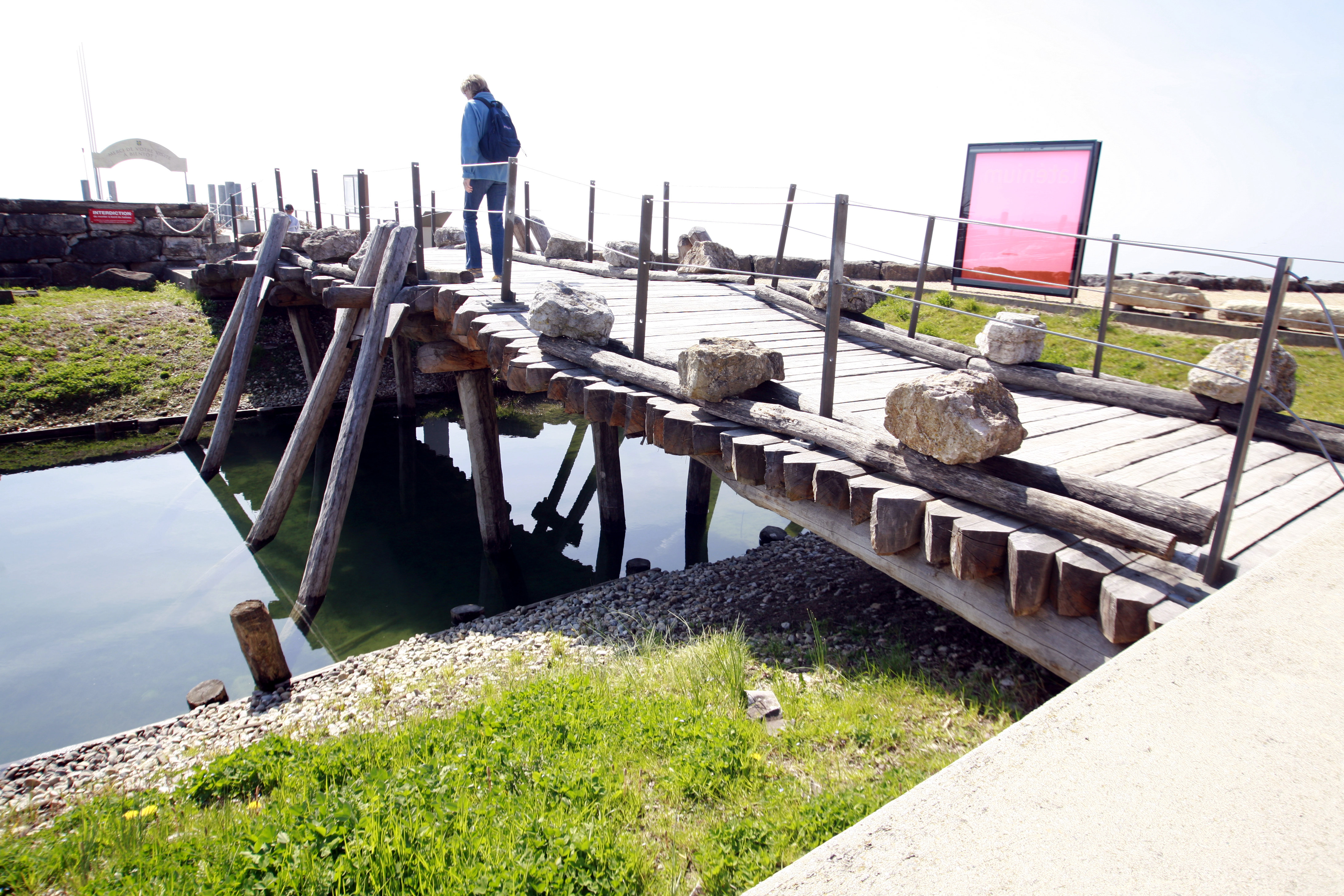
Reconstitution of a Celtic bridge

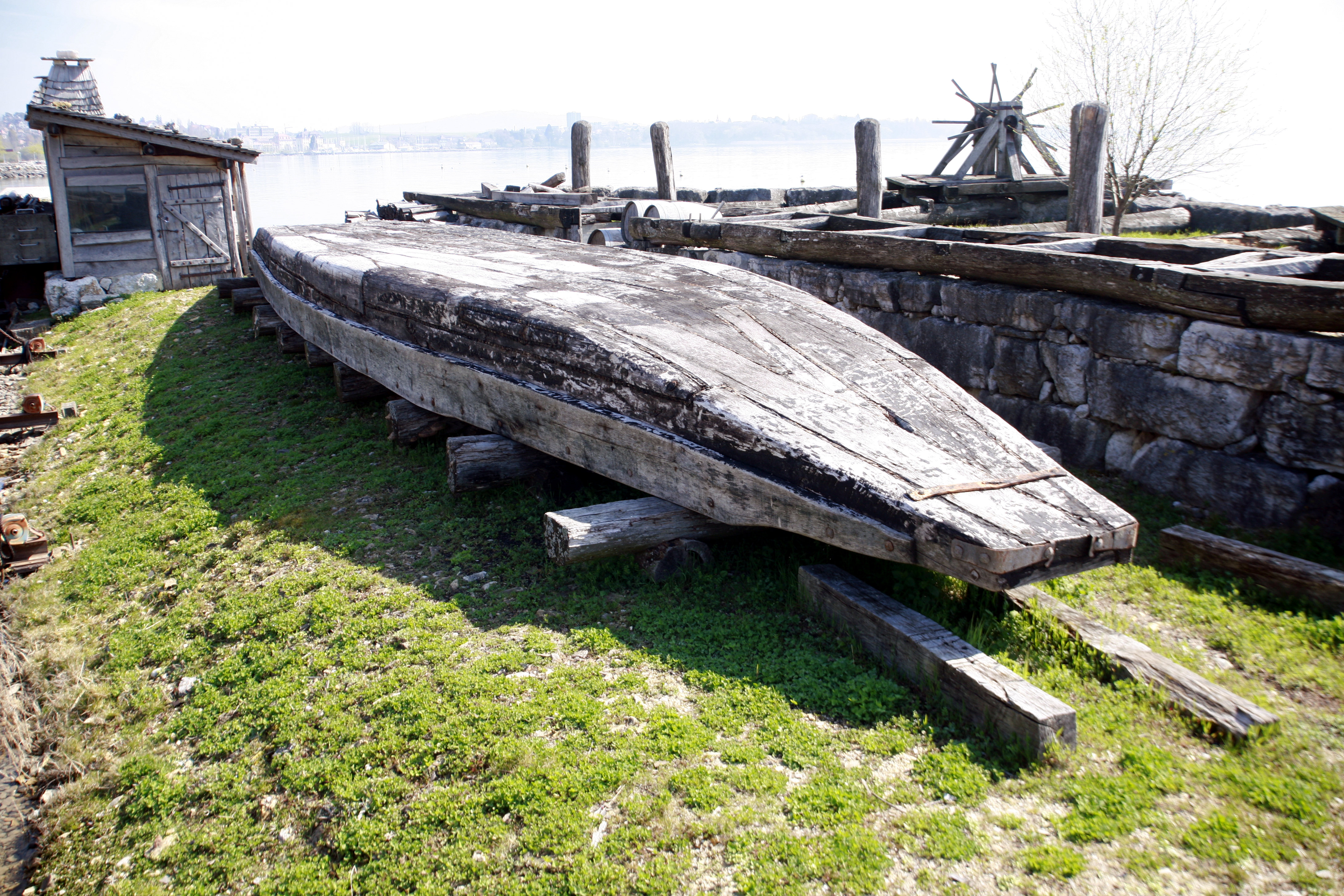
Experimental reconstitution of a Gallo-Roman ship

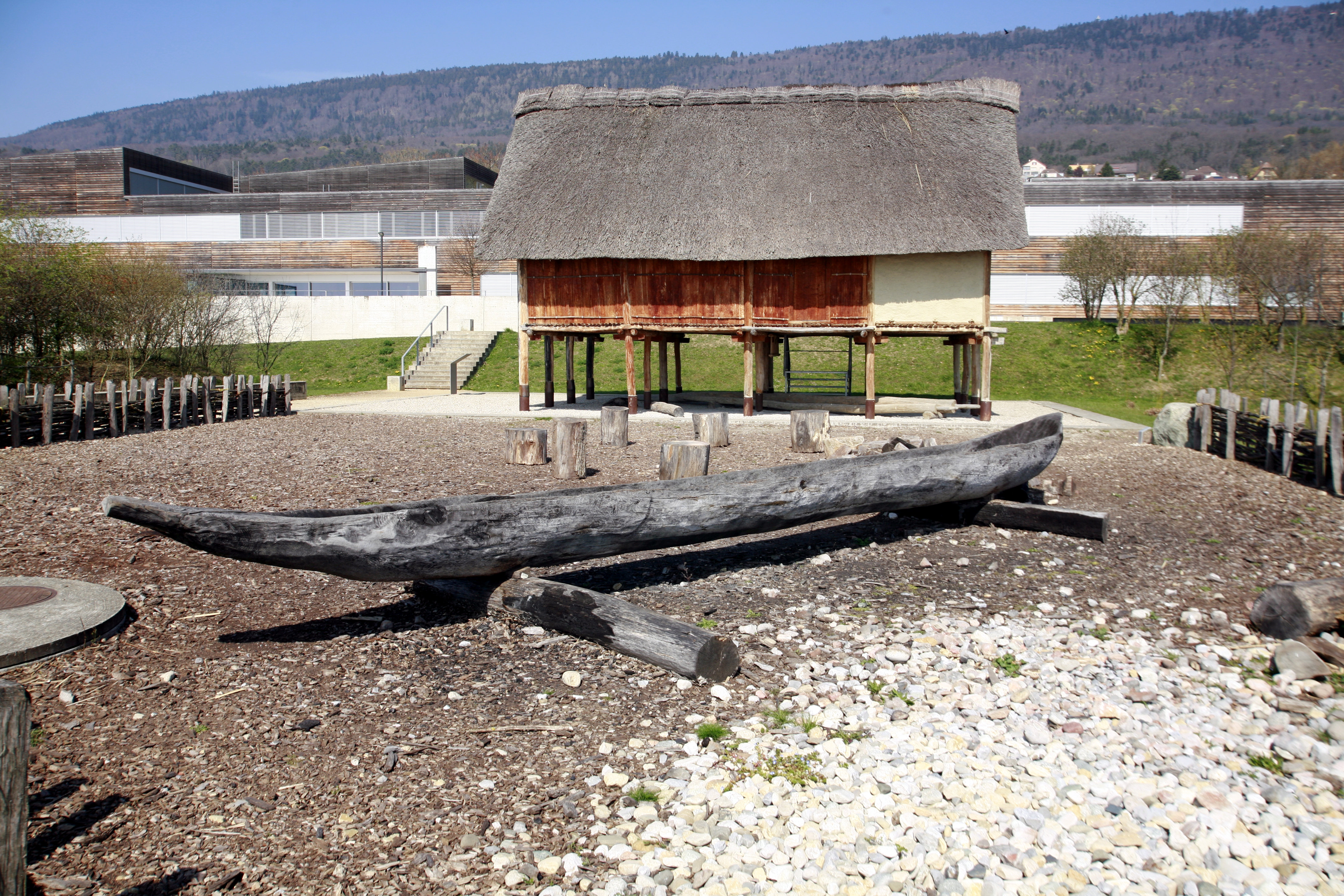
Reconstitution of a fisher's house with pirogue

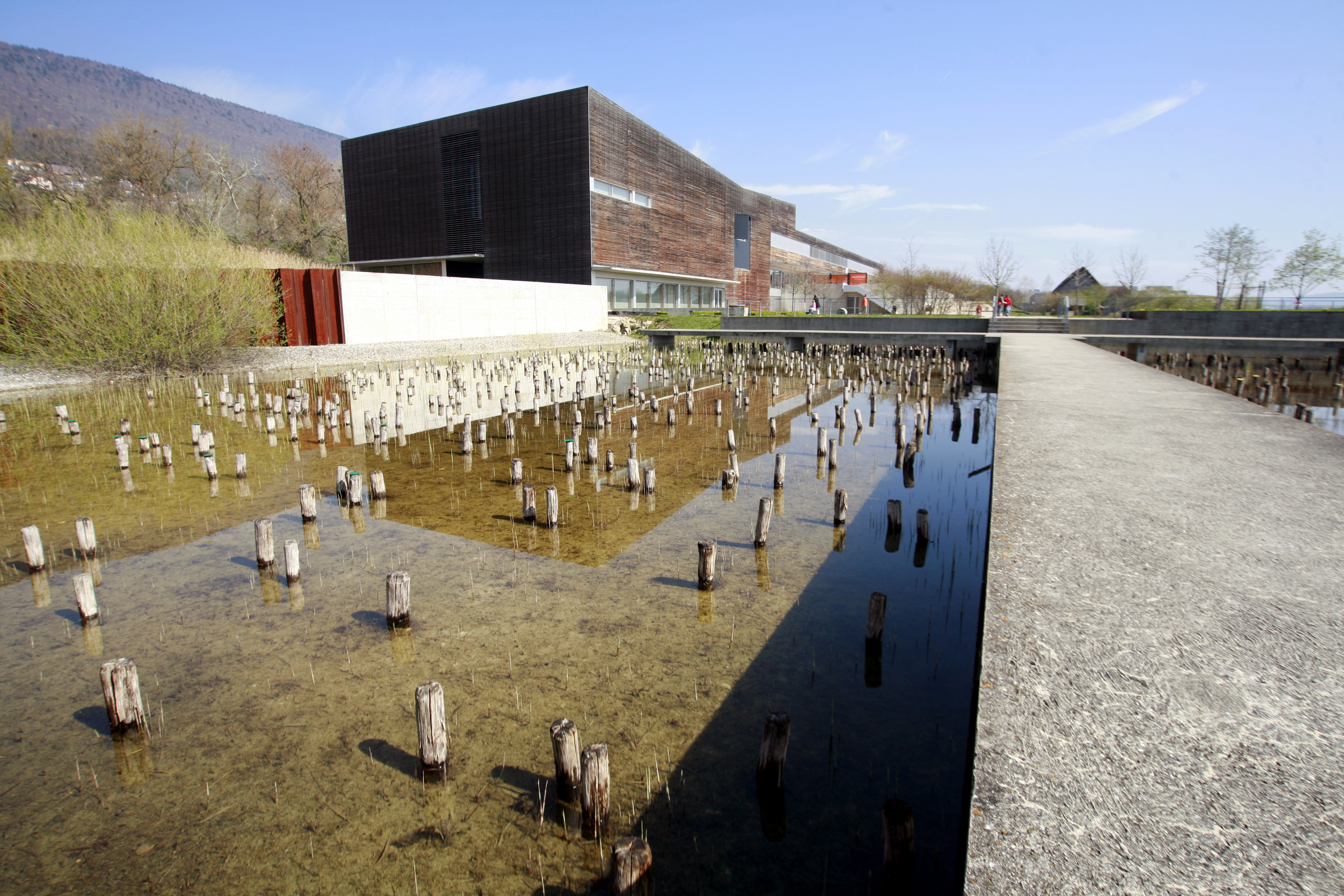
The Laténium building; the bassin of the foreground represents the level of the lake 15 000 years ago, with the pilotis of the Neolithic.

== See also ==
- List of museums in Switzerland
