= Yasser Shamsaldin Mohamad =

Egyptian politician (born 1978)

Yasser Shamsaldin Mohamed is the founder of the April 6 Youth Movement Democratic Front in Alexandria as well as a blogger, journalist, and a prominent participant in the anti-Mubarak demonstrations in Egypt in 2011 (born 1 January 1978 in Cairo)

== Political activism ==
He was a protester with the Egyptian opposition movement Kefaya on April 6, 2008. He joined the April 6 movement front in Alexandria in 2010. He was active during the 2011 Egyptian revolution and its aftermath.

Blogging was one of the means used to bring down the Mubarak regime. Egypt was listed by the Committee to Protect Journalists as one of the ten worst countries to be a blogger in 2009. Aldden was opposed to the Mubarak regime using a blog, established in 2006.

In July 2013, a military coup removed Egyptian President Mohamed Morsi from office. Despite political and ideological disputes between Aldden and the Muslim Brotherhood, he rejected the coup and consequently in 2013 he traveled out of Egypt. He now states that he can't return to the country, and has been placed on airport watchlists. In summer 2011 after differences arose in the April 6 Youth Movement, leaders of the movement announced they would transform it into a NGO or a foundation on its anniversary. On August 8, 2011, Aldden split with a group of 6 April Youth Movement members in Alexandria and established the April 6 Youth Movement Democratic Front, leaving Ahmed Maher's group

== See also ==
Political activists

- Ahmed Maher
- Israa Abdel Fattah
- Malalai Anaa
- Wael Ghonim
- Civil resistance
- Nonviolent resistance
- List of women who sparked a revolution
