= How to Start a Revolution =

- Directed by: Ruaridh Arrow
- Written by: Ruaridh Arrow
- Produced by: Richard Shaw; Cailean Watt, assistant producer James Otis, executive producer
- Starring: Gene Sharp; Jamila Raqib; Colonel Robert "Bob" Helvey; Srđa Popović; Ahmed Maher; Ausama Monajed
- Cinematography: Philip Bloom
- Edited by: Mike Crozier; Lorrin Braddick
- Distributed by: TVF International
- Release date: 18 September 2011
- Running time: 85 minutes
- Country: Scotland
- Language: English

How to Start a Revolution is a BAFTA Scotland Award-winning British documentary film about Nobel Peace Prize nominee and political theorist Gene Sharp, described as the world's foremost scholar on nonviolent revolution. The 2011 film describes Sharp's ideas and their influence on popular uprisings around the world. Screened in cinemas and television in more than 22 countries it became popular among the Occupy Wall Street Movement. A book of the documentary, Gene Sharp: How to Start a Revolution, was released in October 2020.

== Synopsis ==
Directed by British journalist Ruaridh Arrow, the film follows the use of Gene Sharp's work across revolutionary groups throughout the world. There is particular focus on Sharp's key text From Dictatorship to Democracy which has been translated by democracy activists into more than 30 languages and used in revolutions from Serbia and Ukraine to Egypt and Syria. The film describes how Sharp's 198 methods of nonviolent action have inspired and informed uprisings across the globe.

== Cast ==
A primary character of the film is Gene Sharp, founder of the Albert Einstein Institution; and a 2009 and 2012 nominee for the Nobel Peace Prize. Sharp has been a scholar on nonviolent action for more than 50 years, and has been called both the "Machiavelli of nonviolence" and the "Clausewitz of nonviolent warfare." Other main characters include Jamila Raqib, a former refugee who fled Afghanistan and the Executive Director of the Albert Einstein Institution; Colonel Robert "Bob" Helvey; Srđa Popović, leader of the Otpor! students group Serbia; Ahmed Maher, leader of April 6 democracy group Egypt; and Ausama Monajed, a Syrian activist.

== Background and production ==
Scottish journalist Ruaridh Arrow, who wrote, directed and co-produced the film, explained that he first learned about Gene Sharp's work as a student, and then heard that Sharp's booklets were turning up on the sites of many revolutions, while Sharp himself remained largely unknown. In explaining his motivation to make the film, Arrow stated:

Here was this old man [Gene Sharp] sitting in a crumpled house in Boston and that is where revolutionaries go for advice. It was one of the world's great little secrets. It was a little bit of magic and I had to make a film about it.

The film was privately funded by Ruaridh Arrow and additional funding was raised through the US crowdfunding site Kickstarter. The Kickstarter campaign raised $57,342 in just under four weeks making it the most successful British crowdfunded film currently completed. Several high-profile figures are credited by the producers with supporting the crowdfunding project, including director Richard Linklater and actress Miriam Margolyes. Completion funding was donated by US art collector James Otis who in 2009 sold a large collection of Gandhi possessions, including Gandhi's iconic glasses and sandals. Otis stated that he was selling the items to help fund nonviolent struggle projects and is described as the Executive Producer of the film.

Principal photography began in May 2009 with Director of Photography Philip Bloom in Boston. Interview sequences were shot on Sony EX1 cameras with a Letus 35mm lens adapter and the Canon 5dmk2 DSLR camera. Arrow travelled to Egypt to film the Egyptian revolution in February 2011 but his camera equipment was seized by Egyptian secret police on landing and key sequences had to be filmed on an iphone4. Arrow reported live from Tahrir Square for BBC News during this period.

== Release and accolades ==
The premiere was held in Boston on 18 September 2011, the day after the Occupy Wall St protests officially began in New York. The film received a standing ovation and won Best Documentary and the Mass Impact awards at the Boston Film Festival; and went on to be screened at Occupy camps across the US and Europe, including at the Bank of Ideas in London.

The European premiere was held at Raindance Film Festival in London where the film received the award for Best Documentary. Subsequent awards have included Best Documentary Fort Lauderdale International Film Festival 2011, Special Jury Award One World Film Festival Ottawa, Jury Award Bellingham Human Rights Film Festival and Best Film, Barcelona Human Rights Film Festival. In April 2012, BAFTA Scotland announced that Arrow and the film had won its New Talent Award in the Factual (longer than 30 minutes) category; and the film was shortlisted for a Grierson Award in July 2012.

How to Start a Revolution was picked up for distribution by TVF International in the UK and 7th Art Releasing in the US. The film has reportedly been translated into nine languages, including Japanese and Russian. The Albert Einstein Institute has reported that the film has been shown internationally on several television stations.

== Reception ==
The film has received a positive critical reception. It received four stars in Time Out London, "a reminder of the importance of intellectual thought to the everyday". The Huffington Post said it was a "vital conversation starter and educational tool in a world awash with violence" and in the UK The Daily Telegraph described it as a "World conquering Documentary". The New York Times called it a "noble documentary" but criticised the absence of historical context of nonviolent struggles pre-dating Sharp. Variety described the film as "straightforward", "informative", and "with potential to be updated as world events unfold", stating it "should have a long shelf life". Negative references have been made to the use of dramatic music during certain sequences.

== Influence ==
How to Start a Revolution was released on 18 September 2011, the day after the first Occupy protests in Wall St, New York. The film was described as the unofficial film of the Occupy movement and shown in camps across the US and Europe. It was one of a number of high-profile events held in London's Bank of Ideas along with a concert by British band Radiohead.

In 2012, following the Mexican general election one of the country's largest newspapers reported that protestors were circulating a pirated Spanish translation of How to Start a Revolution which had gone viral in the country. The translation was viewed over half a million times in the space of three days. Reports have also been published citing the airing of the film on Spanish television concurrent with widespread discussion of Sharp's work in the Spanish anti-austerity 15-M Movement.

The academic premiere was hosted by the Program on Negotiation at Harvard Law School on 11 October 2011, and In February 2012, How to Start a Revolution was screened to an audience of MPs and Lords in the UK Houses of Parliament by the All Party Parliamentary Group on Conflict Issues, which was attended by Sharp and Arrow.

A film about the making of How to Start a Revolution, entitled Road to Revolution, was screened in January 2012 by Current TV in the UK.

On January 22, 2017, after the inauguration of President Donald Trump, the PBS America channel screened How to Start a Revolution immediately after a Frontline investigation into his election.

== Touch Documentary ==
In 2012 How to Start a Revolution was among the first "Touch Documentaries" to be released using the Apple iPad platform. The film was integrated into the platform along with several of Sharp's lectures and four of Gene Sharp's books in several languages, including From Dictatorship to Democracy. The app is supplemented by analysis and satellite mapping which is offered up to the viewer while watching the film. A "Revolution Monitor" is also included, which fuses Google Earth maps with Twitter displaying tweets and YouTube links from revolutionary groups and individuals when countries of interest are touched by the viewer. A review by Peace and Collaborative Development Network described the app as "simply a must-have among peace studies scholars, those actively working to start or reorganize revolutions, or anyone who is interested in the logistics, history, and outcomes of nonviolent revolutions". The How to Start a Revolution touch documentary was shortlisted for the International Best Digital Media award in the One World Media Awards 2013.
