= Hamdeen Sabahi =

Egyptian journalist and politician

- حمدين صباحى
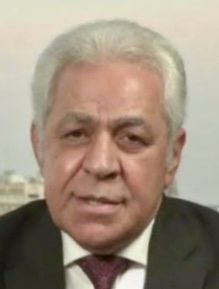
- Sabahi in December 2012

Member of the Parliament of Egypt
- In office 2000–2010

Personal details
- Born: Hamdeen Abdel-Atty Abdel-Maksoud Sabahi; 5 July 1954 (age 72) Baltim, Kafr el-Sheikh Governorate, Republic of Egypt
- Party: Egyptian Popular Current
- Other political affiliations: Dignity Party
- Spouse: Seham Negm
- Children: Salma Sabahi; Ahmed Sabahi
- Education: Cairo University
- Known for: politician, journalist

Hamdeen Sabahi (Arabic: حمدين صباحي, romanized: Ḥamdīn Ṣabāḥī, IPA: [ħæmˈdeːn sˤɑˈbɑːħi]; born 5 July 1954) is an Egyptian politician and journalist. He is a former presidential candidate and currently the leader of the Egyptian Popular Current and a co-leader of the National Salvation Front.

An opposition activist during the Anwar Sadat and Hosni Mubarak eras, Sabahi was jailed 17 times during their presidencies for political dissidence. He was an immediate supporter and participant of the 2011 Egyptian revolution. Sabahi entered the 2012 Egyptian presidential race in which he finished third place with 21.5% of the vote trailing the second place candidate Ahmed Shafiq by a margin of 700,000 votes.

In the 2014 presidential election he was one of just two candidates. He ran second with less than 4% of the vote. Abdel Fattah el-Sisi was declared the winner after attracting 22 million of the nearly 23 million votes cast.

A well-known opposition figure, Sabahi ascribes to Nasserism and in 1996 he founded the Nasserist Karama (Dignity) Party. Sabahi ran as an independent and not as the Dignity Party's candidate. One of the few secular figures without any ties to the regime of Hosni Mubarak, Sabahi attracted the support of several leading Nasserists. Sabahi ran under the slogan "one of us" which highlights his strong ties with the working class and advocates his socialist aspirations. Sabahi also gained the support of prominent Egyptian figures including writer and political activist Alaa Al Aswany and director and film-writer Khaled Youssef.

== Early life ==
Sabahi was born in a small Nile Delta town in Kafr el-Sheikh Governorate called Baltim in 1954 to a father who was a fellah ("peasant"). Of his eleven siblings, Sabahi was the youngest. His father had benefited from the land ownership reforms brought about after the Egyptian Revolution of 1952. Sabahi spent his childhood being around farmers and fishermen and became a fisherman during adolescence.

== Education ==
In 1975 Sabahi became a student in Cairo University where he studied mass communication and served as editor-in-chief of the university's magazine The Students. Together with a group of his friends, Sabahi founded the Nasserist Thought Club, which he also presided over. The club soon after opened branches in other Egyptian universities. Sabahi and his colleagues established the club in response to what they saw as Sadat's policy of undoing late President Gamal Abdel Nasser's legacy. That year, Sabahi was also elected as president of Cairo University's student council until 1976 and as the president of the General Union of Egyptian Students until 1977.

In 1977, after the mass anti-government protests, then-President Anwar Sadat met with Student Union representatives from around Egypt for a televised debate and it was there that Sabahi became well known among Egyptians. He openly expressed his disapproval of Sadat's economic policies and the alleged corruption of his government. He criticized Sadat's Infitah or "Open-Door" policy, which he said only favored the capitalists and those who were already well-off. He also criticized Sadat's plans to make peace with Israel, while Palestinians remained without a home and devoid of representation. "If the terms we have to accept in order for this land to be returned include recognizing the Zionist entity," Sabahi argued, "this would be a mistake." Because of this confrontation, Sabahi was banned from working as a journalist in the state-controlled media.

In September 1981, as a result of his vociferous criticism of the peace treaty, Sabahi became the youngest member of the Nationalist Opposition movement to be detained. He was among some 1,500 other political activists jailed by Sadat's government in nationwide crackdown. In 1985 he obtained his master's in journalism. Shortly thereafter, Sabahi and some colleagues founded Saʿid (The Rising), "a center for Arabic journalism", where many young, Arab journalists were trained in the field. Sabahi was arrested again, this time during the presidency of Hosni Mubarak in the late 1980s, for allegedly being a member of the "Egypt Revolution" group, which was accused of killing Israelis inside Egypt. The group, led by Mahmoud Nour Eddin, included Khalid Abdel Nasser, the son of late President Nasser. He was arrested again in 1991 after a speech to students in Cairo University where he condemned airstrikes by the United States against Iraq, following the Iraqi military's withdrawal from Kuwait.

== Political career ==
=== Membership in the Nasserist Party ===
Sabahi helped establish the Arab Democratic Nasserist Party (legalized in 1992), headed by Diaa al-Din Dawoud. In 1993 he was among the members of the Egyptian nationalist movement to visit Palestinian resistance leaders in Lebanon. He had been consistently supportive of Palestinian and Lebanese resistance to Israel since the 1970s. In the same year, Sabahi survived an assassination attempt and was later detained for speaking against Arabs' inaction to the sanctions imposed on Iraq. In his first attempt at running for parliamentary elections in 1995, Mubarak government allegedly sent out thugs to attack his supporters in what was relatively common practice by the ruling government during that period. He did not win in that election, although he won a significant number of votes and made it to the run-off.

Following the 1995 parliamentary elections in Egypt, tensions developed between the party's old and new guards. The old guard was represented by Dawoud and included former members of the Arab Socialist Union (ASU) who were imprisoned by then-President Anwar Sadat in 1971, while the young guard consisted of student activists who advocated the principles Nasserism throughout Sadat's rule. Sabahi was part of the latter group and along with Amin Iskander and three other high-ranking cadres from the young guard, were eventually suspended from the party by Dawoud in March 1996 for continually insisting that the old guard share power with the youth for the sake of modernization. They were subsequently banned from the 1996 internal elections, which Sabahi dismissed as neither free nor fair.

In 1997 the Mubarak regime passed a law that stripped farmers of their right to own the land that they paid for and maintained, effectively bringing an end to the reforms of the Nasser era and undermining the tenancy rights of farmers. Sabahi was arrested for the third time and tortured in 1997 for vociferously opposing the law. He was charged "with inciting agricultural workers to stage an open-ended sit-in on their land in protest" against that law.

=== Leader of al-Karama ===
In 1998 Sabahi and Iskander founded the al-Karama ("Dignity") political party after resigning from the ADNP. In September their suspension from the party was annulled as illegal, but they refused to return to the ADNP with Sabahi stating "Our differences with Dawoud arise from his insistence on taking unilateral decisions, regardless of the opinion of the majority of party members." Al-Karama was refused legalization by the government-supervised Political Parties Committee. Starting 1999, Sabahi became an active member of the Journalists Syndicate and was appointed as head of its Media committee. In 2000 Sabahi was elected as a member of parliament, although he ran as an independent. His campaign at the time focused preserving Lake Burullus and protecting it from pollution. He also opposed land enlargement schemes in the lake area by filling Burullus up with sand, which he claimed would destroy the area's fauna and lead to high unemployment among fishermen.

In 2003 Sabahi was arrested for the fourth time for leading demonstrations against the usage of the Suez Canal by United States' destroyers heading towards Iraq as part of the invasion of that country. He was the first member of parliament to be detained while in office. A year later, he helped establish the grassroots coalition "Egyptian Movement for Change" or Kefaya (Enough), which opposed the prolonging of Mubarak's rule and the idea of grooming Mubarak's son, Gamal, for the presidency.

Sabahi became the editor-in-chief of the newly created Al-Karama newspaper, the official paper of the party, until mid 2010. In 2006 Sabahi declared his support for the Lebanese resistance to Israel, and in 2008, he went to the Gaza Strip in an attempt to help lift the siege of the territory. While he was there, Sabahi met with Palestinian officials from the Hamas movement to discuss the conditions in the Strip and express the solidarity of the Egyptian people with the Palestinian cause and Hamas' stance against Israel. In 2009, Sabahi left his position as secretary-general of al-Karama to focus on his plan to run for the upcoming presidential election. Initially, in 2010, he was able to garner the support of thousands for his campaign-to-be. In early 2010, he co-founded Al-Gamʿiyya al-Wataniyya lil-Taghyir or the "National Association for Change" of which Mohammed ElBaradei and Ayman Nour were also co-founders.

=== Role in the Egyptian Revolution ===
On 25 January 2011, the first day of the Egyptian Revolution of 2011, Sabahi joined the protests that took place in his hometown of Baltim, and was lightly injured by security forces attempting to quell the demonstration. Afterwards he participated in the mass anti-Mubarak demonstrations in Cairo's Tahrir Square. He took part in the "Friday of Anger" protest on 28 January, where he spent the entire day in Mohandessin area of Cairo among the masses.

After the fall the Mubarak's government, Sabahi has given several speeches and lectures at universities supporting the revolution and addressing its aftermath. He participated in several protests the Supreme Council of the Armed Forces which maintained interim control of the country. In August 2011 he took part in demonstrations outside the Israeli embassy in Cairo. He criticized SCAF's handling of protests, particularly the Maspero demonstrations where 26 protesters were killed and Mohamed Mahmoud Street in November where 40 protesters were killed.

=== 2012 presidential campaign ===
Sabahi officially announced his intention to run for president. He promised that he will do his best to help Egypt become a democracy, where the law is truly above all and where citizens' rights are sacrosanct. In a press conference in March 2011, Sabahi promised that he would make the separation of powers more distinct, provide social equity and justice, and rid the Egyptian economy of monopoly and corruption. He promised economic reforms such as setting priorities for the national budget and setting a minimum wage for laborers.

In another press conference in October 2011, Sabahi said that his presidential campaign will focus on three aspects: "building a democratic system..., granting general freedoms, clarifying the separation of powers, limiting presidential power, guaranteeing the freedoms of political parties, syndicates and the media," while preserving citizens' rights to protest and go on strike. Regarding the economy and social justice, he said that he hopes to establish a state-capitalist Egypt in which the public and private sectors cooperate with one another. According to Sabahi, the Egyptian should be entitled to eight things: "housing, healthcare, food, free education, work, insurance and a fair wage, and a clean environment." He told his audience, "If I become president and do not fulfill these promises, I ask you to hold me accountable".

Another big concern for Sabahi is bringing Egypt's status as a regional power back. Sabahi reaffirmed his support for Article two of the 1971 Constitution which states that Shariʿa (Islamic) law is the main source of legislation and reasserted his belief that Egypt is an Arabic and Islamic country that "Muslims and Christians build together."

On 25 January 2012, the first anniversary of the revolution, Sabahi suggested that Egyptians in Egypt and abroad who possess 50 million Egyptian pounds (about $8.3 million) or more pay a 10% tax, which he called "Tahrir", once in their lifetime. He argued that this would be the first step to achieving social equity and justice as well as giving equal opportunity to all Egyptians.

Sabahi said that he would not run for president if the constitution to be drafted calls for a parliamentary system of government, for that system, he argued, would "create a new dictator." This is one of the reasons Sabahi wants the constitution to be written before presidential elections are held. "We need a parliament," he explained, "that is independent of the president and would hold him accountable." He argued that the danger of having a parliamentary system is that the prime minister, who would be chosen by a majority vote of the MPs, would be head of government. And because the MPs chose him, they would inevitably back and protect him.

Regarding the Supreme Council of the Armed Forces, Sabahi said that the council's performance in the beginning was very good, because they favored and sided with those in Tahrir Square. But relations eventually grew sour because of the council mismanaged the transitional phase. "They could have easily maintained the love and respect" people had for the military, he argued. "They could have easily established the stability they always spoke of. And much earlier on."

Prior to the elections, Sabahi trailed in the polls and was deemed the dark-horse candidate. However, he garnered over 21% of the vote putting him in third place. Mubarak-era minister Ahmed Shafiq beat Sabahi by a margin of around 700,000 votes earning him second place in the race and qualifying his entrance into the runoff with first-place winner Mohammad Morsi of the Freedom and Justice Party. Nonetheless, his popularity was a surprise to many analysts who did not expect Sabahi to win many votes because he lacked a party machine and organization outside the major cities. Most of his votes came from Alexandria and Port Said where he came in first and parts of Cairo, Dakhalia, Damietta, Suez and the Gharbiya Governorate. Since the announcement of the election results, Sabahi has lodged a formal complaint, alleging irregularities in the voting and questioning the legality of the candidature of Ahmed Shafiq.

=== Role following the military coup ===
In the aftermath of the military coup, defense minister General Abdul Fattah al-Sisi called for mass demonstrations on 26 July 2013 to grant his forces a "mandate" to crack down on "terrorism". While this announcement was rejected by Egyptian human rights groups and by many of the political movements that had initially supported the military coup, such as the revolutionary April 6 Youth Movement and the moderate Strong Egypt Party, Sabahi and his Popular Current movement sided with General Sisi and called on their supporters to participate in the demonstrations.

In August 2013, following a violent crackdown by security forces on a sit-in by supporters of deposed president Mohamed Morsi, in which hundreds of protesters were killed, Sabahi said in a telephone interview with Al-Hayat television that the national forces were behind the state apparatus to defeat terrorism: "We will stay hand in hand, the people, the army and the police."

In the interview, he also called for an emergency Arab summit to "support Egypt in the face of terrorism", saluted the position of the United Arab Emirates, Jordan, Kuwait and the King of Saudi Arabia, and called for an invitation to the presidents of Russia and China to visit Egypt and support its position.

Sabahi has censured a court conviction sentencing Ahmed Maher, Mohammed Adel and Ahmed Douma to three years in prison and a fine of LE50,000 and maintains that Interim President Adly Mansour should issue these and other detained individuals a pardon.

=== 2014 presidential campaign ===
Sabahi officially announced his presidential bid for the 2014 Egyptian presidential election on 8 February 2014. On 14 March 2014, Hamdeen Sabahi criticized Field Marshal Sisi and the transitional interim government, expressing doubt about Sisi's commitment to democracy, arguing that the general bears a measure of direct and indirect responsibility for the human rights violations carried out during the period of the interim government, and denouncing what he deems to be the transitional government's hostility toward the goals of the revolution. Sabahi was confirmed as a candidate in the 2014 presidential election on 2 May 2014. He stated that he would do away with the protest law if he was elected president. He stated that he would amend the Camp David Accords and would allow the Egyptian people to vote on it if he was elected president. Sabahi however failed to make any headway in the election, losing to Sisi (the only other candidate), who won more than 96% of the nearly 23 million votes cast.

=== Role after 2014 ===
After 2014 Sabahi stayed out of the political spotlight, attending meetings and gatherings with members of the Dignity Party from time to time, he participated in the Gaza war protests in Cairo. He attended a January 2026 gathering at his party's headquarters in Dokki where he called for the freedom of Nicolás Maduro and for people in Cairo to stand with the people in Caracas against American intervention.

== Political views ==
=== Mohamed Morsi ===
Sabahi argued in March 2013 that Mohamed Morsi, president of Egypt, is the "new Mubarak", but initially refused to endorse his overthrow by the military.

=== Israel ===
During a televised debate which aired on Al-Manar TV on 3 April 2014, Tamer Hindawi, who is a spokesman for Sabahi's presidential campaign, stated (as translated by MEMRI) that "Our enmity with the Zionist enemy goes to our very existence. It's either us or them. No peace is possible. That's what we believe. The Zionist enemy is clearly the head of colonialism in the region. In our view, the Camp David Accords are responsible for many of our crises, and might even be the main reason for Egypt's subjugation to America, and for the decline in its role as an Arab, Islamic, and African leader...Sabahi believes that the Zionists are our enemy, but when the historic moment arrives, he will decide what action to take." In the same interview, the spokesman for the al-Sisi campaign echoed the remarks, stated that "We support anyone who points his gun at the Zionist enemy. As long as they point their weapons at the Zionist enemy, we support them, but we are against anyone who turns his gun elsewhere."

=== Sabbahi demands new protest law ===
On 12 June 2014, on his Twitter account, Sabbahi called out over the internet for a new Egyptian protest law which organizes protests, and does not prevent or repression opposition. His remarks came after activist Alaa Abd El-Fattah and 24 others were sentenced to 15 years imprisonment in absentia in the Shura Council case one day earlier.
