= Amin Iskander =

Egyptian politician and writer (1952–2022)

Amin Iskander (Egyptian Arabic: أمين إسكندر, Coptic: ⲁⲙⲓⲛ ⲁⲗⲉⲝⲁⲛⲇⲣⲟⲥ; 1952 – November 2022) was an Egyptian politician, writer and activist. He was the co-founder, along with Hamdeen Sabahi, of the Dignity Party (Al-Karama) and was a member of the People's Assembly. He is considered a veteran Nasserist and a long-time advocate of pan-Arab unity. He has authored several books specializing in Egyptian and Arab politics. He is a resident of Shobra and a Coptic Christian. He died in November 2022.

== Political career ==
=== Early activism ===
Iskander began his career in activism as a staunch Nasserist. Throughout the 1970s, during the presidency of Anwar Sadat, he was part of the anti-Sadat student movement and won in two student union elections. He also participated in the anti-austerity protests of 1977 which resulted in his arrest. He was arrested two more times, during the 1980 parliamentary elections and in 1983 for suspicions of being part of a clandestine Nasserist organization. He was severely tortured during his latter stint in prison.

When the Arab Democratic Nasserist Party (ADNP) was legalized in 1992 Iskander joined the party, which was founded by Diaa al-Din Dawoud, but later left the party in 1998 along with other members of the "new guard" after disagreements with the party's leaders. Along with former ADNP cadre Hamdeen Sabahi, Iskander co-founded the Dignity Party (Al-Karama). He continued his activism, being instrumental in the establishment of the Egyptian-Palestinian solidarity movement in 2000 after the start of the Second Intifada (Palestinian uprising) against the Israeli occupation. He also helped organize protests against the 2003 invasion of Iraq and the ensuing occupation.

These protests, together with wide disapproval of Hosni Mubarak's policies in Egypt, eventually culminated with the founding of Kefaya, a grassroots opposition movement. Iskander was one of the principal leaders of the movement and became a vocal opponent of the planned, succession of Gamal Mubarak, Hosni's son, to the presidency which Iskander criticized as "presidential inheritance."

=== Egyptian revolution and aftermath ===
Iskander joined the youth-led protests of the 2011 Egyptian revolution on its first day, 25 January and was arrested by security forces while protesting in Cairo's Shobra district on the first day. He continued protesting after his release on 27 January. He became the Dignity Party's secretary-general in 2011. Iskander strongly condemned the killing of mostly Coptic Christians protesters during the Maspero demonstrations on 9 October. During the 2011-2012 Egyptian parliamentary election, Iskander represented the Dignity Party and was part of the Democratic Alliance. He won a seat in Cairo's First District (Al-Sahel).

== Works ==
- The Search for the Egyptian Personality (1968, Al-Jumhuriyyah)
- Saddam Husayn: Struggler, Thinker and Human Being (1980, Hachette)
