= Saad Eddin Ibrahim =

Egyptian sociologist and author (1938–2023)

- سعد الدين إبراهيم
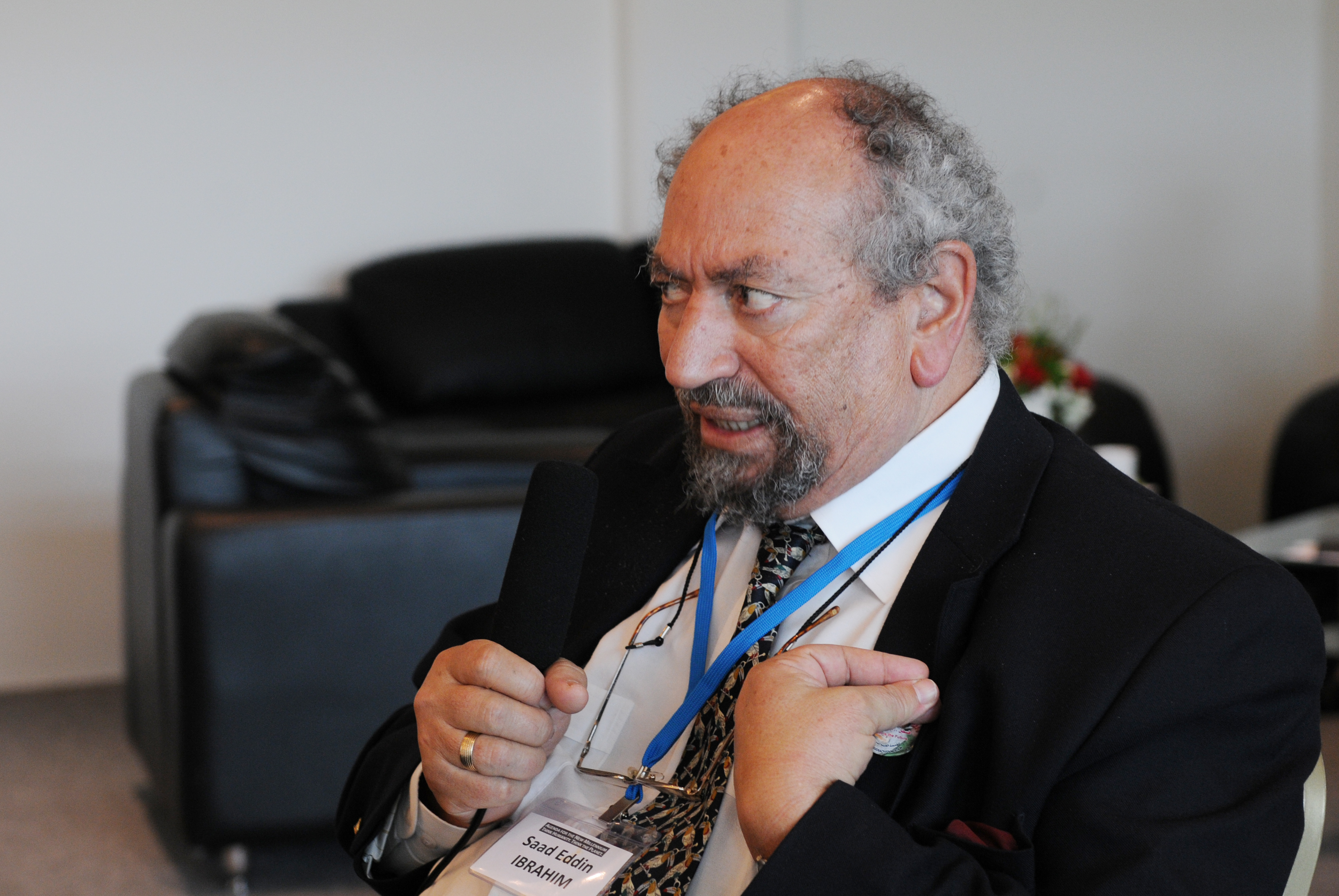
- Ibrahim in 2009
- Born: 31 December 1938; Bedeen, Mansoura, Egypt
- Died: 29 September 2023 (aged 84)

Saad Eddin Ibrahim (Arabic: سعد الدين إبراهيم, IPA: [ˈsæʕd edˈdiːn ebɾˤɑˈhiːm]) (31 December 1938 – 29 September 2023) was an Egyptian sociologist and author. He was one of Egypt's leading human rights and democracy activists and a strong critic of former Egyptian President Hosni Mubarak.

== Biography ==
Born in Bedeen, Mansoura, Egypt, Ibrahim was credited with playing a leading role in the revival of Egypt's contemporary research-based civil society movement. For most of his professional career, Ibrahim was a professor in the American University in Cairo's (AUC) Department of Sociology, having previously taught sociology at Indiana's DePauw University from 1967 to 1974. He was a visiting professor at UCLA in Los Angeles in the spring of 1979, and on leave from AUC to serve as Secretary General of the Arab Thought Forum, chaired by Crown Prince Hassan of Jordan from 1984 to 1989. He founded both the Ibn Khaldun Center for Development Studies in Cairo and the Arab Organization for Human Rights. He was married to Barbara Ibrahim, the director of the Gerhart Center for Civic Engagement and Philanthropy in Cairo; they have two children, Randa and Amir Ibrahim, and four grandchildren, Lara and Seif (through Randa) and Adam and Gebriel (through Amir).

Well before his confrontations with the Egyptian government in the early 2000s, Ibrahim had become a controversial figure in Egypt. He reversed his earlier criticism of Anwar Sadat for his peace initiative with Israel. He gained the respect of Egypt's human rights and civil society community for championing different causes, including Copts, Baháʼís. and other minorities at a time of rising sectarian tensions.

Ibrahim was arrested, imprisoned and prosecuted in 2000 for using European Union funds for election monitoring, and for allegedly defaming Egypt's image abroad. He was sentenced to seven years in prison. His defence team countered that the real motive behind the government's prosecution of Ibrahim and his assistants was his outspoken criticism of President Hosni Mubarak and his administration. He was tried twice on the same charges in State Security Courts, winning each time on appeal. During a third trial before the highest civil court in 2003, he was cleared of all charges and released, but not before a storm of international protest had put the Mubarak regime on the defensive. The High Court ruling was 35 pages long and makes for important reading. It stated that as a public intellectual, Ibrahim's writing and other civic activities were protected. It also ruled that the executive branch of Egypt's government had overstepped its bounds in repeatedly prosecuting the case. As an independent-minded intellectual, Ibrahim has supported fair elections when they were viewed as incompatible with Egyptian politics, promoted international democratic alliances, and accepted NGO funding from any source that shares peaceful and democratic values, including those in the US. He was attacked in the official press for calling on the U.S. Congress to condition its military aid to Egypt on improvements in the country's human rights record and the freeing of political prisoners.

In 2006 Ibrahim was awarded the Ion Ratiu Democracy Lecture Prize at the Woodrow Wilson International Center for Scholars, where he previously had been a public policy scholar. He has won over 20 other international and regional awards for his scholarly and human rights work.

In 2007 Ibrahim went into voluntary exile when he learned of Mubarak's renewed fury over organizing a regional Conference on Arab Democracy in Qatar, and for speaking briefly about Egypt to President George Bush when both addressed a conference of global Freedom Fighters organized in Prague by Vaclav Havel. He lived and taught abroad from 2007 until Mubarak's fall from power in February 2011. In exile, Ibrahim was invited to teach graduate courses for two semesters at Istanbul Culture University, then in 2008-2009 he was a visiting professor at Indiana Law School and then a visiting scholar at Harvard University, Center for Middle East Studies. Drew University hosted him as Visiting Wallerstien Scholar at the Center on Religion, Culture and Conflict from 2009 to 2011.

While living in exile he retired from 34 years on the Sociology faculty at American University in Cairo and was made Emeritus Professor. He continued to write a widely syndicated weekly column for El Masry el Youm newspaper and to host a weekly open seminar in Cairo at the Ibn Khaldun Center for Development Studies (IKDS).

Saad Eddin Ibrahim died on 29 September 2023, at the age of 84.

== Sentence ==
On 2 August 2008, an Egyptian court sentenced Ibrahim to two years of prison for 'defaming Egypt'. He was granted a bail of £E10,000 (US$1,890) and his lawyer expressed his will to appeal. He was reportedly living in exile outside of Egypt, to avoid probable arrest upon his return.

Sources close to Ibrahim reported a further 17 court cases were filed against him in 2008 and therefore he faced certain arrest if he returned to Egypt. On Wednesday, 5 August 2010, Ibrahim returned to Cairo for a visit with his family. He was allowed to enter and leave, while many of the spurious court cases against him had been dismissed in court. He returned permanently to Cairo on 12 February 2011, within hours of Mubarak's departure from office and to celebrate the short-lived fruits of the 25 January revolution.

== See also ==
- Asmaa Mahfouz
- Kefaya
- Ayman Nour - an Egyptian opposition leader, founder of the Tomorrow Party
- Nonviolent resistance
- 2011 Egyptian Revolution
- April 6 Youth Movement
