= Amr Ali =

Amr Ali may refer to:

- Amr Ali (youth leader), leader of the April 6 Movement in Egypt
- Amr Ali (wrestler), Egyptian Olympic wrestler
- Amr Ali (fashion designer), founder of the London-based fashion label Bodyamr
