= Mohammed Adel =

Egyptian politician

- محمد عادل
- Born: August 8, 1988 (age 38); Egypt
- Occupation: Political activist
- Years active: 2005–present
- Known for: Co-founder of the April 6 Youth Movement
- Notable work: Advocacy for democracy and human rights in Egypt
- Movement: April 6 Youth Movement, Kefaya
- Criminal charges: Violating protest laws, assaulting police officers (2013)
- Criminal penalty: 3 years in prison, LE50,000 fine
- Criminal status: Released

Mohammed Adel (Arabic: محمد عادل, Egyptian Arabic: [mæˈħæmːæd ˈʕæːdel]; born August 8, 1988) is an Egyptian political activist and a founder of the April 6 Youth Movement in Egypt. He has been active with the Kefaya movement since 2005 and is one of activists who called for a general strike on April 6, 2008. In 2009, Mohammed Adel became the April 6 movement's media spokesman. Between the time of the 2008 strike in Mahalla al-Kubra and the onset of the 2011 Egyptian Revolution, Mohemmad Adel enrolled in a training program directed by the Center for Non-Violent Action and Strategies, an entity founded by the Serbian pro-democracy youth movement Otpor!.

== 2013 revolutionary activism ==
Mohammed Adel was tried by a Cairo misdemeanor court on charges of violating a controversial protest law and for allegedly assaulting police officers. On December 22, the court declared him to be guilty of violating the protest law, sentencing him and two other defendants, Ahmed Maher and Ahmed Douma, to three years of hard labor in prison, a requirement to pay a fine of LE50,000, and subjection to a three-year period of surveillance upon release from jail. Various Egyptian and international human rights organizations have condemned the trial as a symptom of a growing crackdown on pro-democracy and civil society activism; during the course of the trial, Amnesty International stated that the charges against Adel and other defendants "may arise solely from their opposition activism". Emad Hamdi, a member of the Egyptian Popular Current, condemned the verdict against Mohammed Adel, unfavorably juxtaposing the acquittals and light sentences given to Mubarak-era criminals with those being issued against revolutionary and democratic activists.

In the initial stages of the trial, Mohammed Adel was being tried in absentia. However, shortly before the verdict was announced, he was forcibly seized by police during the course of a raid on the Egyptian Centre for Economic and Social Rights. Police smashed some computers while confiscating other computers, electronic equipment, and documents. They also assaulted and detained a number of individuals present at the scene.

Hamdeen Sabahi has censured the court conviction sentencing Ahmed Maher, Mohamed Adel, and Ahmed Douma to three years in prison and a fine of LE50,000 and maintains that interim president Adly Mansour should issue these and other detained individuals a pardon. The Constitution Party has expressed solidarity with the detainees and their families and requested that the interim president Adly Mansour issue a pardon to Ahmed Maher, Mohammed Adel, and Ahmed Douma, as well as to Loay Abdel Rahman, Omar Hussein, Islam Ahmed and Nasser Ibrahim.

== Return to civil life ==
Following liberation Abel returned to civil life. He expressed opposition president Sisi, describing his government as injust and bloody. Adel regularly calls for freedom for all detainees and prisoners activists.

Adel opposed Egypt's decision of selling the two islands Tiran and Sanafir to the Saudi kingdom.

== See also ==
- Ahmed Maher
- Ahmed Douma
- Alaa Abd El-Fattah
- Road of the Revolution Front
- April 6 Youth Movement
- Kefaya
