= Ahmed Douma =

Egyptian activist (born 1988)

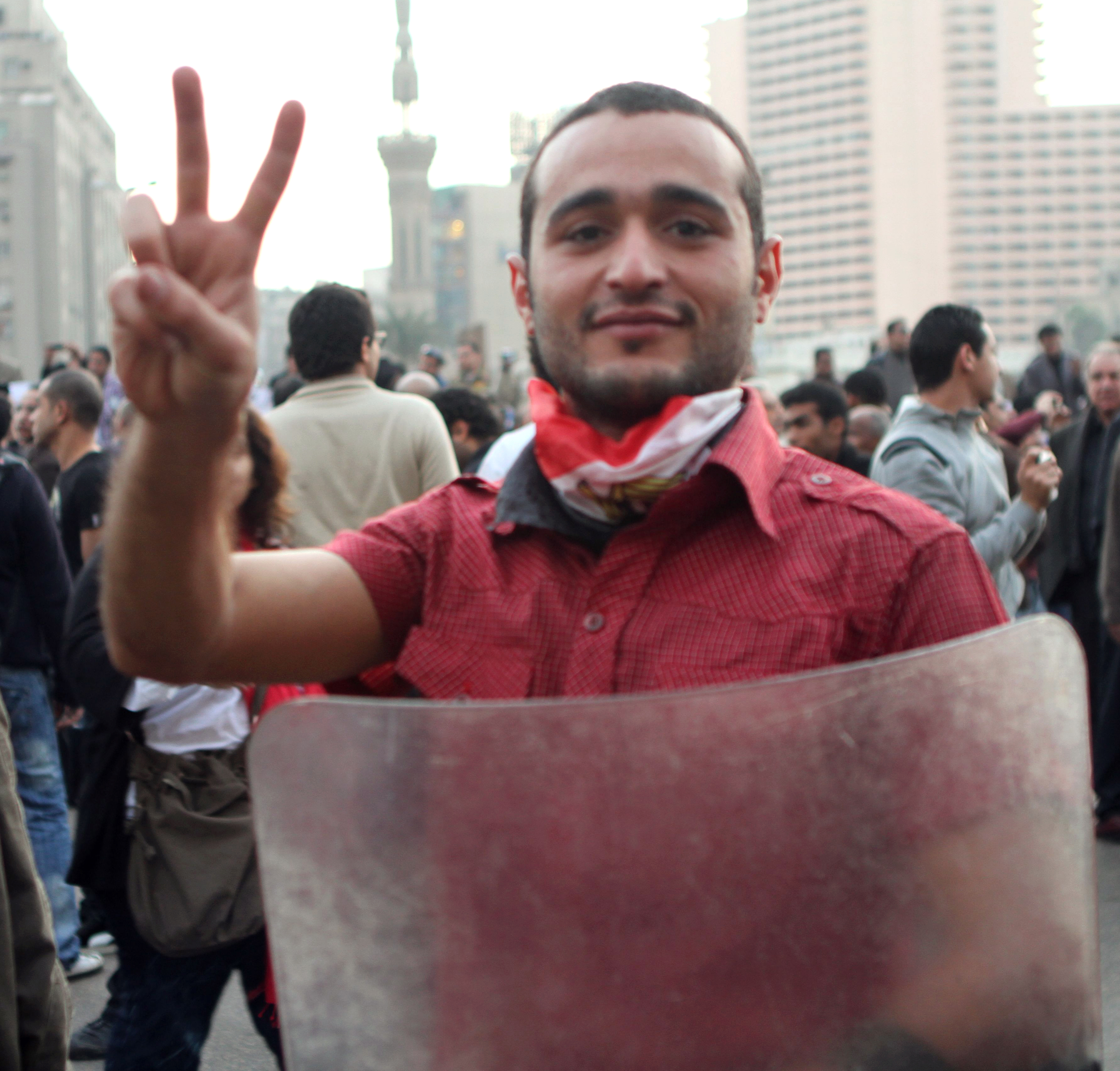
Douma in Cairo during the "Day of Anger", 25 January 2011

Ahmed Douma (Arabic: أحمد دومة, pronounced [ˈæħmæd ˈduːmæ]; born 11 September 1988) is an Egyptian activist and blogger, who has been arrested under each consecutive Egyptian government in recent years. He is a member of the Egyptian Popular Current. Having been in prison since 2013, he was released on 19 August 2023 following a presidential pardon.

== Political activism and arrests ==
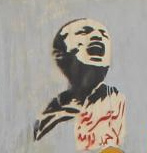
A graffiti image of Douma on a wall near the American University in Cairo

In February 2009, Ahmed Douma, then a student at Tanta University, was arrested at the border to the Gaza Strip, after he had entered it with a group of anti-war activists who wanted to express their solidarity with the Palestinian people. He was tried before a military court for illegally crossing the border and was sentenced to one year in prison. During his transport to the prison and during interrogations there, Douma was tortured and threatened with the use of false confessions to obtain further convictions against him.

In January 2012, he was detained and charged with inciting violence against the army and encouraging attacks on public property, following the Cabinet clashes in December 2011. During these clashes, 12 people were killed and 815 were injured, when police and military forces cracked down on a sit-in outside the Cabinet office in Cairo, which was organized by activists protesting against the appointment of Kamal Ganzouri as prime minister by the Supreme Council of the Armed Forces.

In April 2013, Douma was arrested after calling president Mohammed Morsi a killer and a criminal, and on 3 June Douma was convicted to six months in prison for insulting the president. However, Douma appealed the verdict, and on 6 July another court ordered his release without bail.

On 3 December 2013, Douma was arrested at his home, following a protest organized by the No Military Trials for Civilians campaign in defiance of a new restrictive protest law, which was violently dispersed by the police. On 22 December, he was sentenced, together with Ahmed Maher and Mohammed Adel, to three years in prison with hard labour and a fine of LE50,000 for his participation in protests illegal under the new protest law. In an attempt to reverse the verdict, Douma joined a hunger strike with other detainees who were imprisoned under the new protest law. However, he had to end it due to his deteriorating health.

The verdict was condemned by several Egyptian human rights organisations, as well as by the High Representative of the European Union for Foreign Affairs Catherine Ashton and the United Kingdom Foreign Office. On 23 December, the Road of the Revolution Front organized a demonstration in Cairo in solidarity with the three activists. Hamdeen Sabahi has censured the court conviction sentencing Maher, Mohamed Adel, and Douma to three years in prison and a fine of LE50,000 and maintains that Interim President Adly Mansour should issue these and other detained individuals a pardon. The Constitution Party has expressed solidarity with the detainees and their families and requested that the interim President Adly Mansour issue a pardon to Ahmed Maher, Mohammed Adel, and Ahmed Douma, as well as to Loay Abdel Rahman, Omar Hussein, Islam Ahmed, and Nasser Ibrahim.

On 4 February 2015, the Cairo Criminal Court sentenced Douma to life imprisonment and fined him LE17 million.

In January 2019, his sentence for participating in the 2011 protests against the administration of President Hosni Mubarak was reduced to 15 years.

On 3 December 2022, Douma completed a decade in arbitrary detention. His family raised multiple requests for a presidential pardon and reconsideration of the activist's case. The family renewed their call in 2022. On 24 November 2022, the European Parliament also called for the Egyptian authorities to immediately release the unjustly detained prisoners, including Douma. Dozens of human rights organizations and groups, including Amnesty International, MENA Rights Group, Democracy for the Arab World Now (DAWN), and others, also urged the Egyptian authorities to immediately and unconditionally release Douma.

Douma was pardoned by Egyptian president Abdel Fattah el-Sisi on 19 August 2023.

He was arrested on unknown charges in January 2026, as part of a flurry of persecution against activists, including Aida Seif el-Dawla and Mahienour El-Massry. He was released after being detained for 12 hours following the payment of a 100, 000 EGP.

On 6 April 2026, the Supreme State Security Prosecution ordered Douma's detention for four days, citing an ongoing investigation, after Douma complied with summons for questioning on charges of "publishing false news and statements". On 9 April, the Advisory chamber for Misdemeanours in Badr and El Shorouk authorised the extension of Douma's detention for a further 15 days. He was sentenced to one year in prison.

Douma filed an appeal against his sentence on 3 June 2026. On 16 July, the Fifth Settlement Appellate Misdemeanour Court upheld Douma's sentence.

== Writing ==
Douma wrote about his incarceration experiences, dreams, and aspirations in his poetry. He published his poetry collection Soutak Talee (Your Voice Is Heard) in 2012 with Diwan publishing house, where he shared his revolutionary poetry and his experiences with several youth and reformist movements in Egypt. He documented the dates and locations during his imprisonment at the end of this poem, in which he told his story of imprisonment and oppression.

Also, his poetry collection Curly was printed and published during the 2021 Cairo International Book Fair through EL Maraya publishing house. However, security officials barged into the publishing house section during the fair and asked them to take Douma's poetry collection down.

== See also ==
- Alaa Abd El-Fattah
- Mohammed Adel
- Ahmed Harara
- Ahmed Maher
- Kefaya
