= Amr Ali (youth leader) =

Egyptian political activist

- عمرو على
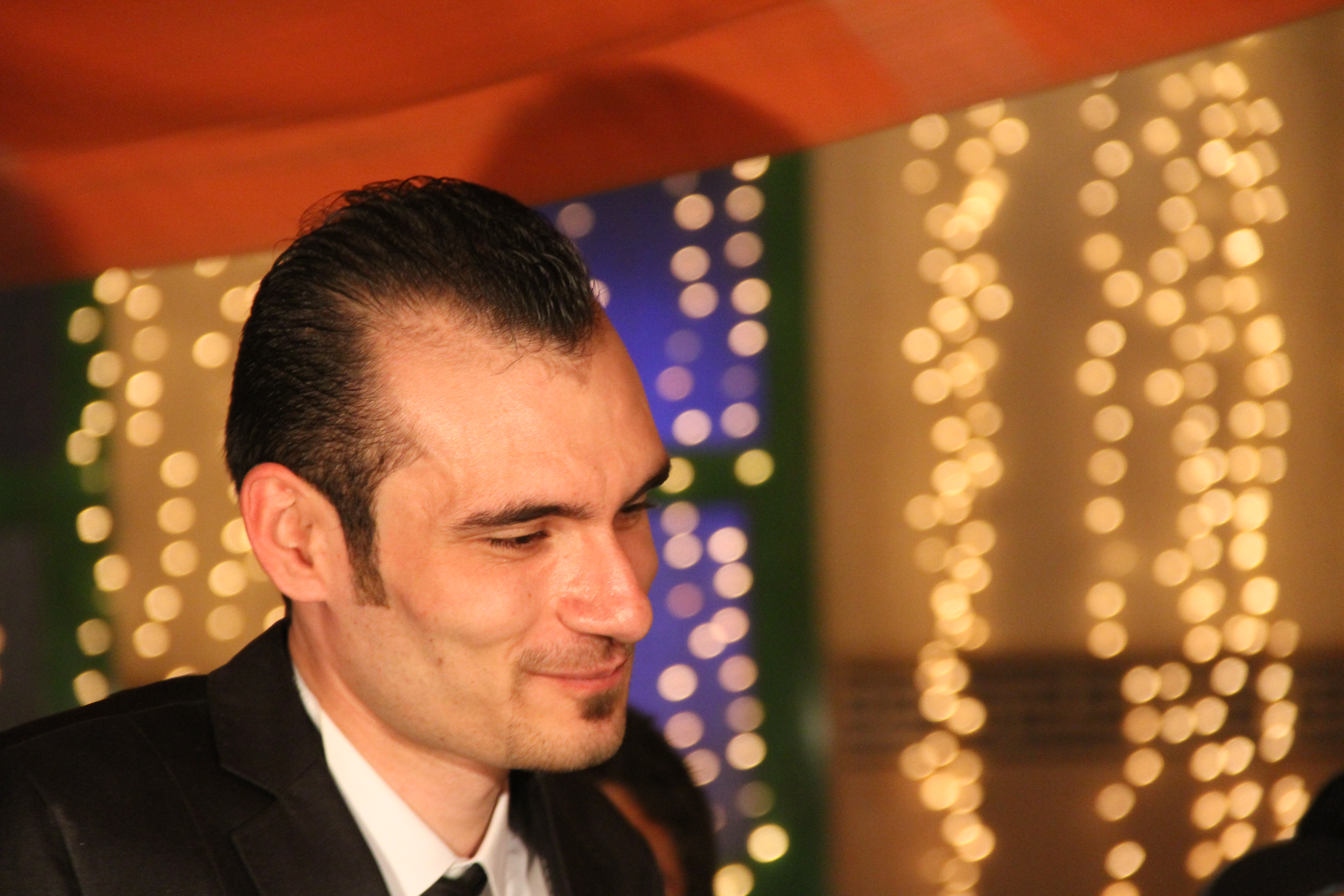
- Born: c. 1988
- Occupations: political activist; information technology manager
- Known for: Member of the April 6 Youth Movement
- Criminal penalty: Three-year prison sentence (2016)

Amr Ali (Egyptian Arabic: عمرو على pronounced [ˈʕɑmɾe ˈʕæli]; ca. 1988) is a member of the April 6 Youth Movement and Egyptian political activist.

Amr Ali was responsible for the April 6 movement's public works and community operations from September 2009 to August 2011, and was a member of the movement's political office from September 2011 until October 2013. He is an information technology manager from Cairo and currently works as information technology manager at Tenth of Ramadan Investors Association.

On March 6, 2016, he was sentenced to three years of prison.

== Election as Coordinator of the April 6 Movement ==
In 2013, the 6 April movement held internal elections to determine who would succeed Ahmed Maher as the organization's coordinator. The vote resulted in Amr Ali's elevation as the movement's new coordinator.
