= Freedom for the Brave =

- Founded at: Egypt
- Type: civil society
- Legal status: Active
- Location: Egypt
- Website: US Chapter

Freedom for the Brave is a civil society organization and action campaign designed to advocate and advance the rights of Egyptian prisoners and detainees. Freedom for the Brave was established in response to a drastic diminishment of the human rights situation that has been ongoing in Egypt since late 2013. Reports of widespread state sanctioned torture, rape, murder, abduction, molestation, unlawful detentions, the existence of unsupervised, clandestine “black site” prisons, and usage of illegal judicial procedures in violation of the law have been cited by the founders of Freedom for the Brave as key motivations for their work.

The campaign espouses governmental adherence to human rights and constitutional standards and seeks to ameliorate the conditions of prisoners without regard to their political predilections. Freedom for the Brave has provided services to assist political prisoners, prisoners of conscience, hunger strikers, and victims of torture. The movement has cooperated with other Egyptian social and political forces in advancing the movement's objectives, including the Constitution Party, No To Military Trials, the Egyptian Social Democratic Party, the April 6 movement, the Dignity Party, the Socialist Popular Alliance Party, the Freedom Egypt Party, the Bread and Freedom Party, and the Egyptian Popular Current.
