= Barbara Ibrahim =

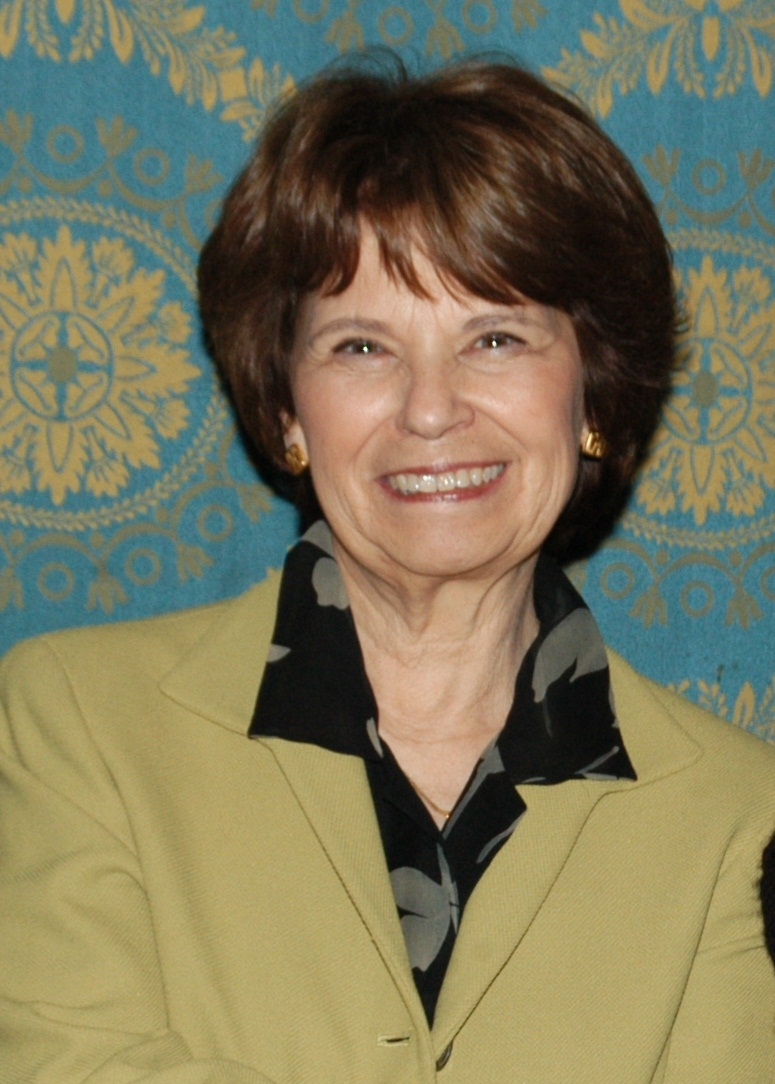
Dr. Barbara Lethem Ibrahim

Barbara Lethem Ibrahim (born March 21, 1949) is the founding director of the John D. Gerhart Center for Philanthropy and Civic Engagement at the American University in Cairo. Internationally recognized as a prominent sociologist of the Arab world,

== History ==
Ibrahim has published widely in the areas of gender and health, Arab philanthropy, women's employment and youth studies. Prior to founding the Gerhart Center in 2006, Ibrahim was regional director for West Asia and North Africa at the Population Council in Egypt. She had previously served as the Middle East program officer for urban poverty and women's studies programs for the Ford Foundation. Ibrahim serves on numerous international boards, speaks widely on the current youth generation in Egypt and the Arab region, and is a Core Group Member of the Arab Families Working Group. Ibrahim earned a Bachelor of Arts in Sociology from DePauw University, an Master of Arts in sociology from the American University of Beirut in 1975, and a Ph.D. in sociology from Indiana University Bloomington in 1980. She received the Lifetime Achievement Award of the Association of Middle East Women’s Studies in 2003, and was inducted into the International Educators' Hall of Fame in 1999.

== Personal life ==
She is married to Saad Eddin Ibrahim, an Egyptian American sociologist and one of Egypt's leading human rights and democracy activists.

== Selected publications ==
- Ibrahim, Barbara L. and Leah Hunt-Hendrix. 2011. "Youth, Service and Pathways to Democracy in Contemporary Egypt." Paper presented at the annual meeting for the Society of Biblical Literature, Amman, Jordan, April 16–17.
- Ibrahim, Barbara L. and Dina Sherif, eds. 2008. From Charity to Social Change: Trends in Arab Philanthropy. Cairo: American University in Cairo Press. (Arabic version 2010)
- Ibrahim, Barbara L. 2006. “Strengthening Philanthropy and Civic Engagement in the Arab World: A Mission for the John D. Gerhart Center.” Voices in Philanthropy and Civic Engagement, Working Paper #1, American University in Cairo, October 2006.
- Ibrahim, Barbara L., Martha Brady, and Rania Salem. 2004. "Negotiating Leadership Roles: Young Women’s Experience in Rural Egypt," in “Women and Development: Rethinking Policy and Reconceptualizing Practice,” special issue Women’s Studies Quarterly.
- Ibrahim, Barbara L., Barbara S. Mensch, Susan M. Lee, and Omaima El-Gibaly. 2003. "Gender-role Attitudes among Egyptian Adolescents." Studies in Family Planning 34 no.1 (March): pages 8-18.
- Ibrahim, Barbara L. and Diane Singerman. 2003. "The Costs of Marriage in Egypt: A Hidden Variable in the New Arab Demography." In The New Arab Family edited by Nicholas S. Hopkins. Cairo: American University in Cairo Press. And in Cairo Papers in Social Science 24(1-2): pages 80-116.
- Ibrahim, Barbara L., Omaima El-Gibaly, Barbara Mensch, and Wesley Clark. 2002. “Decline in Female Circumcision in Egypt: Evidence and Interpretation.” Social Science and Medicine 54 no. 2 (January).
- Ibrahim, Barbara L. Sahar El-Tawila, Cynthia Loyd, Barbara Mensch et al. 2000. "The School Environment in Egypt: A Situation Analysis of Public Preparatory Schools." Cairo: The Population Council. (In English and Arabic).
- Ibrahim, Barbara L., Sahar el Tawila et al. 1999. "Transitions to Adulthood: A National Survey of Egyptian Adolescents." Cairo: The Population Council. (In English and Arabic).
- Ibrahim, Barbara L. and Hind Wassef. 1999. "Caught Between Two Worlds: Youth in the Egyptian Hinterland." In Alienation or Integration: Arab Youth Between Family, the State and the Street. Richmond, Surrey: Curazon Press.

== See also ==
- Youth Studies
- Gender Studies
- Feminism
- Sociology
- Egypt
- Human rights
