= Philip Bloom (filmmaker) =

British filmmaker

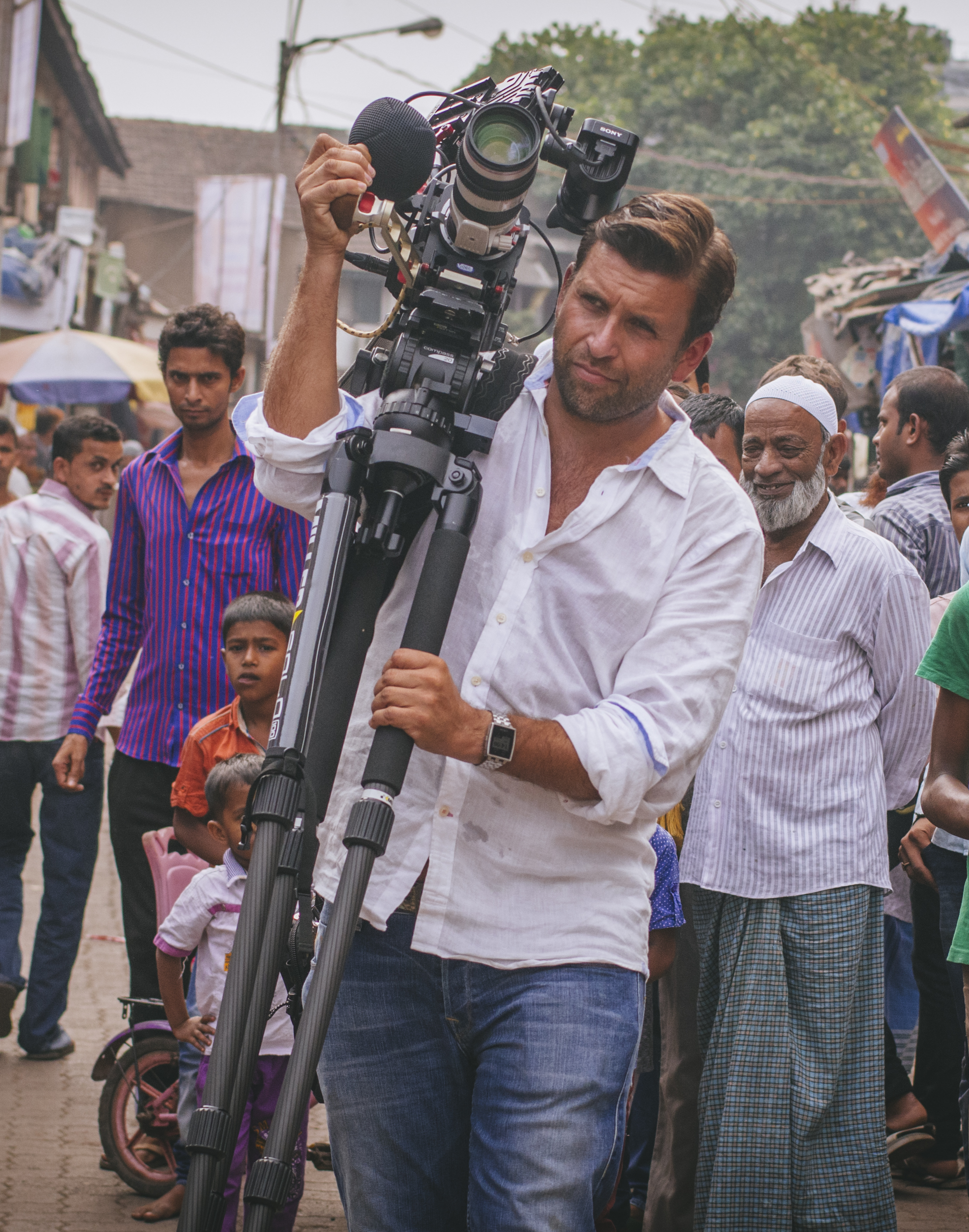
- Born: 1971 (age 54–55)
- Occupations: Filmmaker, Director, Cinematographer, Educator
- Known for: DSLR Filmmaking, Digital Cinematography
- Notable work: How To Start A Revolution, The Wonder List, Salient Minus Ten
- Website: http://www.philipbloom.net/

Philip Bloom (born 20 May 1971) is a British filmmaker known for his DSLR filmmaking, blog, YouTube channel and education. He has worked as a cinematographer and cameraman for Lucasfilm, CNN, Sky News and the BBC.

== Career ==
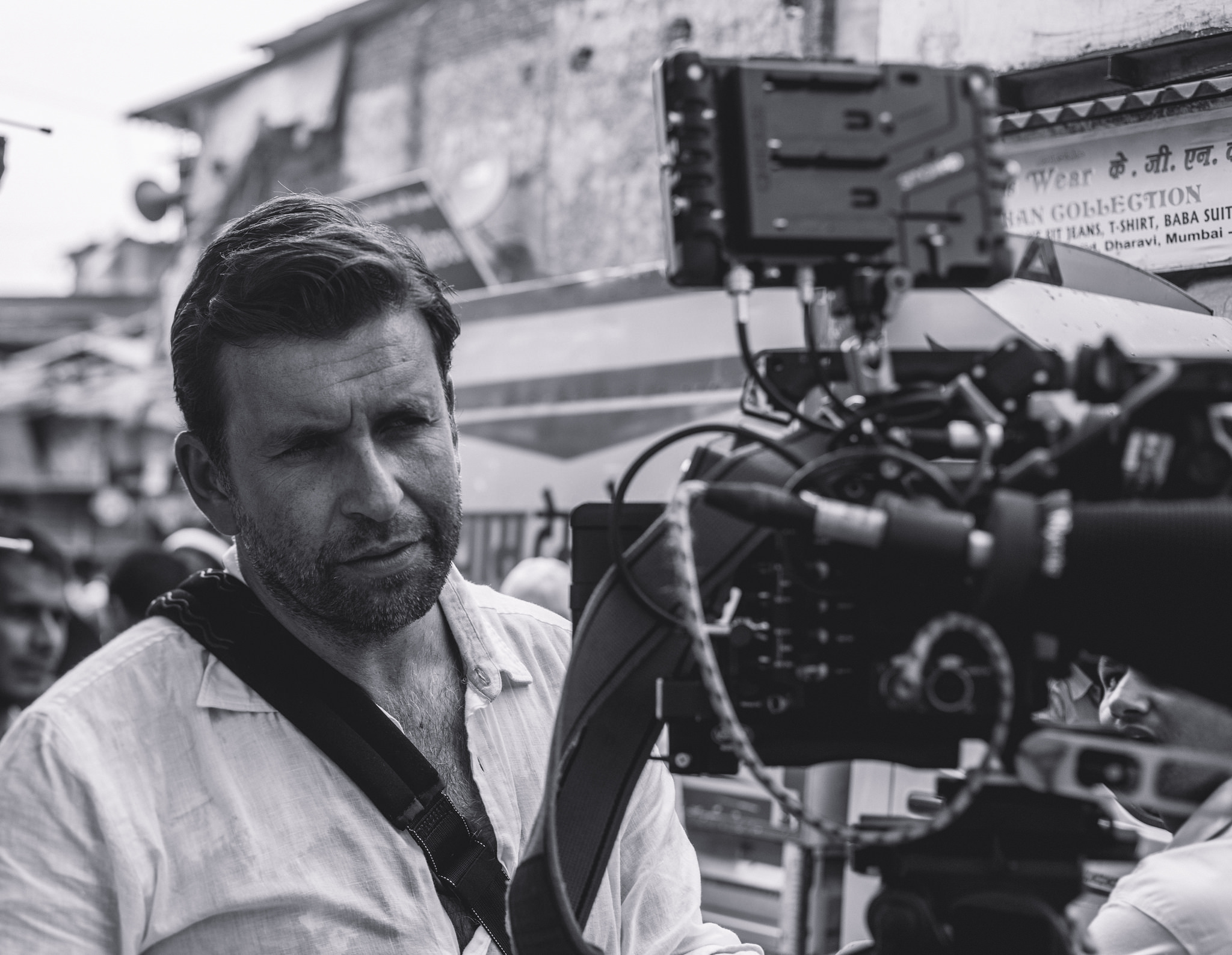
Philip Bloom filming in Mumbai India, June 2014

He began his filmmaking career at Sky News, working for the broadcaster between 1989 and 2006 as a cameraman/editor. His recent credits include work with Lucasfilm, Discovery HD, Five, Living, Sky One, and more.

In 2009 he was called up by Rick McCallum to help shoot with Canon DSLRs on the set of Lucasfilm's Red Tails.

Bloom with George Lucas on the set of "Red Tails"

In 2011 Bloom made the documentary film How to Start a Revolution with Ruaridh Arrow about Nobel Peace Prize nominee Gene Sharp, which premiered at the 27th annual Boston Film Festival and won Best Documentary, as well as the Mass Impact Award. It also won Best Documentary at the Raindance Film Festival Best Documentary Fort Lauderdale International Film Festival 2011, Special Jury Award One World Film Festival Ottawa, Jury Award Bellingham Human Rights Film Festival and Best Film, Barcelona Human Rights Film Festival and a BAFTA Scotland award.

In 2012 he was the first cameraman using the novel Panasonic Lumix DMC-GH3 of the Micro Four Thirds system creating the film Genesis.

In 2013, Bloom created a short film for the "Pro Photographer, Cheap Camera Challenge" (created by website DigitalRev TV) in which photographers and filmmakers, who are used to working with advanced and expensive gear, are given cheap, often very low quality equipment to create an original work. Bloom was instructed to create a short film using the Video Girl Barbie, a Barbie doll released in 2010 which features an embedded video camera in its chest, boasting a 1.2MP camera and 240p recorded video.

In March 2014 his short film "Koh Yao Noi" won "Best Travel / Landscape Film" at the NYC Drone Film Festival.

In July 2014, he released the short film "Now I See" which showcased the low light performance of the Sony A7S.

In November 2015 he reviewed the Sony A7S II for the BBC News "Click" technology show.

In 2017 he released his first education course for MZed "Philip Bloom's Cinematic Masterclass". In 2019 he followed this up with "Filmmaking For Photographers".

In 2019 his documentary "The Skiathos Cats" won the "Make a better world" award at the Arcosanti Film Carnivale.

In 2019 he won Best Cinematography for "Salient Minus Ten" at the Stormy Weather Horror Fest.

From 2014-2016 he filmed CNN's The Wonder List with Bill Weir show which took him around the world. In 2015 he appeared on Anderson Cooper 360 with Weir to talk about the show.

His YouTube channel was started in 2007 and is one of the longest running camera review channels. As of March 2024 it has over 260,000 subscribers.

He has been a guest on Channel Five's "The Gadget Show" twice; in 2014 and in 2020.

== Fundraising Work ==
Since 2008 Bloom has been fundraising for the Movember Foundation. To date he has raised over £275,000.

In March 2023 he was awarded the "Services to the Mo" award, Movember's liftemtime achievement award.

In 2011 his fundraiser for the Japan earthquake raised over $40,000.

Also in 2011 his fundraiser for the Christchurch earthquake in New Zealand raised over $11,000.

In 2018 Bloom made a number of documentaries to raise money for a cat charity on the Greek island of Skiathos. They reached their goal of €130,000 in November 2019 so they could buy their own land after being evicted from their original location.
