= Salma Sabahi =

Salma Sabahy
- Born: March 8, 1981 (age 45)
- Occupations: TV Presenter HTV Channel, Singer
- Years active: 2
- Employer: HTV Channel
- Criminal charge: Electronic Network Fraud
- Criminal penalty: 3 years in prison
- Parent: Hamdeen Sabahi

Salma Sabahi is the daughter of politician, Hamdeen Sabahi, and is best known for her activism during and following the Egyptian Arab Spring uprising in 2011. After the uprising she gained popularity as a television host for the show el-Beet. In 2013 she was brought up on fraud accusations until an overturn on the decision in December 2013.

== Background and personal life ==
Salma Sabahi is originally from Cairo, Egypt and is the daughter of Hamdeen Sabahi, a Nasserist politician and Egyptian presidential candidate in 2012. Hamdeen Sabahil is also the co-founder of the National Salvation Front, the main organization credited with the ousting of former President Mohammed Morsi. Salma is also known for supporting her family's political activism through social media (Facebook). Salma Sabahi is best known as a singer during the Egyptian uprising in 2011 and more recently as a TV host for the show el-Beet on the HTV Channel, in which she has been a host for the past two years. The show covers current topics of discussion such as home decorations, dieting, and health.

Most notably, Salma Sabahi was greatly involved in the 2011 Egyptian uprising through her music. On January 25, 2011 she uploaded her song "Al-Sha'b" ("The People") to her YouTube channel. Her inspiration for the song came from the Tunisian uprisings that took place on January 14, 2011. Furthermore, "Sabahi wanted to dedicate the lyrics of al-Shabbi's poem to the Egyptian protesters on that day". The next day when she awoke to mass protests in the streets, she was estatic at the response.

== Fraud accusations ==
On May 22, 2013, Salma Sabahi turned herself into authorities after being charged for fraud. Sabahi was charged with soliciting at least $23,000 through an online company called Global Ad Mart. In a supposed "classic Ponzi scheme", Sabahi was accused of targeting friends and strangers to watch a few short videos every month in order to make 50% profit off their investment. Sabahi denied all charges.

Salma Sabahi was convicted for a prison sentence of three years and fined LE1,000. She was released on bail of LE30,000. She was prosecuted along with seven other individuals involved.

In December 2013, Sabahi was acquitted of her convictions, overturning her conviction and previous fine. Salma denies all the charges and has made public claims that the legal trouble she has been facing is a part of a smear campaign against her father.
