= Aida Seif el-Dawla =

Egyptian human rights activist (born 1954)

- عايدة سيف الدّولة
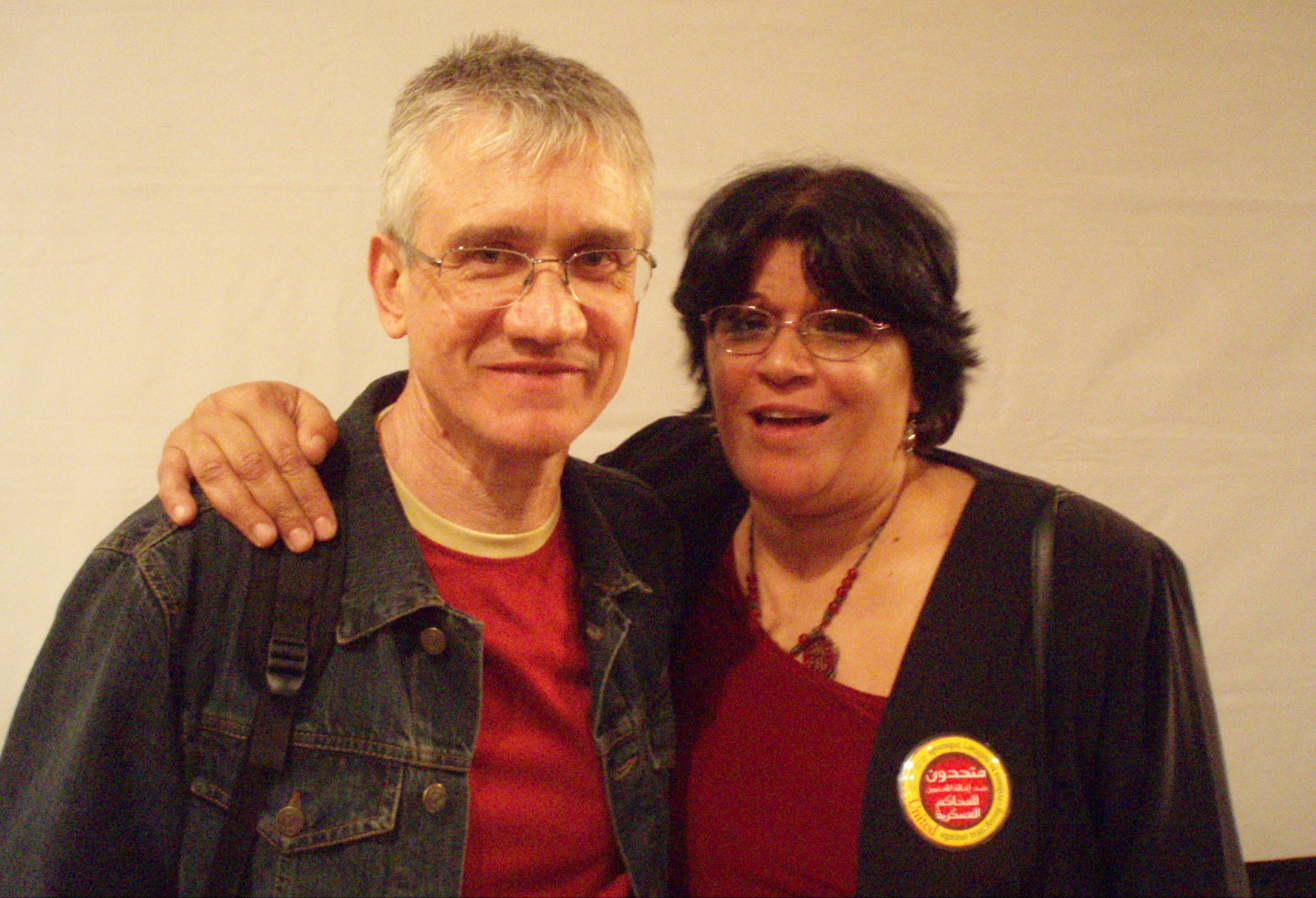
- El-Dawla (right) in 2007
- Born: 1954 (age 71–72); Cairo, Egypt
- Education: Ain Shams University
- Occupations: Human rights activist Psychiatrist
- Years active: 1978–present
- Organization(s): El Nadeem Centre for the Rehabilitation of Victims of Violence and Torture
- Known for: Support of victims of torture in Egypt

Aida Seif el-Dawla (Arabic: عايدة سيف الدّولة; born 1954) is an Egyptian human rights activist. She is known for her advocacy for victims of torture, as well as her activism against female genital mutilation and violence against women. As a result of el-Dawla's activism, she has experienced persecution from Egyptian authorities, including being charged in 2026 of spreading false news.

== Early life and education ==
El-Dawla was born in 1954 into a politically active family in Cairo. Her father was a lawyer who defended political prisoners, some of whom were el-Dawla's own relatives.

El-Dawla studied medicine and surgery at Ain Shams University, graduating in 1978. She went on to obtain a master's degree in psychiatry, followed by a PhD in 1991. El-Dawla worked for a time as a professor of medicine at Ain Shams.

== Activism ==
After observing human rights violations during her time as a student in the 1970s, including friends being detained and tortured, el-Dawla became politically active, becoming a founding member of the New Woman Research Centre, which campaigned against female genital mutilation and violence against women. She also volunteered with the Egyptian Organisation for Human Rights between 1989 and 1994. El-Dawla serves a member of advisory boards for Women's Mental Health Magazine, the European University Centre for Mental Health and Human Rights, and the effects of violence and stalking department of the World Psychiatric Association.

She co-founded the El Nadeem Centre for the Rehabilitation of Victims of Violence and Torture in 1993, a non-governmental organisation providing former detainees practical and medical support. El-Dawla was part of a group of doctors inspired to help after a colleague, Hisham Mubarak, became deaf as a result of being tortured; he additionally had been unable to obtain formal medical reports about his health and condition due to evidencing that he had been tortured. In addition to providing psychiatric support to former detainees, El Nadeem campaigns against the use of torture in Egyptian police stations and prisons, and publishes periodic reports on cases of torture, death and medical negligence among people held in the Egyptian justice system. El Nadeem also supports refugees living in Egypt, as well as victims of domestic abuse. El-Dawla continues to serve as the chairperson of El Nadem as of 2026.

She was a noted critic of Hosni Mubarak, the former President of Egypt, during his regime. She participated in a week-long hunger strike against his government in 1999, and participated in the 2011 Egyptian revolution. During the revolution, el-Dawla documented police and military abuses for the Egyptian Front for the Defence of Protesters.

She was nominated in 2010 to serve as the United Nations Special Rapporteur on Torture, and ultimately placed second to Juan E. Méndez.

She has continued to criticise the Egyptian government since the 2011 revolution for its continued oppression of freedom of expression and association, as well as harassment of human rights activists. In addition, she has criticised its decision to maintain diplomatic relations with Israel following the outbreak of the Gaza war, as well as not opening the Rafah Border Crossing and allowing the Israeli military to access the Philadelphia Corridor. El-Dawla has also condemned the government for arresting activists demonstrating in support of Palestine.

== Persecution ==
Egypt froze El Nadeem's assets in 2016, and seized them in 2017. She challenged the order in court, and in 2021, it was annulled the decision.

She was informed by airport officials that she had been placed under a travel ban in November 2016. The decision was criticised by the World Organisation Against Torture and the International Federation for Human Rights, which stated the ban was in contravention of articles 78 and 93 of the Egyptian constitution, and linking the harassment of el-Dawla as part of Egyptian authorities' ongoing persecution of human rights activists and organisations.

She was summoned on two separate occasions in 2019 and 2020 for interrogation at the prosecution office in Azbakeya; the potential charges or complaint for either interview remain unknown. She announced in February 2026 that she had been summoned to appear for questioning before the Supreme State Security Prosecution at its office in Dokki, without being provided a reason why. On 15 February, following an interrogation, she was charged with "spreading false news in Egypt and abroad with the aim of disrupting public security and peace and causing confusion". El-Dawla was released after paying an 100, 000 EGP bail. It was reported that the charges stemmed from "numerous" criminal complaints made against her, though investigators declined to provide specific information or evidence to el-Dawla or her legal team. El-Dawla's lawyer reported that the interrogation focused on a report published by El Nadeem earlier in the month, based off lists published throughout 2025 of officials implicated in 188 cases of torture and detention, paritcularly at Badr 3 prison.

The charges against her have been widely criticised by human rights groups. The Irish human rights organisation Front Line Defenders condemned the charges, calling on Egyptian authorities to drop the investigation, which it described as "judicial harassment". 18 organisations, including the Egyptian Commission for Rights and Freedoms and the Egyptian Initiative for Personal Rights, published a joint statement expressing their "deep concern" at el-Dawla's summons, calling it a "restriction" and an attempt to "intimidate" her and others into stopping their human rights work, comparing it to recent summons given to other activists including Ahmed Douma and Mahienour El-Massry.
