= George Isaac =

Egyptian politician (1938–2023)

- جورج إسحق
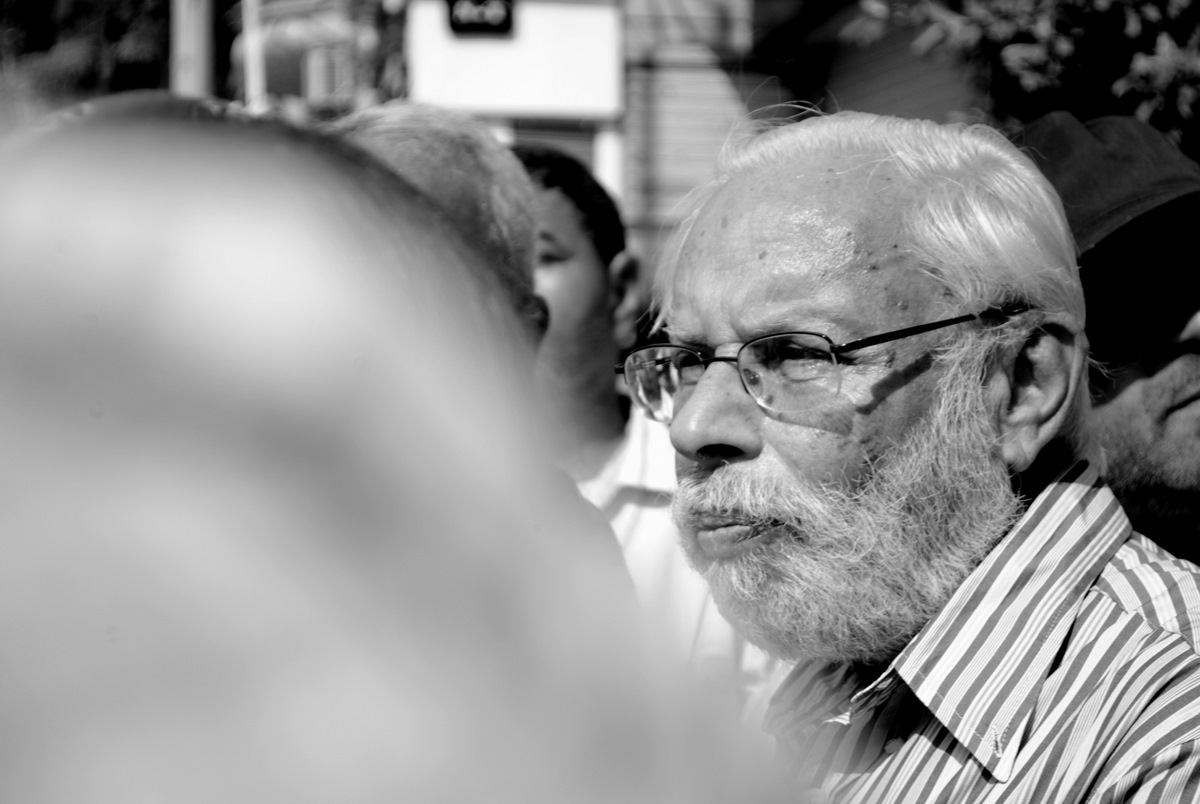
- Isaac in 2011
- Born: George Isaac; 1938; Port Said, Egypt
- Died: 9 June 2023 (aged 85); Cairo, Egypt
- Education: Bachelor's Degree in History
- Alma mater: Cairo University
- Occupations: Politician, School teacher, Headmaster
- Political party: National Bloc Independent; Constitution Party

George Isaac (Arabic: جورج إسحق; 1938 – 9 June 2023) was an Egyptian politician and activist. During the later part of Hosni Mubarak's presidency, he co-founded the grassroots Kefaya opposition movement.

Following the 2011 Egyptian Revolution that toppled Mubarak, Issac became a member of the Constitution Party and a critic of President Mohamed Morsi, elected in 2012. He was a member of the Coptic Catholic Church.

== Early years ==
Born and raised in Port Said, Isaac graduated from Cairo University with a BA in history and began his career as a history teacher, headmaster and later as a consultant. Politically active at a young age, he joined the Fedayeen to oppose the British occupation of Egypt and resisted the invasion of Egypt during the Suez Crisis. He was a member of Egypt's Constitution Party.

== Political activism ==
Isaac was a founding member and first general coordinator of the Kefaya opposition group, the movement organised the first protest against Mubarak rule. Isaac was later a member of the National Association for Change, a grassroots coalition which prior to the 2011 revolution drew its support from across Egypt’s political spectrum. It was a platform for protest against Hosni Mubarak’s presidency; political corruption, and stagnation; "the blurring of the lines between power and wealth; and human rights."

During the 2012 Egyptian protests, Isaac urged President Mohamed Morsi to withdraw his constitutional declaration. On 8 December, after Morsi sought to address some of the protesters' demands, Isaac said that Morsi’s new declaration "does not answer people’s demands", and the work would continue.

Isaac was a member of the National Council for Human Rights.

== Death ==
George Isaac died on 9 June 2023, at the age of 85. Samir Elish, the leader of the Civil Democratic Movement, said: "May God have mercy on our brother George Ishak and forgive him and enter him into his spacious heavens. Our heartfelt condolences to all friends and acquaintances for the loss of a patriotic man and comrade of struggle."
