= Israa Abdel Fattah =

Egyptian activist

Esraa Abdel Fattah
- Born: 1978 (age 47–48); Egypt
- Known for: Egyptian internet activist and blogger.
- Movement: Co-founded the April 6 Youth Movement Egypt in 2008,
- Criminal charges: October 2019 detained without trial on alleged terrorism charges
- Awards: July 2021 Courage Tribute Award from the World Movement for Democracy.

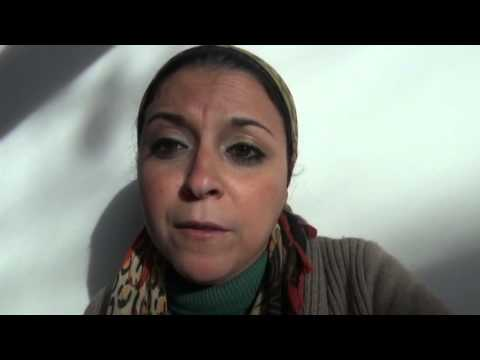
Esraa Abdel Fattah

Esraa Abdel Fattah (born 1978, Arabic: إسراء عبد الفتاح, IPA: [ʔesˈɾɑːʔ ʕæbdelfætˈtæːħ, ˈʔesɾɑ-]; also called Facebook Girl) born 1978 is an Egyptian internet activist and blogger.

Esraa worked as a human resources administrator, when she co-founded the April 6 Youth Movement Egypt in 2008, a group that was made to support the workers in El-Mahalla El-Kubra, an industrial town, who were planning to strike on April 6. This group gradually became a popular political movement.

Since October 2019 she has been detained without trial on alleged terrorism charges. In July 2021 she received a Courage Tribute Award from the World Movement for Democracy. She was released from prison on July 17, 2021.

== 2008 arrest ==
She was arrested by Egyptian security in 2008. She drew the attention of few Egyptian newspapers challenging by this the state's censorship policy, turning her into an overnight symbol for resistance and resilience against corruption and injustice.

After two weeks in prison she was released. She made a brief public statement renouncing political activism for good.

== 2011 Egyptian protest ==
Esraa Abdel Fattah reappeared during the January 2011 nationwide protests in Egypt, that called for the end of Hosni Mubarak's regime. She was active on the internet, and also on the ground, updating Al Jazeera TV with the latest news related to the opposition.

== Post-revolution ==
When the state security buildings were attacked in early March, 2011, in the wake of signs of files there being destroyed, a file for Isra’a was found which contained ten pages of documents detailing three years of wiretaps and hacked e-mail, including some focused on her divorce. "The feeling of violation was indescribable," she said.

Her name was put forward for the 2011 Nobel Peace Prize.

On October 31, 2011, she was named a Woman of the Year by "Glamour"

== Imprisonment under Sisi regime ==
Abdel Fattah worked as reporter and social media coordinator for the news website Tahrir News, which was banned by the Sisi regime. On October 13, 2019 plain-clothes officers arrested Abdel Fattah, allegedly tortured her and she was held in pretrial detention. In August 2020 she was charged with new crimes - membership of a terrorist organization, spreading false news, and committing terrorist crimes - allegedly committed while incarcerated. In July 2021 she received a Courage Tribute Award from the World Movement for Democracy. She was released on July 17, 2021 alongside a number of other prominent journalists and opposition figures, days after US officials voiced fresh concerns after another prominent activist was indicted in Egypt.

== See also ==
- Asmaa Mahfouz
