= Mostafa Mussad =

Egyptian politician

Minister of Higher Education
- In office 2 August 2012 – 16 July 2013
- Prime Minister: Hisham Qandil
- Succeeded by: Hossam Eisa

Personal details
- Party: Freedom and Justice Party
- Education: Cairo University

Mostafa El Said Mussad is the former minister of higher education of Egypt. He was part of the Qandil Cabinet and is a member of the Freedom and Justice Party. He is described as Islamist engineering professor by Ashraf Khaled.

== Education ==
Mussad graduated from Cairo University in 1973.

== Career ==
Mussad is an engineering professor. He worked at Cairo University's faculty of engineering and was the head of the education committee for the Muslim Brotherhood's Freedom and Justice Party. He was a member of the team in charge of Morsi's presidential campaign. And he developed the educational policy for his campaign.

He was appointed minister of higher education as part of the Qandil cabinet on 2 August 2013, and was one of the Freedom and Justice Party members serving in the cabinet. It was his first cabinet post. Mussad's term ended on 16 July 2013. Hossam Eisa replaced him in the post.
