= Hossam Eisa =

Egyptian politician and academic

Deputy Prime Minister and Minister of Higher Education
- In office 16 July 2013 – 1 March 2014
- Prime Minister: Hazem Al Beblawi
- Preceded by: Mostafa Mussad (Minister of Higher Education)
- Succeeded by: Wael El-Degwi (Minister of Higher Education and Scientific Research)

Personal details
- Party: Nasserist Party (formerly); Constitution Party (until March 2013)
- Education: University of Sorbonne

Hossam Eisa is an Egyptian politician and academic. He served as deputy prime minister and minister of higher education of Egypt from July 2013 until 1 March 2014.

== Education ==
Eisa holds a PhD in law from the University of Sorbonne in France.

== Career ==
Eisa was a member of the Nasserist Party. He worked as a law professor and taught at Ain Shams University in Egypt and at the Algerian universities. Following the ouster of former President Hosni Mobarak, he became one of the founders of the Egyptian Initiative for Prevention of Corruption in 2011. During the same period he was the attorney of Asmaa Mahfouz, an Egyptian activist who had organized the 18-day uprising, forcing the ouster of President Mobarak in February 2011.

He cofounded the Constitution Party with Mohamed El Baradei in April 2012. He served as the head of party's steering committee. However, he left the party in March 2013 due to internal conflicts.

On 16 July 2013, Eisa was appointed both deputy prime minister for social justice and minister of higher education in the cabinet led by Prime Minister Hazem Al Beblawi. He succeeded Mostafa Mussad as minister of higher education. Eisa's term as cabinet member ended in February 2014 when the cabinet resigned.

== Views ==
Ahram Online describes Eisa as a Nasserist politician. He holds a leftist political stance. During the Mohammad Morsi era, he was among the major opposition figures and he advocated for the state to play a determining role in leading the economy, criticizing neo-liberal policies of the Qandil government.
