= Boston Film Festival =

Film festival in Massachusetts, US

- Location: Boston, Massachusetts, United States
- Language: International
- Website: bostonfilmfestival.org

Boston Film Festival (BFF) is an annual film festival held in Boston in the U.S. state of Massachusetts. It has been held annually since 1984, usually in early September.

The Boston Film Festival premiered such notable films as The Last Kiss, A Guide to Recognizing Your Saints, Renaissance, Deliver Us From Evil, Jesus Camp, The Ground Truth, The US vs. John Lennon, A Desperate Crossing, Kiss Kiss Bang Bang, Prime, North Country, and How to Start a Revolution.

== Film Excellence Award ==
| Recipient | Year | Age |
|---|---|---|
| Jodie Foster | 1991 | 28 |
| Al Pacino | 1992 | 52 |
| Susan Sarandon | 1992 | 46 |
| Tommy Lee Jones | 1993 | 47 |
| Mercedes Ruehl | 1993 | 45 |
| Harvey Keitel | 1994 | 55 |
| Vanessa Redgrave | 1995 | 58 |
| Gena Rowlands | 1996 | 66 |
| Helena Bonham Carter | 1997 | 31 |
| Holly Hunter | 1998 | 40 |
| Robert Towne | 1998 | 64 |
| Annette Bening | 1999 | 41 |
| Kevin Spacey | 1999 | 39 |
| Ellen Burstyn | 2000 | 67 |
| Jeff Bridges | 2000 | 50 |
| Steve Martin | 2001 | 56 |
| Sissy Spacek | 2001 | 51 |
| William H. Macy | 2002 | 52 |
| Ridley Scott | 2003 | 65 |

== Orson Welles Cinema ==
It was preceded by the earlier Boston Film Festival, held in Cambridge at the Orson Welles Cinema in 1976.

It is often confused with the Boston International Film Festival, which is annually held in Boston as well.
