= April 6 Youth Movement =

Egyptian activist group formed to organize the 2008 nationwide workers' strike

April 6 Youth Movement Haraket Shabab 6 April حركة شباب 6 أبريل
- حركة شباب 6 أبريل
- Founded: 2008
- Founders: Ahmed Maher; Asmaa Mahfouz; Mohammed Adel
- Type: Pressure group Political group
- Purpose: Democracy; Social justice Free and fair elections Civil resistance Secularism
- Region served: Egypt
- Key people: Ahmed Maher; Mohammed Adel; Amr Ali
- Website: 6april.org

The April 6 Youth Movement (Arabic: حركة شباب 6 أبريل) is an Egyptian activist group established in Spring 2008 to support the workers in El-Mahalla El-Kubra, an industrial town, who were planning to strike on 6 April.

Activists called on participants to wear black and stay home on the day of the strike. Bloggers and citizen journalists used Facebook, Twitter, Flickr, blogs and other new media tools to report on the strike, alert their networks about police activity, organize legal protection and draw attention to their efforts.

The New York Times has identified the movement as the political Facebook group in Egypt with the most dynamic debates. As of January 2009, it had 70,000 predominantly young and educated members, most of whom had not been politically active before; their core concerns include free speech, nepotism in government and the country's stagnant economy. Their discussion forum on Facebook features intense and heated discussions, and is constantly updated with new postings.

The April 6 movement is using the same raised fist symbol as the Otpor! movement from Serbia, that helped bring down the regime of Slobodan Milošević and whose nonviolent tactics were later used in Ukraine and Georgia. Mohammed Adel, a leader in the April 6 movement, studied at the Centre for Applied Nonviolent Action and Strategies, an organization founded by former Otpor! members. The movement was banned by an Egyptian court on 28 April 2014. The Constitution Party condemned the verdict, arguing that the charges against the movement were "false" and that the court ruling was an example of state institutions undermining and destroying the rule of law. Hamdeen Sabahi's presidential campaign warned of the "return to a state of suppression and banning." Abdul Ghaffar Shukr, vice president of the National Council for Human Rights, has stated that the council is prepared to stand in solidarity with the April 6 Youth Movement, and will aid the movement if it requests assistance. Human Rights Watch condemned the ruling as "a clear violation of citizens' rights to free association, peaceful assembly, and free expression." The April 6 movement has vowed to defy the ban, as well as attempt to repeal it.

== Founders ==
- Ahmed Maher was a participant in the anti-Mubarak demonstrations in Egypt in 2011.
- Mohammed Adel worked with Kefaya movement since 2005, and one of activist who called for general strike on 6 April 2008, and then started working with Media committee on April 6 Youth Movement, and in 2009 he was the spokesman of movement and political office member.
- Ahmed Douma, a leader of the demonstrations against President Hosni Mubarak, imprisoned since 2013 for organizing unauthorized protests.

== Public activism and arrests ==
Aside from online discussions of national issues, members of the group have organized public rallies to free imprisoned journalists and engaged in protests concerning the 2008–2009 Israel–Gaza conflict. In its official pronouncements, the group stresses that it is not a political party. Ahmed Maher, one of the founders of the group, was arrested by the Egyptian authorities in May 2008 in an attempt to shut it down.

In July 2008, Maher was again arrested, along with 14 other members of the group, and charged with "incitement against the regime". He also claimed that Egyptian state security officers threatened to rape him in custody.

On 6 April 2009, the group was subjected to attacks, suspected to have been orchestrated by the Egyptian government. Several websites supporting the group were hacked simultaneously, and protests in Cairo were confronted by plain clothed Egyptian policemen and numerous arrests. On 2 May 2010, the movement called for demonstrations under the name of the Workers' Revolution, which was aimed at achieving the minimum wage. In August of that year, slogans spread on the walls of the streets against the legacy of former President Hosni Mubarak, Most notably "Egypt is not your father's father".

On 29 January 2011, a leaked diplomatic cable revealed which showed that the United States considered the movement to be "outside (the) mainstream of opposition politicians and activists" and described the goals of the movement for democracy as "unrealistic" yet still supported it in various ways, including pressing "the MFA for the release of April 6 activists". On 31 January 2011, the movement promoted participation of at least a million in a march on 1 February 2011.

On 3 February 2011, the Hisham Mubarak Law Center which was providing meeting space for the April 6 Youth Movement as well as providing medical and legal aid to the protesters was raided by security forces who arrested Amal Sharaf and other members of April 6.

In October 2011, the group launched a "black circle, white circle" political awareness campaign. Aiming to prevent former members of Mubarak's regime from winning seats in the post-revolution parliament, the group compiled a list of candidates with ties to the dissolved National Democratic Party or with histories of corruption, which comprised the "black circle." Meanwhile, in the "white circle," the group listed a set of qualifications and characteristics they hope to see in elected officials.

On 29 March 2013, the Movement organized an extraordinary demonstration in front of the house of the Egyptian Minister of Interior: General Mohamed Ibrahim. The activists carried women's lingerie and a banner describing the Ministry of Interior as the "prostitute of the regime". Three of the movement activists were arrested: Abdel Azim Fahmy (Known by Zizo), Mohamed Mustapha and Mamdouh Hassan ( Known by Abou Adam). Later on a fourth activist was arrested and detained, Sayed Mounir. April 6 Movement called for a "Rage Day" against President Mohamed Mursi on the fifth anniversary of its establishment 6 April 2013.

On 10 May 2013, Ahmed Maher was arrested at Cairo Airport upon his return to Egypt from a conference in the United States with charges of inciting for protests. Maher was released the day after, but the incident was a turning point. On 12 May, the 6 April Youth Movement decided to join the recently launched petitions collection campaign, Tamarod, calling for a vote of no-confidence in the administration of President Mohamed Morsi.

In July 2013, following the military coup against President Morsi, members of 6 April participated in The Third Square, a movement created by liberal, leftist and moderate Islamist activists who reject both Muslim Brotherhood and military rule. Many April 6 members also played founding roles in the Road of the Revolution Front, an organization dedicated to achieving the revolutionary goals of bread, freedom, and social justice.

In 2013, the 6 April movement held internal elections to determine who would succeed Ahmed Maher as the organization's coordinator. The vote resulted in Amr Ali, an accountant from Menufiya who has been involved in managing the group's community and public works, becoming the movement's new coordinator.

== Anti-Protest law campaign & arrest of movement founders ==
The Egyptian interim president Adly Mansour, and regardless of the widespread critics, approved a new law restricting protests on 24 November 2013.

The law was nationally and internationally heavily criticized with the United Nations High Commissioner for Human Rights Navi Pillay urging the Egyptian government to amend it or repeal it. UN Secretary General Ban Ki-moon added his voice to those criticizing the law for leaving the door open to a very restrictive and repressive interpretation and urged the Egyptian authorities to consider amendments to the law "to make sure that any laws passed are in full conformity with international human rights standards". Guy Verhofstadt, President of the Alliance of Liberals and Democrats for Europe Group (ALDE), the third largest group in the European Parliament, criticized the new law

This anti-protest law is against everything the revolution was about. The Egyptian government should withdraw it.

On 26 November, the No Military Trials for Civilians campaign organised a protest at the Shura Council in defiance of the protest law. The protest was violently dispersed by the police, and dozens of well-known activists were arrested. The female activists were beaten and released on a desert road in the middle of the night, while the 24 male detainees remained in custody; most of whom were released on bail a week later.

An arrest warrant was issued against Ahmed Maher on the following day, accusing him of inciting protests. Maher turned himself in and was detained on 30 November 2013.

On 22 December 2013 an Egyptian court sentenced Ahmed Maher, Mohammed Adel, together with another prominent Egyptian activist, Ahmed Douma, to three years in jail and EGP50,000 fine each.

Members of the April 6 movement and activists from other organizations have planned to initiate an open-ended sit-in with the intention of remaining in place until the protest law is repealed and the verdict sentencing Ahmed Maher, Mohamed Adel, and Ahmed Douma to three years in jail and the paymenent of a fine of LE50,000 have been overturned. Due to fears of a crackdown, the sit-in's timing and logistics have been rescheduled.

=== Reactions to the verdict ===
The verdicts were widely criticized nationally and internationally:

The Cairo-based Arab Organization for Human Rights condemned the sentence saying it contradicts the spirit of the 25 January revolution. The Constitution Party has expressed solidarity with the detainees and their families and requested that the interim President Adly Mansour issue a pardon to Ahmed Maher, Mohammed Adel, and Ahmed Douma, as well as to Loay Abdel Rahman, Omar Hussein, Islam Ahmed, and Nasser Ibrahim. The Egyptian Social Democratic Party, the Popular Current, the Bread and Freedom Party, and the Freedom for the Brave campaign have also lent their support to the cause of freedom for the imprisoned activists.

Hamdeen Sabahi has censured the court conviction sentencing Ahmed Maher, Mohamed Adel and Ahmed Douma to three years in prison and a fine of LE50,000 and maintains that Interim President Adly Mansour should issue these and other detained individuals a pardon.

The European Union: "The High Representative is concerned about the guilty verdict, the prison sentences and the financial penalty handed down by a court in Egypt against political activists Ahmed Maher, a founder of the April 6 Movement, Ahmed Douma and Mohammed Adel. These sentences appear to be based on the recently enacted protest law which is widely seen as limiting excessively freedom of expression and assembly. The High Representative expresses the hope that these sentences could be reviewed in an appeals process."

France: "France takes note of the harsh prison sentences handed down in the court of first instance to three human rights activists: Ahmed Maher, Ahmed Douma and Mohamed Adel. The handing down of these sentences follows the arrests carried out by the police – including on the premises of a human rights association –on the basis of the new law on demonstrations adopted on November 24.France shares the concerns expressed by the UN secretary-general and the UN high commissioner for human rights about this law. The sentences handed down yesterday confirm these concerns. France calls for compliance with the commitments undertaken by the Egyptian authorities in the context of the road map and at the international level with respect to public freedoms, notably the freedom of expression and opinion and the freedom to demonstrate peacefully while respecting public security requirements."

Italy: "The Ministry for Foreign Affairs noted the Egyptian courts' conviction of three members of the opposition — Ahmed Maher, founder of the April 6th movement, and Ahmed Douma and Mohamed Adel — on charges associated with the protests. In reference to the Egyptian transition, Italy fully shares the stances taken by the United Nations and the European Union on the importance of respect for freedom of expression and the right to peaceful demonstration. Italy reconfirms its support for an inclusive and sustainable transition in Egypt aimed at the creation of a democratic society based on respect for human rights and fundamental freedoms, and its willingness to engage in dialogue and cooperation to that end."

Norway: ""I am concerned about the yesterday's judgment against three Egyptian human rights activists. It is crucial that the Egyptian authorities respect democratic principles in this critical period prior to the elections and referendum on the constitution," said Minister of Foreign Affairs Børge Brende. The Egyptian authorities have taken action against democracy and human rights activists on several occasions recently. Yesterday, three prominent activists – Ahmed Maher, Ahmed Douma and Mohammed Adel – were sentenced to three years' imprisonment, and last week, employees and volunteers at the Centre for Economic and Social Rights were arrested in connection with a raid."

United Kingdom: "Foreign Office Minister Mark Simmonds expresses concern on the sentencing of three human rights activists in Egypt. Foreign Office Minister Mark Simmonds said: I was deeply concerned to hear about the sentencing to three years in prison of the democracy and human rights activists Ahmed Maher, Ahmed Douma and Mohammed Adel. This represents a serious setback to attempts to return Egypt to the democratic path and undermines the values expressed by Egyptians during the Revolution of January 2011. The UK believes the freedom to protest peacefully is vital in any democracy and calls on Egypt's interim leaders to ensure that they uphold all Egypt's international human rights obligations."

United States: "The United States is deeply concerned about the worsening climate for freedom of assembly and peaceful expression in Egypt. The implementation of Egypt's restrictive demonstrations law has led to an increase in arrests, detentions, and charges against opposition figures, human rights activists and peaceful demonstrators, and sends a chilling message to civil society at large. In particular, we believe that the verdicts issued December 22 do not contribute to an open electoral environment or a transition process that protects the universal rights of all Egyptian citizens, and therefore should be reviewed. We continue to urge the government to fulfill its commitment to implement an inclusive democratic transition, including by permitting an open environment in which Egyptians are free to campaign and vote in favor or against the draft constitution on January 14–15, or abstain from the process entirely."

=== Petition to repeal the protest law ===
The April 6 movement has launched a campaign to annul the Egyptian protest law by a circulating a petition which citizens may sign to indicate approval for law's abolition or redrafting. Leading functionaries from various political factions who have signed the petition include the president of the Constitution Party, Hala Shukrallah, and Mohamed Ghonim, a key member of the Egyptian Social Democratic Party.

=== The split ===
The April 6 Youth Movement Democratic Front (Arabic: حركة شباب 6 أبريل الجبهة الديمقراطية) is an Egyptian activist group established in spring 2011 after the differences in the April 6 Youth Movement, led by Ahmed Maher. Differences in the Movement started to appear in April when leaders of the movement announced they would transform it into a NGO or foundation on its anniversary. TV host and founder, Abd Alrahman Ezz, of 6 April "Democratic Front", told Ahram Online that the decision was taken without consultation. "It was taken with no respect for democracy, for the majority," Ezz says. The lack of internal democracy is the main reason why some left the mainstream movement, led by Ahmed Maher, forming the Democratic Front, Ezz says most of the old members joined the Democratic Front. On 5 August, a group of 6 April Youth Movement members in Alexandria announced that they had joined the Democratic Front, leaving the Ahmed Maher front due to what they considered discrimination in decision-making processes.

The split is not limited to Cairo and Alexandria but also seems to have been reproduced itself across the country. On 6 August, a group of April 6 Movement members in Kafr El-Sheikh governor announced that they joined the Democratic Front, leaving the Ahmed Maher Front. The same happened in Behaira and Port Said.

=== The split leaders ===
- Tarek Alkholy was a participant in the anti-Morsi demonstrations in Egypt in 2013.
- Abd Alrahman Ezz escaped abroad after coup.
- Shiref Alroby was jailed for four years in 2016 in a military jail.
- Mohamed Tarek is founding member currently jailed for his witness of the massacre of the Rabeaa al Adawiya. He is the main witness for the organization Human Rights Watch and one of the founders of the April 6 Movement Democratic Front in Alexandria.
- Yasser Shams Aldden is the founder of The April 6 Movement Democratic Front in Alexandria as well as a blogger and journalist who escaped abroad after the Military coup.
- Basma Fawzi is one of the founders of the April 6 movement Democratic Front.

== See also ==
- Saad Eddin Ibrahim
- Ayman Nour – an Egyptian opposition leader, founder of the Tomorrow Party and head of the Ghad El-Thawra Party
- Civil resistance
- Nonviolent resistance
- Hosni Mubarak
- Kefaya
- National Association for Change
- Hisham Mubarak Law Center
- Egyptian Revolution of 2011
- Misr Spinning and Weaving Company
