= Peace and Collaborative Development Network =

Online communication network founded in 2007

Peace and Collaborative Development Network (PCDN) is an online network, used to foster connections, share information and inspire the work of those in social change. It was founded by Craig Zelizer, a professor at Georgetown University in Washington, D.C., in 2007. The network currently has 35,000 members from over 180 countries and territories.

== History and Purpose ==
Founded in 2007, PCDN originally started as a platform to connect people working in international development and peacebuilding. In 2015, it launched PCDN 3.0 and expanded to cover the broader social changemaking fields which includes peacebuilding, international development, social entrepreneurship, social impact, gender mainstreaming and many other related areas. The 3.0 platform provides additional ways for members to receive information, locate fellow members, search for job, find relevant opportunities and provide more space for engagement.

PCDN is a membership driven platform. Membership can be individual or organizational. As a member, users can create a profile, contribute to discussions, create blog posts, chat with fellow members, or post information about jobs, research, questions, conferences and events. There are also a large number of guides available to members to help members be successful in their careers. Guides include topics such as careers, funding, research, social media/tech, and practice.

PCDN has office space at Washington, DC’s 1776, a start-up incubator.

The network attracts more than 100,000 unique visitors each month and over 300,000 website hits a month.
