= Ahmed Harara =

Egyptian political activist (born 1980)

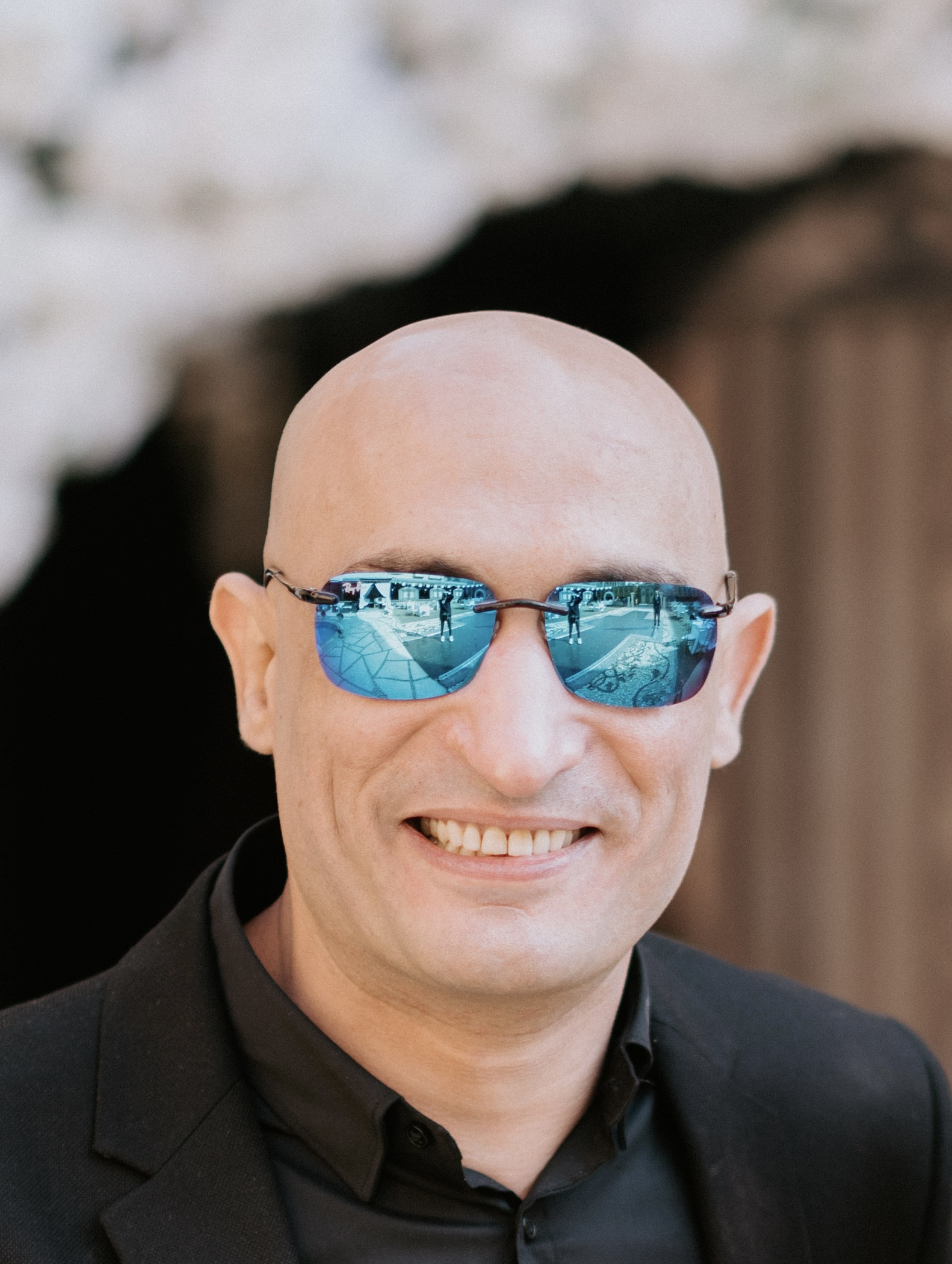
A recent photo

Ahmed Hararah (Egyptian Arabic: "أحمد محمد علي البلاسي "حرارة, born February 11, 1980) is an Egyptian political activist who was blinded in both eyes in separate protesting incidents during the 2011 Egyptian Revolution. He lost his first eye to Police gunshots on 28 January (also known as the Friday of Wrath), and his second eye also to police gunshots during the events of Mohamed Mahmoud on 19 November of the same year. The nickname "Hararah" means heat and zeal. Hararah continued his activism for several years following the revolution. Among his most famous actions was forming the polity party Dostor, along with other prominent figures including Dr. Mohamed El-Baradie. Hararah was also a prominent figure in modifying the articles in the Egyptian Constitution that guarantee the rights of disabled people. He used his fame to advocate for many crucial political and human rights issues at the time. After losing his career as a dentist, Hararah decided to pursue his studies in a different field and has already obtained a master's degree in Social Policy from LSE University in London and is currently pursuing his second master's degree in Middle East Issues with the AUC University in Cairo. He also works as a part-time researcher. Hararah is married and currently lives in Cairo.

== About ==
The former dentist became a symbol of the 25 January Revolution in which protestors called for the removal of President Hosni Mubarak. He initially decided to join the Revolution to protest against police brutality against the poor and the weak in Egypt and continued to call for the slogans of the Revolution 'bread, freedom, and social justice'. Hararah was named the Person of the Year 2011 in the Times Magazine and interviewed widely during the years following the Revolution.

== Injuries ==
Hararah sustained injuries that left him blind.

=== Right eye ===
On January 28, 2011, known as the Friday of Wrath, protesters clashed with police on the Qasr El Nile Bridge. Hararah believed it marked the day when all of Egypt united in their protest. Hararah was shot in the face with a shotgun and remained in a coma for three days before regaining consciousness in the hospital. The gunshot's pellets caused 64 lacerations to his head, resulting in complete burning of his right eye's retina, along with six injuries to his neck and four to his lungs. None of the pellets have been removed.

=== Left eye ===
On November 19, 2011, Hararah was shot a second time while demonstrating on Mohamed Mahmoud St. near Tahrir Square, but this shotgun was loaded with one large pellet, which hit him directly in the left eye, resulting in total blindness.
