= Asmaa Mahfouz =

Egyptian activist (born 1985)

- أسماء محفوظ
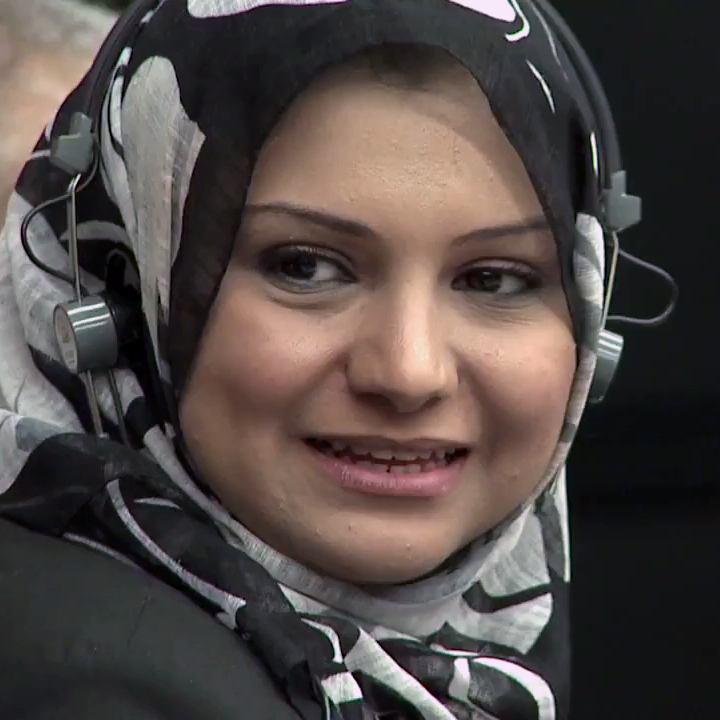
- Mahfouz in 2011
- Born: 1 February 1985 (age 41); Cairo, Egypt
- Education: Cairo University
- Known for: 2011 Egyptian revolution

Asmaa Mahfouz (Egyptian Arabic: أسماء محفوظ, pronounced [ʔæsˈmæːʔ mɑħˈfuːz, ˈʔæsmæ-], born 1 February 1985) is an Egyptian activist and one of the founders of the April 6 Youth Movement. She has been credited by journalist Mona Eltahawy and others with helping to spark a mass uprising through her video blog posted one week before the start of the 2011 Egyptian revolution. She is a prominent member of Egypt's Coalition of the Youth of the Revolution and one of the leaders of the Egyptian revolution.

In 2011 she was one of five recipients of the "Sakharov Prize for Freedom of Thought", awarded for contributions to "historic changes in the Arab world". The other joint recipients were Ahmed al-Senussi, Razan Zaitouneh, Ali Farzat, and Mohamed Bouazizi of the Arab Spring.

Arabian Business placed Mahfouz at #381 on its list of the World's 500 Most Influential Arabs.

== Overview ==
Born on 1 February 1985 in Egypt, Asmaa graduated from Cairo University with a BA in Business Administration. She later joined several other young Egyptians in founding the April 6 Youth Movement. She currently works for a computer company.

== Background ==
Hosni Mubarak had ruled Egypt since 1981, gaining increasing powers over the years and eliminating individual freedoms under an emergency law allowing the police to detain activists without charge. Corruption increased, and as it did, inequality between the rich and the poor and inadequate social services resulted in widespread discontent. Those working in the textile industry in El Mahalla El Kubra became increasingly dissatisfied with their working conditions and low salaries, driving them to plan a strike in April 2008. Young activists in what became known at the April 6 Youth Movement supported the textile workers, encouraging wider action on Facebook and other social networks. Like the independent journalists, many of them had been harassed and detained by the police, but they continued to support the strikers. Asmaa Mahfouz was one of those who joined them, learning how to make effective use of networking as a means of organising protests.

== January 2011 uprising in Egypt ==
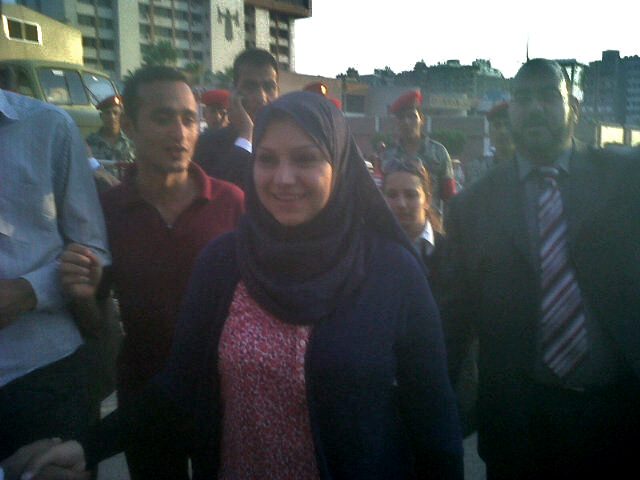
Mahfouz circa 2011

Mahfouz has been credited with having sparked the protests that began the uprising in January 2011 in Cairo. In a video blog posted on Facebook on 18 January, she called on Egyptians to demand their human rights and to voice their disapproval of the regime of Hosni Mubarak. The video was uploaded to YouTube and, within days, went "viral". Addressing the Egyptian nation, she encouraged protesters to gather in Tahrir Square, explaining: "Four Egyptians have set themselves on fire to protest humiliation and hunger and poverty and degradation they had to live with for 30 years... Today, one of these four has died." She then called on her compatriots to "have some shame", arousing them to action. "Instead of setting ourselves on fire, let us do something positive... Sitting at home and just following us on the news or on Facebook leads to our humiliation."

In an interview with al-Mihwar TV, she recalled that a week before 25 January, she had posted a video on Facebook announcing that she would be going to Tahrir Square to protest. Mahfouz said that four other young Egyptians joined her and that the internal security services quickly surrounded and moved the group away from the square.

Following this, she posted another video announcing her intention to go to the square again on 25 January, a national holiday honouring police who had died in a confrontation with British forces. In this video, she challenged Egyptians to take to the street, saying,

If you think yourself a man, come with me on 25 January. Whoever says women shouldn't go to protests because they will get beaten, let him have some honour and manhood and come with me on 25 January. Whoever says it is not worth it because there will only be a handful of people, I want to tell him, 'You are the reason behind this, and you are a traitor, just like the president or any security cop who beats us in the streets.'

Later in 2011, Mahfouz was arrested on charges of defaming the Egyptian military rulers for calling them a "council of dogs". She was referred to a military court, prompting activists, as well as presidential hopefuls such as Mohamed El Baradei and Ayman Nour to protest her being charged in a military court. Mahfouz was released on bail in the amount of E£20,000 (equivalent to approximately US$3,350), and after that the Supreme Council of Armed Forces renounced the charges against Asmaa as well as another activist, Loay Nagaty. Her attorney was Hossam Eisa.

In October 2011 it was announced that, together with four other Arabs, Mahfouz would be awarded the European Parliament's Sakharov Prize in recognition of her drive for freedom and human rights. It was explained that she had helped to motivate Egyptians to demand their rights on Tahrir Square by means of videos on YouTube and posts on Facebook and Twitter. Mahfouz was one of only two award winners who attended the presentation ceremony at the European Parliament in Strasbourg on 14 December 2011.

== Support of Occupy Wall Street ==
On 23 October 2011 Mahfouz held a teach-in at Liberty Plaza, in a show of support for the Occupy Wall Street movement. When asked why she came to the OWS protest, she replied, "Many of U.S. residents were in solidarity with us. So, we have to keep going all over the world, because another world is possible for all of us."

== Banned from travelling abroad ==
In October 2014 Mahfouz was held for three hours at Cairo International Airport as she was preparing to leave for Bangkok. The authorities wanted to check to see whether she faced lawsuits. One case involving an attack on a supporter of Hosni Mubarak appeared to be open, but it was shown that she had been acquitted of the crime.

== See also ==
Political activists

- Ahmed Maher
- Israa Abdel Fattah
- Malalai Anaa
- Wael Ghonim
- Civil resistance
- Nonviolent resistance
- List of women who sparked a revolution
