= Ahmed Maher (youth leader) =

Egyptian engineer & activist (1980-)

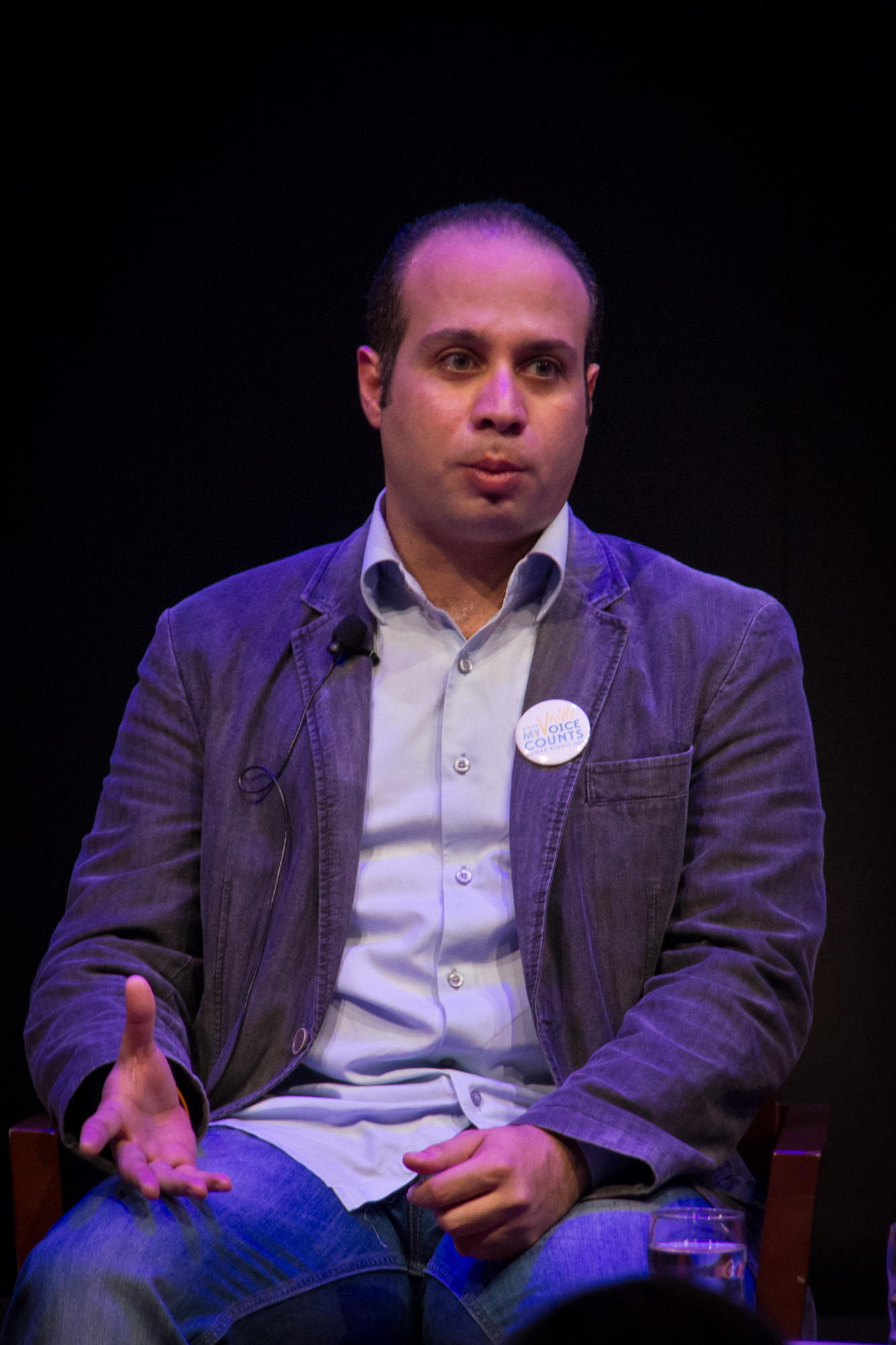
Maher, 2012

Ahmed Maher (Arabic: أحمد ماهر pronounced [ˈ(ʔ)æħmæd ˈmæːheɾ]; born 2 December 1980 in Alexandria, Egypt) is one of the co-founders of the April 6 Youth Movement, and a prominent participant in the Egyptian revolution of 2011 demonstrations in Egypt in 2011. He is a civil engineer who works for a construction firm in New Cairo.

Along with Asmaa Mahfouz, he founded the April 6 Youth Movement in Spring 2008. Maher attempted to organize several demonstrations after April 2008. However, his efforts were hindered both by interference from Egyptian security forces and internal divisions within the 6 April movement. In June 2010, Maher helped organize a protest against the killing, by Egyptian police, of Khaled Said, a young resident of Alexandria. Maher has expressed support for the potential bid of Mohamed ElBaradei for the Egyptian presidency.

He appeared in the 2011 BAFTA award-winning film, How to Start a Revolution.

Maher was detained on 29 November 2013 for holding a demonstration against a new Egyptian protest law. On 22 December 2013, together with other opposition leaders Ahmed Douma and Mohammed Adel, Maher was sentenced to three years in prison as a punishment for protests against recent steps by the Egyptian military government. Maher was expected to appeal to further judgment. The international community, including the U.S. State Department and the Ministry of Foreign Affairs of France, criticized the court’s decision in the context of human rights in Egypt. In March 2014 Maher's lawyer complained that Maher, Douma and Adel were beaten by courthouse guards before an appeal hearing. Hamdeen Sabahi has censured the court conviction sentencing Ahmed Maher, Mohamed Adel and Ahmed Douma to three years in prison and a fine of LE50,000 and maintains that Interim President Adly Mansour should issue these and other detained individuals a pardon. The Constitution Party has expressed solidarity with the detainees and their families and requested that the interim President Adly Mansour issue a pardon to Ahmed Maher, Mohammed Adel, and Ahmed Douma, as well as to Loay Abdel Rahman, Omar Hussein, Islam Ahmed, and Nasser Ibrahim.

In 2014 he wrote an article for The Washington Post titled "The U.S. is supporting oppression in Egypt".

On 4 January 2017, he was freed that evening after completing his 3 years jail term. His lawyers state that provisory freedom was given their client and that he could be confined at the police station overnight at the discretion of authorities.
