= Kefaya =

Egyptian advocacy organization founded in 2004

Kefaya كفاية
- الحركة المصرية من أجل التغيير
- Founded: 2004
- Type: Pressure group Political group
- Purpose: Liberal democracy Social justice Free and fair election
- Region served: Egypt
- Key people: Abdelgelil Mostafa, George Isaac
- Website: Kefaya Website

Kefaya (Egyptian Arabic: كفاية kefāya, IPA: [keˈfæːjæ], "enough") is the unofficial moniker of the Egyptian Movement for Change (Arabic: الحركة المصرية من أجل التغيير el-Haraka el-Masreyya men agl el-Taghyeer), a grassroots coalition which prior to the 2011 revolution drew its support from across Egypt's political spectrum. It was a platform for protest against Hosni Mubarak's presidency and the possibility he might seek to transfer power directly to his son Gamal; political corruption and stagnation; "the blurring of the lines between power and wealth; and the regime's cruelty, coercion and disregard for human rights."

While it first came to public attention in the summer of 2004, and achieved a much greater profile during the 2005 constitutional referendum and presidential election campaigns, it subsequently lost momentum, suffering from internal dissent, leadership change, and a more general frustration at the apparent inability of Egypt's political opposition to force the pace of reform.

== Origins ==
While Kefaya first emerged in 2004, its origins can be found in earlier strands of political protest, beginning with the solidarity committees that spread throughout Egypt following the start of the Second Intifada in October 2000. The pro-Intifada demonstrations were particularly notable as they involved a new generation of previously non-politicised youth and, as a direct consequence, resulted in a revival of Egyptian street politics.

Following the US-led invasion of Iraq in March 2003, these protesters formed the backbone of Egypt's highly vocal anti-war movement, and their protests in turn developed into the first public demonstrations against President Mubarak since he had taken office. The anti-war protest of 20 March 2003 – from which the anti-war movement 20 March derived its name – was one of the biggest spontaneous demonstrations in Egypt's history.

The evolution of this protest movement into Kefaya occurred during the summer of 2004. Speculation, fuelled by state-controlled media, had been mounting that major changes in top-level political personnel were to be announced. The much-anticipated cabinet reshuffle in July resulted in only cosmetic changes, however, and saw the installation of a number of supporters of the President's son, Gamal Mubarak, in important government posts.

Fearing a hereditary transfer of power similar to that which had occurred in Syria, opposition activists and intellectuals were galvanised into action. In August, a petition was circulated which demanded fundamental constitutional and economic reforms, but most importantly direct presidential elections with competing candidates. The 300 signatories of what became Kefaya's founding declaration called for "democracy and reform to take root in Egypt." Then in October 2004, Tarek El-Bishry, one of Egypt's most respected judges, presented what soon came to be regarded as the movement's first manifesto in which he exhorted his fellow citizens to "withdraw their long-abused consent to be governed" – in effect, a call for civil disobedience.

Kefaya's first rally, held on 12 December, was an historic event, being the first occasion a protest had been organised solely to demand that the President step down. Surrounded by riot police, between 500 and 1,000 activists gathered on the steps of the High Court in Cairo. They "remained mostly silent and taped over their mouths a large yellow sticker emblazoned with 'Kefaya'."

== Support-base ==
Described as a "loose knit umbrella of diverse political trends," Kefaya represents a "new style" of opposition in Egypt, with parallels to Ukraine's Orange Revolution and Poland's Solidarity movement. It draws its support from a cosmopolitan range of sources including Nasserists, Islamists, Liberals, Marxists, Secularists etc., some of which have deep-rooted ideological differences, and have even clashed in the past. Activists frequently stress that it is not a political party aiming to achieve power, but a "national coalition movement" united by the common goal of seeking an end to President Mubarak's rule.

Abdel-Halim Qandil, the editor of the Nasserist newspaper Al-Arabi who was spokesman for the movement until the beginning of 2007, emphasised that the use of the word "Kefaya" was designed to connect with the general public: "Our movement targets Egyptians. We want them to put away their fears, and demand their political and economic rights." Another member, Dr Mohamed Al-Saed Idris, an academic, called it "a national cry against the status quo."

== Key events ==
Kefaya came of age in 2005, a year which saw two events of great significance in Egyptian politics. The first was a referendum on 25 May to approve changes to the constitution that would allow the first ever direct, multi-candidate elections for the presidency. The second was the presidential election itself, held on 7 September.

=== Constitutional amendments ===
Kefaya had continued its campaign for political reform since its December demonstration, attracting increasing attention from the government. A rally planned for 18 January was banned, while in the same month political scientist and leading activist Mohamed El-Sayed Said, was removed from a panel discussion at Cairo's Book Fair.

Then on 26 February 2005, President Mubarak caused consternation when he announced a proposal to amend Article 76 of the Constitution to enable multiple candidates to contest presidential elections directly for the first time. Under the old system, the election process was indirect: the candidate was nominated and confirmed by the People's Assembly (Majlis al-Sha'b), controlled by the National Democratic Party (NDP), before being approved in a nationwide "yes" or "no" referendum.

The immediate repercussion to this announcement was the decision by US Secretary of State Condoleezza Rice to cancel a proposed visit to the country in protest at the arrest and imprisonment of opposition politician Ayman Nour, leader of the al-Ghad (Tomorrow) Party. More generally, American President George W. Bush had been putting pressure on key regional allies, especially Egypt and Saudi Arabia, to introduce some form of electoral reform as part of efforts to spread democracy – the so-called "forward strategy for freedom." The Washington Post described President Mubarak's plans as "an act of minimalism intended to deflect domestic and international pressure." Kefaya immediately denounced the proposals as "theatrics" and a "fake reform" designed merely as a "reformulation of the dictatorship".

The timing of the President's announcement was significant, coming only a few weeks after the close of the annual voter registration period (1 November to 31 January) specified under Article 5 of Egypt's constitution. When the specifics of the constitutional amendment were presented by lawmakers, the opposition's fears seemed justified. Under the new rules, each candidate would require the support of at least 250 elected officials from national or local bodies. As these were controlled by the NDP, it would be virtually impossible for signatures to be collected. In addition, political parties that wished to put their candidates on the ballot would need to have been licensed for a minimum of 5 years and have at least 5% of seats in the lower and upper house. This move seemed designed to place even greater pressure on established opposition parties, in particular the already-proscribed Muslim Brotherhood.

The opposition were scathing in their criticism of the NDP. Hussein Abderazzek of the left-wing Tagammu party declared: "The NDP will not only choose its own candidate but also his competitors," while Kefaya accused the party of "aborting people's hopes for freedom and democracy."

=== The referendum campaign ===
The run-up to the referendum saw popular demands for reform "skyrocket." Kefaya held regular protests, calling for the "cancellation of the state of emergency law and all special laws that restrict freedoms" (ilgha'halat al-tawari'wa kafat al-qawanin al-istithna 'iyya al-muqayyada lil-hurriyat). In addition, they attacked the government for its record on social welfare, job creation and education. In April, simultaneous demonstrations were planned in 13 cities under a banner of "No Constitution Without Freedom".

Kefaya's activities served as a catalyst for other opposition groups. Egypt's largest opposition party, the Muslim Brotherhood, held its own demonstrations calling for political reform, while university professors held a silent protest on 19 April calling for an end to state control of campuses. The previous month Misr Digital, the country's first independent digital newspaper, was launched quickly becoming the main source of information on Kefaya's activities.

Egypt's judiciary, regarded as having almost replaced the opposition in the past, put additional pressure on the government over the issue of the domestic monitoring of elections. At a meeting on 15 April of the Alexandria Judges Club, 1,200 judges threatened to withdraw their supervision of presidential and parliamentary elections unless they were guaranteed independence and control of all stages of elections.

Throughout this period, while police and security forces continued to harass Kefaya and other opposition activists, there was no full-scale crackdown. In effect, a stand-off had developed: while the opposition was not strong enough to topple the government, the government was equally unable to stamp-out the opposition, at least partly in fear of the international outcry that would follow. Egyptians described the situation as "political congestion".

=== 25 May 2005 ===
On 25 May, the day of the referendum, demonstrations organised by Kefaya in front of the Press Syndicate headquarters and Sa'd Zaghlul Shrine in Cairo were attacked by Mubarak supporters and plain-clothes policemen, whilst riot police looked on. A reporter gave an eyewitness account of what happened in front of the press building:

"The steps were full of Kefaya people and I was on the edge of the crowd. There was a cordon of security and riot policemen on the street. I saw a group of NDP people come down the streets – they had Mubarak posters – and there were at least 20 riot police walking with them, looking like they were protecting them. The police at the bottom of the steps opened the cordon to let the NDP gang through to the demonstrators. The next thing I knew a gang of about 20 or 30 NDP guys came at us from the left."

Amongst the victims of the brutality were two women who were beaten and sexually molested. The opposition were unified in their condemnation and demanded the resignation of the interior minister, Habib al-'Adli. In addition, Kefaya held protests every Wednesday for the rest of the summer.

Despite these incidents, there was no serious violence on voting day, which George Ishak, Kefaya's co-ordinator at the time, attributed to international attention on Egypt: "There are 1,800 foreign correspondents watching the elections; do you think the regime would should show its hideous face to the world? They behaved the way they did because of the huge media presence."

The referendum approved the proposed constitutional amendments, but Egyptian judges challenged a government turnout figure of 52%, saying it was closer to 5%.

=== The presidential election ===
Despite the setback of the constitutional referendum, Kefaya sought to maintain the pressure on the government ahead of the presidential poll on 7 September. On 8 June, 2,000 people representing a cross-section of the Egyptian opposition took part in a candle-lit vigil in front of the mausoleum of Saad Zaghoul, one of Egypt's national heroes. It was described as "the most organised and impressive demonstration by the reform movement to date."

Throughout the summer, inspired by Kefaya's example, a series of opposition groups sprang up, all seeking to expand freedoms in specific areas of society. They included Journalists for Change, Doctors for Change, Workers for Change and Youth for Change, which had been founded on the eve of the referendum and became Kefaya's unofficial youth arm.

However, the government was emboldened by its May success, and increased its pressure on Kefaya and the other opposition parties. At a rally held in Cairo on 30 July to protest against President Mubarak's intention to seek a fifth term, 200 activists were attacked by uniformed and plain clothed police wielding truncheons. The decision to do this was described by Human Rights Watch as "not just to prevent a demonstration, but also to physically punish those daring to protest President Mubarak's candidacy." The tactics seemed to have an effect when Kefaya was forced to abandon its plan of inviting several prominent figures to run against the President when no names were forthcoming. Instead, it adopted a strategy of boycotting the elections. One of Kefaya's founding members, Hany Anan, declared:

"We are showing Egyptians that we can challenge the ruler, we can tell him we don't want you, that's enough, you go, and we can do this in public and still go back to our homes, maybe with some wounds or some bruises, but we still go home."

Although ten candidates stood for the presidency, the election results came as little surprise. President Mubarak won with 88.6% of the vote. However, of 32 million eligible voters, only seven million cast their ballot, meaning just six million had voted to re-elect the President for a further six years. Most of the defeated candidates challenged these results on the grounds of fraud and other irregularities.

Following the elections, it was predicted in some quarters that Kefaya would disappear from the political scene. In response to this, a huge rally was organised in Cairo to coincide with the President's swearing-in ceremony on 27 September which organisers claimed was attended by over 5,000 people. They carried banners and chanted slogans attacking the President and his regime, including "6 millions voted yes, 70 millions say no." The rally culminated in a mass oath by Kefaya members, promising to continue their opposition to the President and his plans to pass power to his son.

In the autumn, Kefaya joined a group of other opposition parties to form the National Front for Change to fight parliamentary elections that took place between November and December. The joint effort resulted in only 12 seats, however. While the NDP dominated Assembly with 388 seats, the big opposition winners were the Muslim Brotherhood whose candidates, running as independents because of the ban on the party, won 88 seats. Talking about the coalition's disappointing showing, Kefaya spokesman Abdel-Halim Qandil said "it will take time and effort for the public to believe in its effectiveness."

== Criticism ==
Despite its importance in becoming a "model of dissent", Kefaya has been criticised on a number of levels. It promised both mass "civil disobedience" and a strong opposition network to press the regime, neither of which have materialised. Moreover, in the aftermath of the 2005 presidential elections, the International Crisis Group stated: "Kefaya has remained essentially a protest movement, targeting Mubarak personally and articulating a bitter rejection of the status quo rather than a constructive vision of how it might be transformed."

It has also been criticised for failing to reach beyond "an exclusive, Cairo-based intellectual crowd," offering a "lofty discourse on human rights and democracy" but no practical solutions to the problems Egyptians face on a daily basis, such as poverty, unemployment, poor access to education and public services, etc. Thus, according to Abdel Fattah, an academic at Cairo University, Kefaya "are not effective among the masses and they will not reach the point where we see millions of Egyptians take to the streets … instead of slogans I want practical solutions to problems." Unless they can broaden their base of support into key urban and rural areas, they may indeed remain "a group of intellectuals screaming and shouting in political forums and magazines."

== Future prospects ==
After the high-profile campaigns of 2005, Kefaya has found itself in the political doldrums. Its challenge became how to operate in what had apparently become a largely "apolitical society". A culture of fear remained among ordinary Egyptian people as a result of 53 years of bans on protests, along with crackdowns on and detentions of opposition activists. Mohammed El-Sayed Said described Kefaya's problem thus: "Ordinary Egyptians want democracy but will not fight for it."

Moreover, recently Kefaya has been described as suffering from an "identity crisis". There have been disputes over tactics between the movement and Youth for Change, particularly over what have been termed the latter's "vigilante street tactics." Then, at the end of 2006, a more serious split occurred after an anonymous article was posted on Kefaya's website apparently supporting an anti-veil stance advocated by Farouk Hosni, the Minister of Culture. Although the article was subsequently removed, seven key figures, all pro-Islamist, announced their intention to quit the movement. One, Magdi Ahmed Hussein, declared that Kefaya had "failed to find the middle ground between the Islamists and liberals…"

The movement's co-ordinator since 2004, George Ishak, stepped down in January 2007 to be replaced by Abdel-Wahab El-Messiri, a renowned anti-Zionist scholar and former member of both the Egyptian Communist Party and Muslim Brotherhood. He faces the difficult task of renewing the movement following further constitutional changes approved by a referendum in March 2007. The changes, which make it even harder for political parties to operate and extend the state's security powers, are described by Amnesty International as the "greatest erosion of human rights" since the introduction of emergency powers in 1981.

Having successfully broken the taboo on directly criticising and challenging the President, it is unsure whether unity within the movement can be maintained long enough for it to broaden its appeal beyond its urban roots and become a popular movement.

At the time of the 2011 Egyptian protests the movement joined the protests that had been initiated by younger internet-savvy agitators via Facebook, and were described by international media interviewers as the 'opposition'.

== See also ==
- Saad Eddin Ibrahim
- Asmaa Mahfouz
- April 6 Youth Movement
- New Wafd Party
- Nonviolent resistance
- Wafd Party
