= Ettehadiya case =

The Ettehadiya case is a controversial legal case in Egypt where thousands of protesters went down to the Ittihadiya Palace, the Presidential offices in Cairo, asking for the repeal of the newly issued protest law as part of the international day for the solidarity with the Egyptian detainees on 21 June 2014. The march headed for the Heliopolis presidential Palace was demanding the repeal of the protest law and the release of prisoners of conscience - including prominent human rights activist Alaa Abd El-Fattah - was attacked by security forces using teargas and at least 30 activists were arrested among them award winning human rights defender Yara Sallam, young activist and filmmaker Sanaa Seif, and contemporary art dancer Mohamed Anwar Masoud Moftah (known as Anno).

== The march and detainees ==
Acting president Adly Mansour signed a new Egyptian protest law on November 24, 2013 (Act 107, Year 2014). The law, passed by decree in the absence of any democratically elected authority in the country, gives the government sweeping powers to approve or ban any demonstration. It mandates prison terms of 2–5 years for protesters “calling for disrupting public interests.” The law was quickly used to imprison prominent dissidents, including Alaa Abd El-Fattah and human rights lawyer Mahienour El-Massry, as well as many other peaceful anti-government protesters.

Egyptian activists called for an international day of solidarity in opposition to the protest law, for June 21, 2014. On that day, a demonstration numbering at least several hundred people gathered in the Heliopolis neighborhood of Cairo and moved toward the presidential palace. Security forces fired tear gas and arrested 30 or more demonstrators, a few of the detainees later released from jail told local human rights organizations that "a number of the arrested protesters were beaten and threatened to be charged with belonging to the banned Muslim Brotherhood" or the revolutionary April 6 Youth Movement. 24 protesters were arrested (including one infant who tried separately) and being held at Heliopolis police station including Seven women and 17 men:

- Yara Sallam
- Sanaa Seif
- Hanan Mustafa Mohamed
- Salwa Mihriz
- Samar Ibrahim
- Nahid Sherif (known as Nahid Bebo)
- Fikreya Mohamed.
- Ibrahim Ahmed EL said
- Ahmed Samir Mahmoud Mohamed (known as Abo Samra)
- Mohamed Ahmed Youssef Saad (known as Meza)
- Islam Tawfeek Mohamed (known as Gevara)
- Omar Ahmed Mohamed Mahmoud Moussa
- Ahmed Mohamed Abd El Hamed Oraby
- Islam Mohamed Abd El Hamed Oraby
- Moataz Mohamed Mansour
- Karam Mostafa Yasin Helmy (known as Ortiga)
- Mohamed El Beyally
- Mostafa Mohamed Ibrahim
- Basam Mohamed Ali El Saied
- Yaser Saied Fadl El Qot (known as Yaser El Qot)
- Mohamed Anwar Masoud Moftah (known as Anno)
- Mohamed El saed Mohamed El Araby
- Mahmoud Hesham Hussein Abd El Aziz
- Mo'men Mohamed Radwan.

== Procedures ==
22 June 2014: The Masr el-Gedeida’s (Heliopolis) prosecution office issued an order to extend their detention until 23 June 2014 pending further investigation. The human rights defenders have been charged with the following:

1. Participating in an unauthorized demonstration whose aim was to stop the implementation of the law and influence the effectiveness of the public authorities during the carrying out of their work. The possession of safeguards and tools that could cause death if they had been used as weapons
2. Organizing a demonstration without prior notice as stipulated by the law and the participation in a demonstration that breached and threatened public security and the interests of citizens and disrupted transportation and transgressed public and private property
3. The possession of incendiary materials and fireworks during the participation in the demonstration
4. The use of force and violence to terrorize and intimidate citizens
5. The deliberate destruction of public property
6. The deliberate destruction of property owned by the aggrieved party as proven through investigations
7. The possession of fireworks without a license
8. The possession of tools used to assault persons without a legal justification.

24 June 2014: police forces moved the women detainees from the station to Qanatir Prison and the men to Tora Prison a high-security complex notorious for holding political prisoners, just one day before the next prosecution decision.

25 June 2014: the Heliopolis Public Prosecution transferred the case of the 23 detained human rights defenders to the Heliopolis Misdemeanor Court and the first court session held on 29 June 2014.

29 June 2014: the hearing of the case has been moved from Heliopolis Misdemeanor Court to Tora Police Institute (Maahad Omna' El Shorta), and the court decided to postpone the case to 13 September 2014. However, lawyers' request for the provisional release of the defendants was rejected.

In July 2014, Egypt's government-affiliated National Council for Human Rights (NCHR) sent investigators to El-Qanater Prison to interview women detainees in the case about their treatment. The women activists declined to meet with the visitors, and delegated Yara Sallam and Salwa Mehrez to inform them "that if they want to know the reality of the situation in prison, they should be meeting other detainees who are in much worse condition and experience more abuse."

28 August 2014: activist Sanaa Seif (20 years) has joined a growing number of political prisoners on hunger strike from behind bars to protest their conditions in detention after being allowed to attend her father’s - renowned human rights lawyer Ahmed Seif al-Islam - funeral who died on August 27.

29 August 2014: Mohamed Ahmed Youssef Saad (known as Meza) sent a message from the Tora prison to announce joining the hunger strike.

11 September 2014: Ms. Fikreya Mohammed began her hunger strike, and latest news is that she has had to suspend her hunger strike.

13 September 2014: the court decided to renew the detention and adjourned the trial to 11 October 2014.

11 October 2014: the Court postponed case to October 16 with the extending of the detention of the defendants.

16 October 2014: the court postponed case to October 26 for issuing the verdict with the extending of the detention of the defendants after watching the prosecutions videos as an evidence. Lawyers - including the former presidential candidate Khaled Ali and the head of the lawyers syndicate Sameh Ashour - pleadings continued for more than 6 hours depending on the unconstitutionality of the protest law under the new amendment of the constitution and the Supreme Constitutional Court is currently reviewing a lawsuit questioning the legality of the Protest Law.

26 October 2014: A Heliopolis misdemeanor court sentenced Ettehadiya case defendants charged with violating the protest law to three years in prison and a 10 thousand Egyptian-pound fine.

== Local and international reactions ==
Many international human rights organizations asked for the release of the detainees immediately after they were arrested including Human Rights Watch, Amnesty international, African Commission on Human and Peoples' Rights, Among others.
