= Yara Sallam =

Egyptian activist

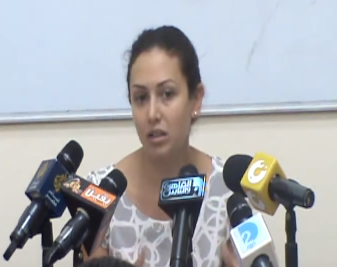
- Born: November 24, 1985 (age 40); Cairo, Egypt
- Occupation: Human rights activist

Yara Sallam (Arabic: يارا رفعت سلّام; born November 24, 1985) is a prominent Egyptian feminist and human rights advocate. She has worked as a lawyer and researcher for several Egyptian and international human rights organizations, as well as for the African Commission on Human and Peoples’ Rights (ACHPR).

On June 21, 2014, she was arrested along with at least 30 other activists who were marching near Ittihadiya Palace, the Presidential offices in Cairo, in a peaceful demonstration against the Egyptian law that curtails the right to protest. Her trial along with 22 fellow demonstrators, all charged with violating the protest law, has become a symbol of resistance to harsh restrictions on dissent imposed by the government of President Abdel Fattah el-Sisi.

Amnesty International called the case a "show-trial based on scant and dubious evidence that is intended to be a clear warning to anyone who defies Egypt’s protest law."

== Career and activism ==
Yara Sallam was born in Cairo's Heliopolis district to parents with a history of engagement in leftist causes. She later said, "I didn’t need to read the theories and the books to practice feminism. I was lucky to be raised in a leftist family that believes in equality between men and women, and applies these values."

Sallam also told an interviewer in 2013 that her interest in human rights emerged at the age of 15, when "I was a member in Al-Nosoor al-Sagheera (The Young Eagles), which was working on children's rights." According to the Egyptian online newspaper Mada Masr, "The group attracted middle-class families with leftist leanings and who sent their children to the group’s meetings and camps in the 1990s and early 2000s. The group contributed to engaging these children with human rights issues."

Sallam studied law, receiving a law degree from Cairo University in 2007 and a Maîtrise in Commercial Law from Pantheon-Sorbonne University in Paris, France in 2007. She also studied in the United States, and received a Master of Laws degree (LL.M.) in International Human Rights Law from the University of Notre Dame in 2010. While pursuing these degrees, she also worked professionally as a human rights activist in Egypt. As a researcher at the Cairo offices of the Institut de recherche pour le développement, a French think-tank, she investigated the effects of divorce law and policy on Egyptian women's lives. Later she joined the Civil Freedoms Unit at the Egyptian Initiative for Personal Rights (EIPR), a leading domestic human rights group. There she focused on discrimination and violence against religious minorities. Hossam Bahgat, founder of the EIPR, later recalled: “One of the remarkable things about Yara is her ability to carry out professional work without losing sight of her feelings ... I remember in 2009 when there were attacks on Baháʼís' home in a village near Sohag, I came into Yara’s office while she was taking a testimony over the phone from a 70-year-old woman; the woman’s house had been burned down, she had been expelled from her village, and her only hope was to return to her home to die there. Yara hung up, put the phone down next to her, and started writing on the computer while bursting into tears.”

After receiving her LL.M, Sallam moved to The Gambia to work as a legal assistant to the African Commission on Human and People's Rights. She returned to Egypt after the 2011 Revolution, and was recruited by Nazra for Feminist Studies, a women's rights group, to direct its Women's Human Rights Defenders program. Her work documenting abuses against women activists won her the North African Human Rights Defender Shield Award in 2013, given by the Pan-African Human Rights Defenders Network. Describing the situation of Egypt's women that year, Sallam said, "Not only do we have a government that does not bear its responsibility for human rights violations, including violence against women rising to the extent of rape with sharp weapons in Tahrir Square, but also allows statements from officials blaming women for the sexual assault. ... The struggle continues, not only against the regime, but also with civil groups who are not convinced of the importance to push for women’s inclusion in the public sphere."

In June 2013, she rejoined the Egyptian Initiative for Personal Rights as a researcher in the Transitional Justice Unit. She took the lead in documenting the violent repression of anti-government protests in the summer and fall of 2013, massacres which led to the deaths of over 1000 protesters.

== Arrest and trial ==
Acting president Adly Mansour signed a new Egyptian protest law on November 24, 2013. The law, passed by decree in the absence of any democratically elected authority in the country, gives the government sweeping powers to approve or ban any demonstration. It mandates prison terms of 2–5 years for protesters “calling for disrupting public interests.” The law was quickly used to imprison prominent dissidents, including Alaa Abd El-Fattah and human rights lawyer Mahienour El-Massry, as well as many other peaceful anti-government protesters.

Egyptian activists called for an international day of solidarity in opposition to the protest law, for June 21, 2014. On that day, a demonstration numbering at least several hundred people gathered in the Heliopolis neighborhood of Cairo and moved toward the presidential palace. Men in civilian clothes attacked the protesters with broken bottles and rocks, without interference from the police, while uniformed security forces fired tear gas. The security forces arrested 30 or more demonstrators, among them Yara Sallam and her cousin, who were seized while buying water from a kiosk. Sallam's cousin was freed the same night, but, according to Amnesty International, "Yara Sallam was kept in detention after security forces discovered she works at the Egyptian Initiative for Personal Rights (EIPR)." Detainees later released from jail told local human rights organizations that "a number of the arrested protesters were beaten and threatened to be charged with belonging to the banned Muslim Brotherhood" or the revolutionary April 6 Youth Movement.

14 men and 8 women arrested at the march went to trial on June 29, facing years of possible imprisonment under the protest law. (Another defendant, a child, is being tried separately). In addition to Yara Sallam, the defendants include Sanaa Seif, a student and revolutionary activist who is the sister of Alaa Abd El-Fattah; photojournalist Abdel-Rahman Mohamed; and photographer Rania El-Sheikh. At the June hearing, at a courtroom in the Tora security compound south of Cairo, a judge refused to release the defendants on bond, and even turned down requests to remove male detainees' chains. He postponed the case for more than two months. Since then, the male detainees have been jailed in Tora Prison, a high-security complex notorious for holding political prisoners, and the female detainees in the women's prison at El-Qanater. After subsequent hearings on September 13 and October 11, the trial was postponed till October 16. On the latter date, the judge announced he would deliver a verdict on October 26.

In prison, Sallam has continued to defend other people's human rights. In July 2014, Egypt's government-affiliated National Council for Human Rights (NCHR) sent investigators to El-Qanater Prison to interview women detainees in the case about their treatment. The women activists declined to meet with the visitors, and delegated Yara Sallam and Salwa Mehrez to inform them "that if they want to know the reality of the situation in prison, they should be meeting other detainees who are in much worse condition and experience more abuse." Shortly before the arrest of Sallam and her colleagues, Egyptian human rights organizations documented widespread patterns of torture and sexual abuse of women detainees at El-Qanater, where many supporters of the banned Muslim Brotherhood are also held. On October 26, a Heliopolis misdemeanor court sentenced Ettehadiya case defendants including Yara charged with violating the protest law to three years in prison and a 10 thousand Egyptian-pound fine.

== Presidential pardon and release ==
On 23 September 2015, one day before the Egyptian president Abdel Fattah al-Sisi departed for New York to meet with the United Nations General Assembly, a "presidential pardon" was announced to include 100 young people convicted in several controversial cases with seemingly politically motivated charges, including the "Shura Council protests" case and the "Ettehadiya Presidential Palace clashes" case and were serving time for charges including violating the protest law, Sallam's name was among them. the pardon also included defendants with "critical health conditions", Sallam was consequently released.
