= Soueif =

Soueif is a surname. Notable people with the surname include:

- Ahdaf Soueif (born 1950), Egyptian novelist and political and cultural commentator
- Joseph Soueif (born 1962), Lebanese bishop
- Laila Soueif (born 1956), Egyptian human and women's rights activist, and mathematician, sister of Ahdaf
