= Peter Greste =

Australian journalist (born 1965)

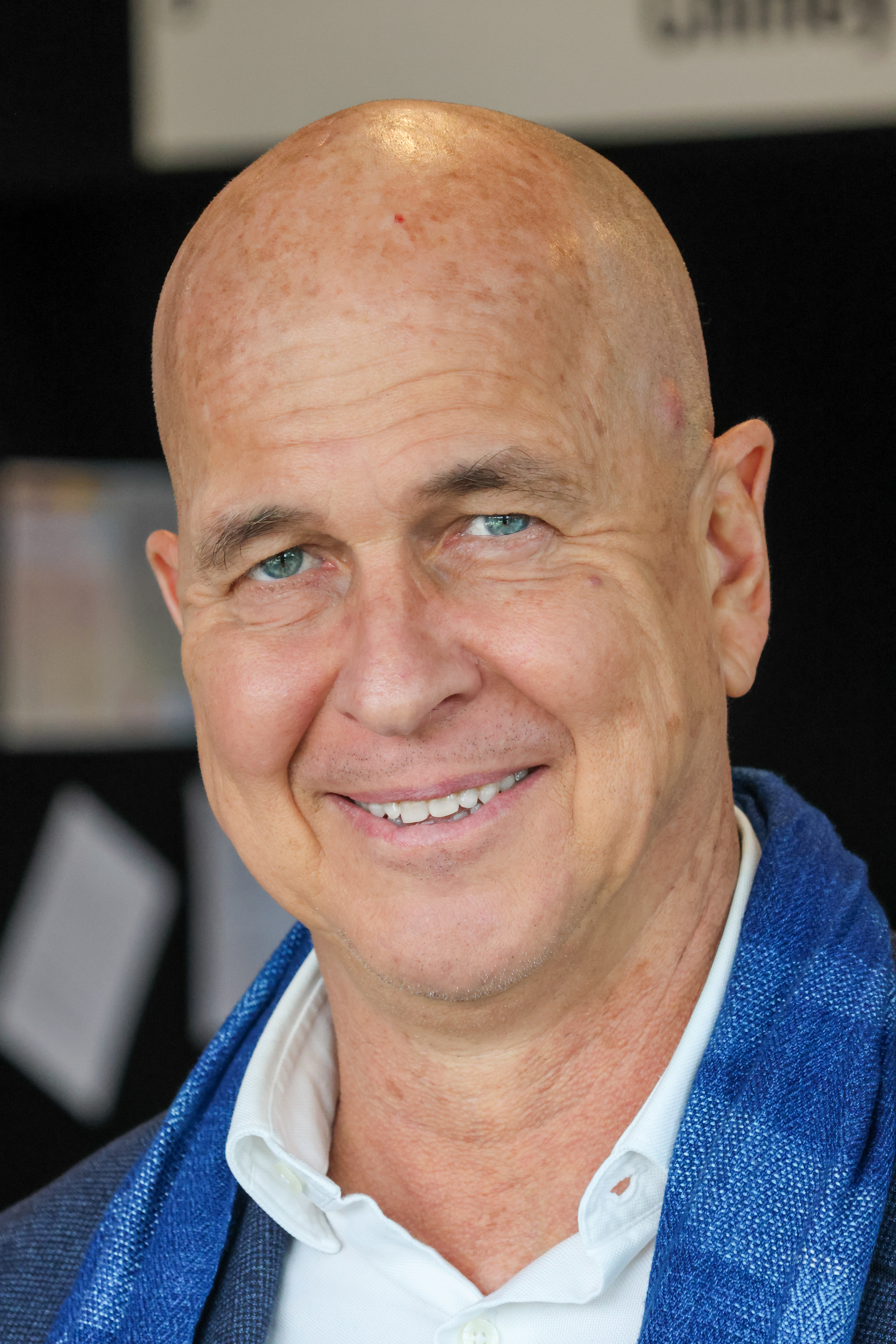
- Greste in 2026
- Born: 1 December 1965 (age 60); Sydney, Australia
- Citizenship: Australian; Latvian
- Education: Queensland University of Technology
- Occupations: Academic, journalist, writer
- Notable work: Freeing Peter (2016); The First Casualty (2017)
- Status: Arrested and jailed in Cairo, Egypt on 29 December 2013 and sentenced for 7 years on 23 June 2014 Deported to Australia on 1 February 2015 to face prison or trial (Australia did not uphold) Egyptian retrial in absentia on 29 August 2015 increased jail sentence by another 3 years
- Convictions: Falsifying news and having a negative impact on overseas perceptions of Egypt
- Penalty: 10 years prison (2013–2023); 400 days served (2013–2015)

Peter Greste (Latvian: Pēteris Greste; born 1 December 1965) is a dual citizen Latvian Australian academic, memoirist and writer. Formerly a journalist and foreign correspondent, he worked for Reuters, CNN, the BBC, and Al Jazeera English; predominantly in the Middle East, Latin America and Africa.

On 29 December 2013, Greste and two other Al Jazeera journalists were arrested by Egyptian authorities in Cairo. On 23 June 2014, Greste was found guilty of falsifying news and having a negative impact on overseas perceptions of the country, and sentenced to seven years prison. The Australian Government intervened and negotiated on his behalf with a new Egyptian government.

On 1 February 2015, Greste was officially deported to Australia (via Cyprus) on the condition that he face prison or trial in his home country; a condition which Australia did not uphold. At a retrial on 29 August 2015, an Egyptian court sentenced Greste in absentia to another three years in prison. However, he avoided serving that sentence because he was already out of Egypt and did not return. If the full sentences had been served, Greste would have been incarcerated until December 2023.

== Early life and education ==
Peter Greste was born on 1 December 1965 in Sydney, Australia. He has Latvian ancestry and two younger brothers.

Greste was school captain of Indooroopilly State High School, and holds a Bachelor of Business degree from the Queensland University of Technology in Brisbane.

== Early career ==
From 1991 to 1995, Greste was based in London, Bosnia, and South Africa, working for Reuters, CNN, WTN and the BBC. In 1995, he was based in Kabul, Afghanistan, as a correspondent for the BBC and Reuters, followed by a year in Belgrade as a correspondent for Reuters.

Greste returned to London and worked for BBC News 24. He was next based in Mexico, then Santiago, as a correspondent for the BBC.

Greste returned to Afghanistan in 2001 to cover the start of the War in Afghanistan. Afterwards, he worked across the Middle East and Latin America. From 2004, Greste was based in Mombasa, Kenya, then Johannesburg, South Africa, followed by six years in Nairobi, Kenya.

In June 2011, Greste reported from dangerous areas in Somalia, including Mogadishu, presenting Somalia: Land of Anarchy for the BBC programme Panorama. That year, he left the BBC and became a correspondent for Al Jazeera English in Africa.

== Egyptian trial and imprisonment ==
In late December 2013, Greste was arrested in Cairo with Al Jazeera colleagues Mohamed Fadel Fahmy and Baher Mohamed. "The interior ministry said the journalists had held illegal meetings with the Muslim Brotherhood", which was recently declared a terrorist group; furthermore, the journalists were accused of news reporting which was "damaging to national security". In January 2014, Egyptian authorities were reportedly going to charge twenty Al Jazeera journalists, including Greste, of falsifying news and having a negative impact on overseas perceptions of the country. The United Nations High Commissioner for Human Rights urged Egypt to "promptly release" the Al Jazeera personnel in custody.

On 21 February 2014, Greste was refused bail and his case was adjourned until 5 March. During a 31 March hearing, Greste asked to be released, telling the judge "The idea that I could have an association with the Muslim Brotherhood is frankly preposterous." On 23 June, Greste was found guilty and sentenced to seven years in prison. Mohammed Fahmy also received seven years while Baher Mohamed received ten years. International media reaction was swift and negative. US Secretary of State John Kerry described the prison sentences as "chilling and draconian" and noted that he had spoken to Egyptian governmental officials including President Abdul Fattah al-Sisi. Despite widespread international media condemnation, al-Sisi declared that he would not interfere with judicial rulings.

Internationally, Greste and his colleagues were portrayed as political prisoners due to the nature of the trial, the evidence presented and the sentences imposed. On the other hand, "Cairo felt that the Qatari media outlet (Al Jazeera) had become a mouthpiece for the ousted and banned Muslim Brotherhood. The harsh sentences were handed down as a warning to the Gulf state to not get involved in Egyptian domestic politics." On 1 January 2015, the Court of Cassation announced a retrial for Greste and his colleagues. Release on bail was not permitted. The Australian Government intervened, and Greste was officially deported to Australia (via Cyprus) on 1 February. The Egyptian law allowing the deportation of foreigners stipulated that they face prison or trial in their home country, but Australia did not uphold either. Otherwise, no explanation was given for his release.

On 29 August 2015, an Egyptian court sentenced Greste and his two colleagues to another three years in prison, with Baher Mohamed receiving an additional six months. Greste was tried in absentia and avoided imprisonment because he was deported to Australia in February and did not re-enter Egypt.

On 23 September 2015, Fahmy and Mohamed were pardoned by Egyptian President al-Sisi.

== Later career, academia, and other activities ==
In 2017, Greste wrote, directed, and featured as interviewer in Facebook: Cracking the Code, a 45-minute television documentary for the ABC Television programme Four Corners. The episode's theme was the "lack of online privacy and the lengths the tracking goes to", but it also told Greste's personal story of how his supporters used Facebook's algorithms to help spread his own story.

In February 2018, Greste was appointed UNESCO Chair in Journalism and Communications at the University of Queensland.

In 2018 Greste presented the ABC series Monash and Me, a two-part TV documentary miniseries on the heroics of Australian First World War military commander Sir John Monash. In the making of the series, Greste discovered his own family's role in Monash's First Australian Imperial Force.

In 2020, with Australian lawyer Chris Flynn and journalist Peter Wilkinson, Greste co-founded the not-for-profit Alliance for Journalists' Freedom. Their focus is on working with governments to implement media freedom laws, and campaigning in the Asia Pacific region. One of their aims is for the Australian Government to enact a Media Freedom Act.

In 2022, Greste commenced as an adjunct professor of journalism at Macquarie University.

On 2 November 2022, Greste delivered a public lecture on media freedom and national security titled "The Pen and The Sword" on ABC Radio National's program Big Ideas.

Greste has brought attention to Alaa Abd El-Fattah, whom he described in 2022 as "easily the best-known political prisoner in Egypt today". He cited Abd El-Fattah's collection of writings entitled You Have Not Yet Been Defeated (2021) as especially meaningful to him, because, when imprisoned with Abd El-Fattah for several months in 2014, he had helped him to understand their predicament, and given him the psychological tools to survive what they went through. After the Egyptian authorities had extended Abd El-Fattah's sentence beyond its end date, on 30 September 2024 his mother Laila Soueif began a daily hunger strike outside the UK government's Foreign Office in Westminster. In mid-January 2025 Greste joined Soueif for a 21-day hunger strike.

== Books ==
In 2016, Penguin Books published Freeing Peter, Greste's biographical account of his family's efforts to free him from an Egyptian prison.

Greste's next book, The First Casualty (2017), was shortlisted for the 2018 Walkley Book Award and reportedly contains a "first-hand account of how the war on journalism has spread from the battlefields of the Middle East to the governments of the West". On 1 April 2025 a new edition of The First Casualty was released by Greste and UQP ISBN 9780702269141, retitled The Correspondent to tie in with the film.

== Recognition and awards ==
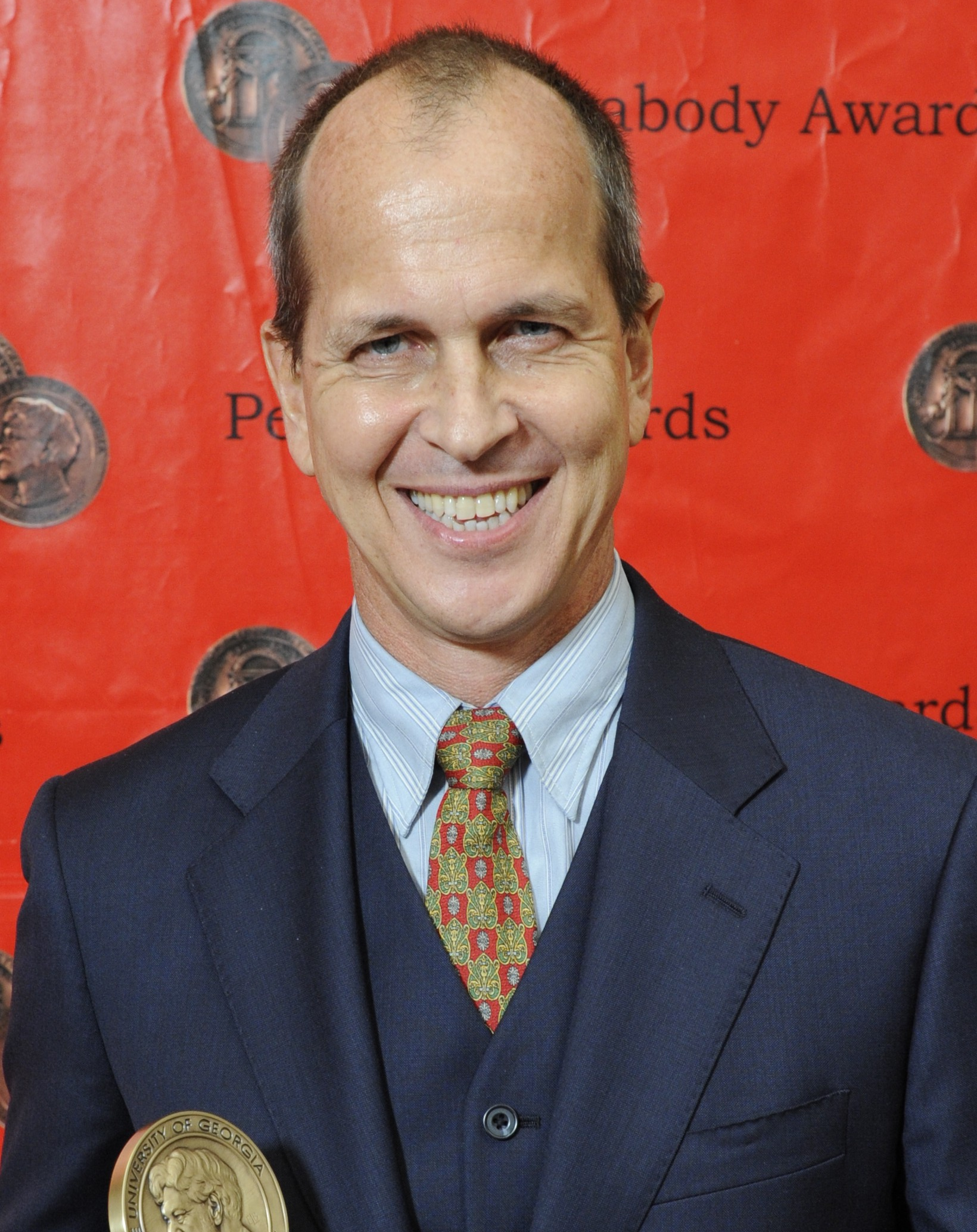
Greste in 2012 with his Peabody Award

Greste won a Peabody Award for a BBC documentary on Somalia in 2011. Somalia: Land of Anarchy was aired on Panorama in June 2011.

Two weeks after being released from prison and deported from Egypt in February 2015, Greste accepted a special Royal Television Society award in London on behalf of himself and two Al Jazeera colleagues, Baher Mohamed and Mohamed Fahmy, for sacrifices to journalism.

After separately advocating widely for freedom of the press and free speech, Greste was individually awarded the 2015 Australian Human Rights Medal.

He has also won the International Association of Press Clubs' Freedom of Speech Award and the RSL's ANZAC Peace Prize.

== In film ==
In October 2024, The Correspondent, an Australian film adaptation of Greste's experiences, had its world premiere at the Adelaide Film Festival. Based on Greste's 2017 memoir The First Casualty, the screenplay was written by Peter Duncan and the film was directed by Kriv Stenders. The role of Greste was played by Richard Roxburgh.

== Personal life ==
Greste is a dual citizen of Australia and Latvia.

He met his partner, Christine Jackman, around six months after being released from prison in Cairo. She is a former correspondent and journalist, writing Long-form journalism. In 2021 Greste was stepfather to her two teenage boys.

In 2021, the State Library of Queensland commissioned a digital story and an oral history interview with Greste.

In a 2022 interview at Macquarie University, Greste said he was a keen kitesurfer. He was then living in Brisbane.
