= Khaled Ali =

Labor activist and lawyer

Khaled Ali خالد علي
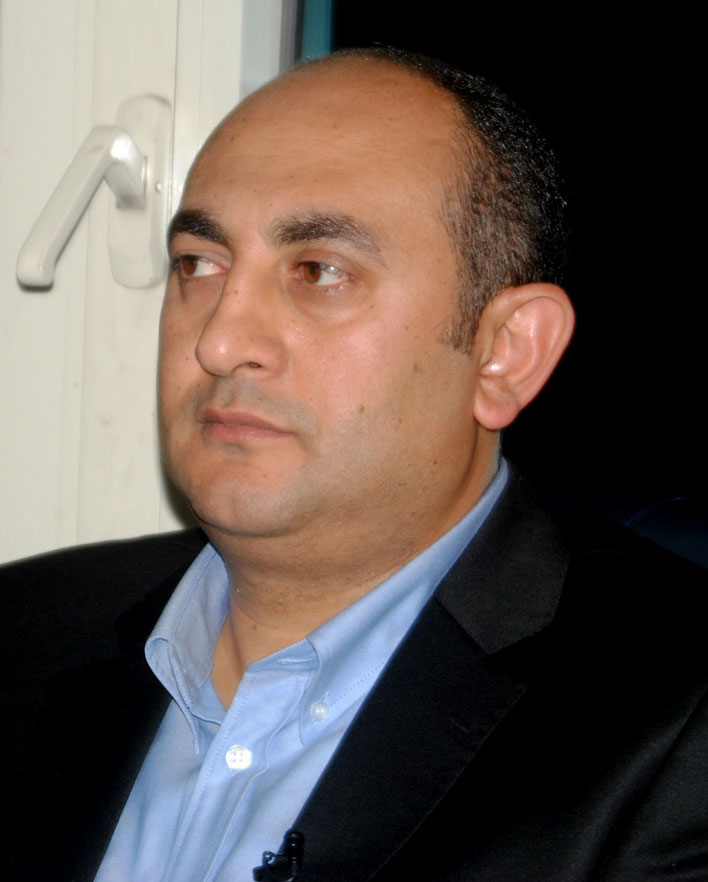
- Khaled Ali in February 2012
- Born: Khaled Ali Omar; 26 February 1972 (age 54); Mit Ghamr, Dakahlia Governorate, Egypt
- Education: Zagazig University
- Occupations: Lawyer; labor activist; politician
- Years active: 1995–present
- Known for: Labor advocacy; fighting government corruption
- Style: Left-wing politics
- Political party: Bread and Freedom Party (2013-2018)
- Spouse: Nagla Hashem

Khaled Ali (also spelled Khaled Aly; Arabic: خالد علي, IPA: [ˈxæːled ˈʕæli]; born 26 February 1972) is an Egyptian lawyer and activist. He is known for his advocacy for reform of government and private sector corruption and for promoting social justice and labor rights. He is the former head of the Egyptian Center for Economic and Social Rights (ECESR), and co-founder of the Front for Defending Egyptian Protesters and the Hisham Mubarak Law Center (HMLC).

Known as a "legendary anti-corruption crusader", Ali has been involved in several prominent court cases against the government, including a 2001 ruling that gave syndicates more freedoms, a 2010 case he won that mandated a higher minimum wage for workers, and a case leading to the nationalisation of three large companies that had been privatised. He won the "Egyptian Corruption Fighter" award in 2011.

Ali was an activist before, during, and after the 2011 Egyptian Revolution. He has been involved in worker strikes before and since the downfall of Hosni Mubarak's regime, and has been an active supporter of the role of workers in the revolution and the labor mobilisation that took place during it. He has denounced violent acts by the police and military, and has represented revolutionaries and the families of those killed in court. He was against the rule of the Supreme Council of the Armed Forces and supported postponing the drafting of a new constitution until after the 2012 election.

A latecomer to the 2012 presidential race, Ali announced his candidacy the day after he became eligible to run, making him the youngest candidate in the election. His platform was one of social and economic justice, including core issues such as regional economic strength, protecting natural resources, fighting corruption, addressing unemployment, and improving workers' rights. Ali laid great stress on education, which he believes will lift Egypt out of poverty. Having never belonged to any political party, he called himself the "candidate of the poor" was supported primarily by students, activists, farmers, and workers, generally on the left of the political spectrum.

Ali announced he would run for the 2018 presidential race, but ultimately withdrew.

== Background ==
Ali was born in Dakahlia Governorate to a modest rural family He enrolled at Zagazig University’s law school in 1990 and graduated in 1994. Upon graduating, he undertook an unpaid internship at a local law firm before co-founding the HMLC in 1999.

== Activism under the Mubarak regime ==
Ali has been a prominent labor activist and lawyer. He is the former head of the ECESR, a founding member of the HMLC, a founding member of the Front to Defend Egyptian Protesters (started in 2008), and a founder of "the coordinating committee for the defense of the rights and freedoms of association." Al-Ahram Weekly called him a "legendary anti-corruption crusader". In 2011, he was given the "Egyptian Corruption Fighter" award by the Egyptians Against Corruption movement.

=== Legal victories ===
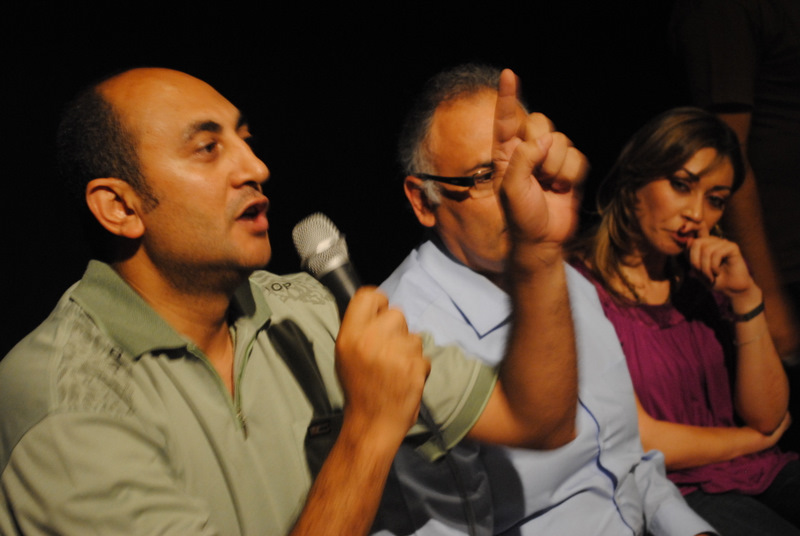
Ali speaking at Tweet Nadwa in July 2011

Ali's career has been highlighted by several prominent legal cases and victories, most involving corruption and the private sector. He fought corruption by the Mubarak government, which had illegally privatised public land and public sector factories. Suing government officials for selling public property, he won a judgment ordering the return of several large companies to public ownership.

A 2001 judgment in a case spearheaded by Ali saw labor syndicates gain more freedoms. His victory winning the renationalisation of large companies, sold by the former regime in corrupt deals, included retailer Omar Effendi, the Nile Cotton Weaving Company and several other factories. Ali also served on the legal team that halted the privatisation of Egypt's national health insurance and presided over the legal team advocating for transparency and protection of public insurance and pension funds.

Ali is known for filing and winning a landmark court case in 2010 that forced the government to set a minimum wage commensurate with the cost of living; it was raised to 1,200 Egyptian pounds per month and covers all workers. In February 2010, he said, "The government represents the marriage between authority and money—and this marriage needs to be broken up... We call for the resignation of Ahmad Nazif's government because it only works for businessmen and ignores social justice. We call for a minimum wage and a maximum wage, as well as the connection of wages to prices. We also call for annual wage increases in line with inflation rates. We are against the privatisation of the health insurance sector and call for the fixing of all temporary labor contracts." In April 2010, there was a demonstration outside the cabinet office, where approximately 300 workers protested the government's privatisation policy and against the Egyptian Trade Union Federation (ETUF), which is controlled by the government. Ali said at the time, "We'll give them a month. If after a month the verdict hasn't been applied in a manner acceptable to workers, all the workers forces taking part in this protest will stage repeated protests until it is implemented," Ali said.

=== Supporting strikes and the public sector ===
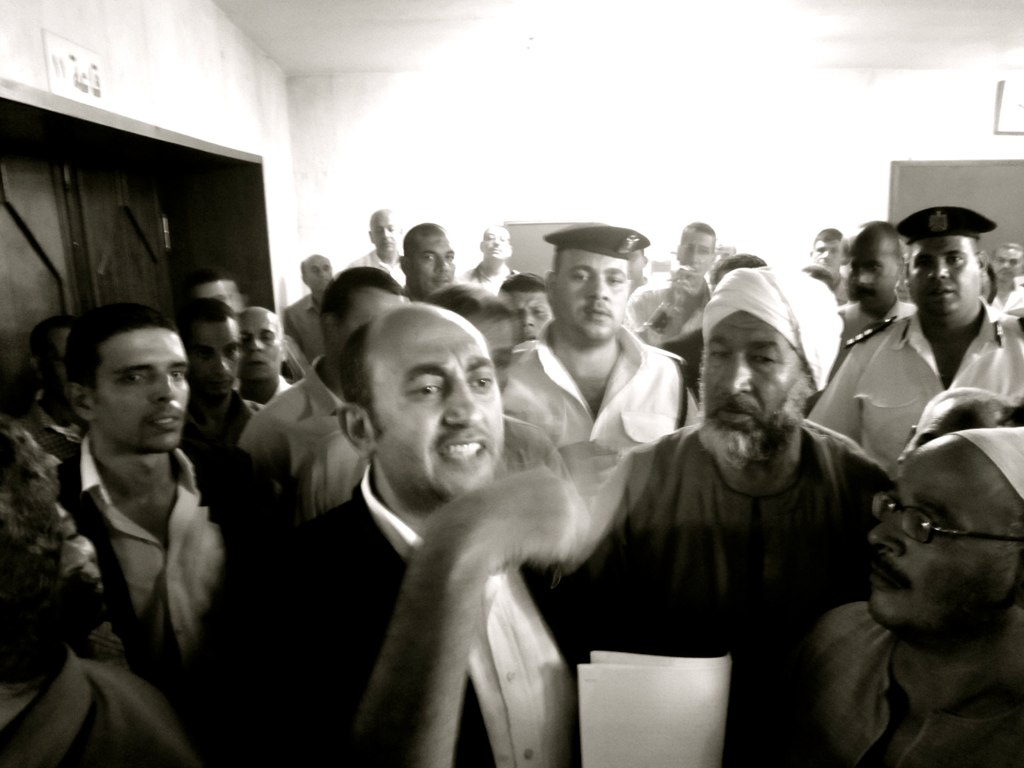
Ali among Egyptian workers protesting against privatisation in July 2011

Throughout Ali's career, he has been a strong supporter of worker's strikes and public sector activism. In 2007, Ali noted the growing trend of strikes as a sign of political change: "Taboos were broken during the past few years of political ferment, and workers grew less afraid," he said. Speaking to a reporter in April 2008 about the general strike taking place, Ali noted that its purpose was not to harm the economy, stating that "the point was to make a strong statement and to take a stand."

Ali supported the December 2008 founding of the independent General Union of Real Estate Tax Authority Employees (RETA). In 2009, amid protests of the state-controlled ETUF and agitation for independent unions in a broad section of trades, Ali said of the tax authority and growing political action by workers in a number of sectors, "The RETA set the example for other workers and civil servants to follow. It's indeed the single most important independent political project in 2009." He also addressed the problem of Egyptian labor, distrust of political parties, which have tried to co-opt labor's causes, and the fear that demonstrations would be brutally suppressed by the government, stating that "there is also a tactical dimension to trying to avoid the wrath of the government and its security apparatus." Ali made the distinction between politics and political parties, however, citing the Muslim Brotherhood's control of professional syndicates, versus the intertwining of Egypt's progressive political movement and labor. "For years, labor constituted the social heart of the progressive political movement, which in turn served as the political brain for labor. That was important for the labor movement to articulate its discourse and negotiate its demands," Ali said.

Ali was interviewed in Cairo in February 2011 by a correspondent from Democracy Now!. Ali said that while middle class youth sparked the Arab Spring, which expressed the political will of the Egyptian people of different classes, the workers had set the stage. "Workers laid the ground for the emergence of this revolution, and I believe that any analysis which says otherwise is superficial," said Ali.

The workers have successfully launched and sustained the largest wave of labor mobilisations this county has seen, from 2004 until 2011. The workers are the ones who brought down the structures of this regime in the past years. They are the ones that have been fighting for independent organising on the ground, and they're the ones who created Egypt's first de facto independent trade union. And they insisted on the right to have pluralistic trade unions, not just unions that are stacked with government supporters. They're the ones who brought their grievances to the streets.

— Ali in an interview on Democracy Now!

Ali has called on state authorities to allow workers to self-manage their companies when they are stalled, or when investors flee the country.

== 2011 Egyptian Revolution and its aftermath ==
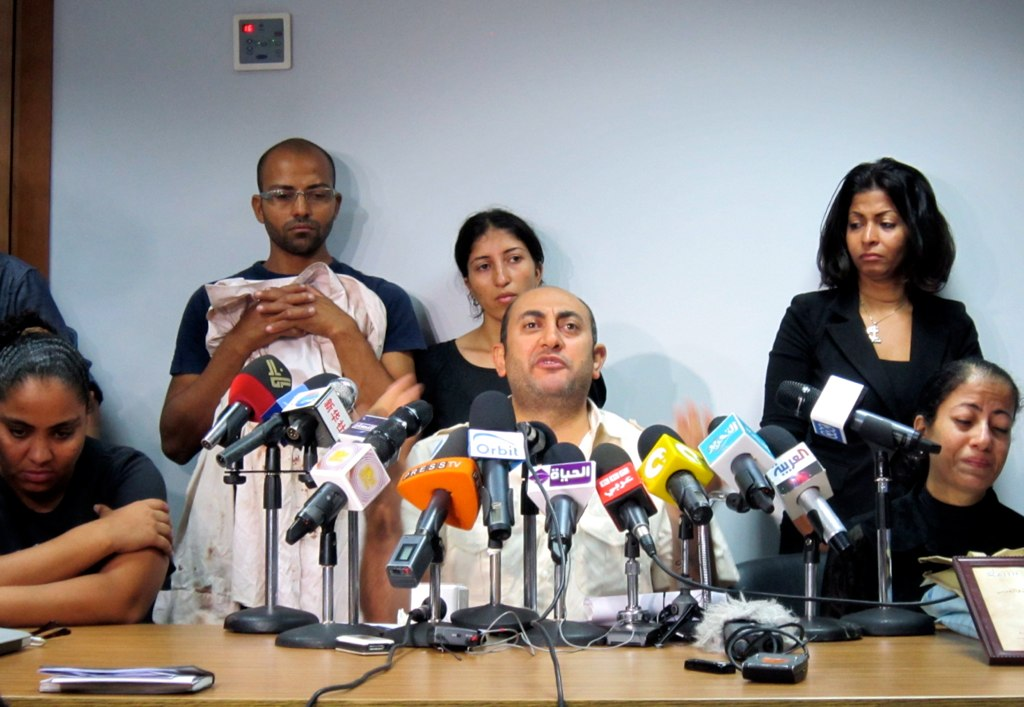
Ali with some of the families of the victims of the Maspero massacre in October 2011

Ali was active in the 2011 revolution, supporting worker's strikes and representing protesters and the families of martyrs against the government, while condemning the violence of the Supreme Council of the Armed Forces (SCAF) and Egypt's police forces.

On 3 February 2011, Ali was among those detained by security forces after a raid on the HMLC in Cairo. Amnesty International condemned the raid, which it characterised as a "crackdown", accusing the Egyptian authorities of "attempting to suppress the wave of popular protest" then taking place all across Egypt.

Between 11 February and mid-April 2011 alone, the SCAF tried more than 5,000 civilians before military tribunals in trials generally lasting between 20 and 40 minutes in which groups of five to 30 defendants were tried at a time. (Note: By late August 2011, SCAF had held 12,000 military trials of civilians, surpassing the 10,000 such trials held by the Mubarak regime over the course of its 30 years in power.) Acting on behalf of a Rasha Azab, a former military detainee, Ali was one of two lawyers who challenged the military's decision to try civilians before military tribunals by bringing a lawsuit to Egypt's Court of Administrative Justice.

In June 2011, Ali was heard by the Administrative Court regarding a lawsuit seeking to overturn Law 34/2011, passed by the SCAF and the Cabinet and which criminalized certain protests and strikes. Ali said, "Protests and strikes have always been workers' only weapon … since they have no ability to negotiate with the government — depriving them of this right is depriving them from voicing their suffering." He said further, "The law was billed as the 'freedom of work and preventing sabotage' law, while it is actually meant to prevent workers and poor people from protesting." In August 2011, Ali took part in a press conference held by 36 non-governmental organisations (NGO) to condemn a "fierce campaign" by the government and SCAF to limit protests. He criticised the Ministry of Social Solidarity for what he saw as their attempt to "monopolise" patriotism and decried the defamation of activists protesting against Mubarak and privatisation, as well as the practice of trying civilians before military tribunals as human rights violations committed by the Cabinet and SCAF.

In order to gain a more accurate picture of the revolution and gauge its success, Ali has been involved in efforts to collect information about its participants, especially those who suffered injury or were killed.

We are in the process of collecting documents about the numbers of people who died and who are injured. Among them – among the questions that we're asking people is, "Where did the deceased live? Was he a worker, or was he unemployed? And do they work on a temporary basis? Are they government employees? Are they permanent workers? How much was their salary?" Until now, most of the cases we have encountered are cases of people who were poor and lived in poor neighborhoods. They're the ones who came out and joined these street battles during the revolution. They're the ones who were not afraid of being shot. They're the ones who were killed. These people gave their lives without ever claiming that they were the owners of this revolution. We need real documentation to know how this revolution truly succeeded.

— Ali in an interview on Democracy Now!

Ali condemned the violence in Egypt since the revolution and has been working with the families of 17 unarmed protesters killed by the military in October 2011, ten of whom were crushed to death when armored vehicles drove over them and seven others who were killed when soldiers fired into a crowd.

== 2012 presidential candidacy ==
=== Announcement ===
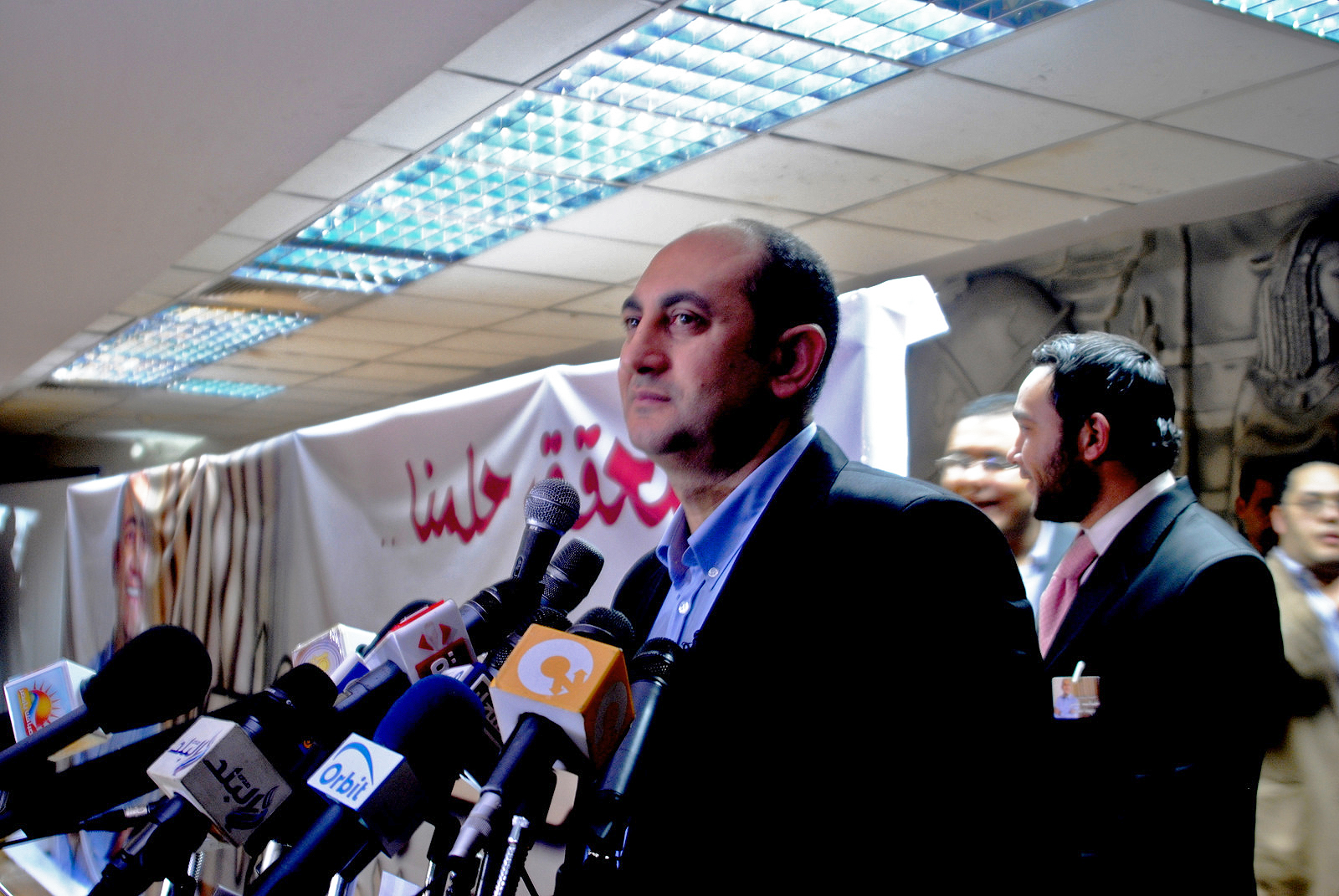
Ali announcing his candidacy in February 2012

On the evening of 27 February 2012, Ali held a press conference at the Journalists' Syndicate in Cairo to announce his candidacy for president in the 2012 election, hours after announcing the press conference on Twitter. The press conference was a well-attended event, held one day after his 40th birthday, the minimum age eligible to run for the office. He was the youngest candidate to enter the race, saying at the press conference that he "decided to pursue the race as a young man, inclined to support the poor, against military rule and with the rights of our martyrs. I am not afraid, so long as I have the support of all those who dream of freedom, justice, and dignity." At the time, he was an independent and had never been a member of any political party.

Though known as an activist long involved with labor and social justice, Ali insisted that he does not speak for the revolution, which he said is incapable of being represented by any one person. "Am I the candidate of the revolution? Am I the candidate of the young? No! I'm only one voice of many," Ali said in his announcement, calling himself the "candidate of the poor." He said he was running "as an independent young man who [has] sided with the poor" against military rule. His campaign slogan has been translated as "We will fulfill our dream" and "We will realise our dreams."

Gamal Eid, a well-known leftist lawyer and the director of the Arab Network for Human Rights Information, who works with the Ali campaign, said that a group of activists and workers began campaigning even before Ali announced his candidacy.

=== Platform ===
In his candidacy announcement, Ali declared that his entire platform was "built on the basis of social justice," saying it was "not just decoration" but rather his primary focus and guiding principle, and for him, a higher priority than winning the election. He said his mission was to achieve the revolution's goals and spoke of the need to lift Egypt out of poverty, citing education as a "fundamental tool" to accomplish this goal.

According to Ali supporter Eid, social and economic issues, including social equality, restoration of public property illegally sold under Mubarak, ending foreign debt, and stronger opposition to the Israeli occupation of Palestine were possible points to center Ali's platform around. Ali said, "We must also support the Palestinian struggle against the Zionist occupation; we must collaborate with the Palestinian resistance and lift the blockade on Gaza". Other main issues include building regional economic strength with Iran and Turkey to free the region from "American domination", reversing corrupt Mubarak-era business deals, farmland rehabilitation, raising employment and protecting the rights of workers, natural resources and mineral wealth.

Ali wanted the public sector to regain its status and social importance by "providing affordable goods and proper employment policies". Private property as a concept was not a problem for Ali, who believes that "no society can properly develop" without it; however, the enjoyment of it does not carry the inherent right to violate labor laws. "The worker will not have to visit his employer every day to kiss his hand to get consent. Only law would regulate the relationship between employees and their employers," said Ali. Speaking of his priorities as president, Ali said his primary focus would be restoration of Egypt's assets, lost when the former regime sold them off illegally. Ali called for a mixed economy and a "partnership" of the public, private and cooperative sectors that would prevent price fixing and monopoly. Ali declared his support of reviving the public sector "with or without U.S. consent".

Ali is very critical of the military Supreme Council of the Armed Forces (SCAF). He has accused them of propaganda and state-media manipulation surrounding the election. He advised the military to maintain its relationship with the Egyptian populace and not to parrot the police, who lost its favor. He spoke out against military ownership of industry and the means of production. Ali has criticised economic assets accumulated by SCAF, championing the need to renationalise factories and other assets. "It is precisely this plethora of institutions they own that prevents them from properly carrying out their mandate," he argued. One particular example Ali criticised is foreign exploitation of 120 of Egypt's gold mines, saying use and development of the nation's mineral wealth should be planned and not become a means for foreign companies to benefit. He also said the army should turn factories and economic projects over to the public sector and let the unemployed work, rather than conscripts.

Ali said some people have exploited Egypt's revolution for their own gain and criticised members of the military and power elite, saying their previous connections with Mubarak have not weakened their undue influence in Egypt. He also spoke against the efforts of military leaders to politicise the police and army, saying plainly, "Stop the use of police and army in media and politics." According to him, the drafting of the new constitution should have been delayed until after the military rulers relinquished power to a civilian government. "It is not reasonable to hold presidential elections while drafting the constitution at the same time," he said.

Ali criticised the transitional military government, which he said used violence to attack both youth and revolutionaries. Asked about allowing the "wheel of production" to turn in order to increase stability and reduce protests, Ali said, "Let the wheel of production stop until it turns with justice," pointing out that allowing production to return did not guarantee an improvement to the underlying problems causing the protests. "Under Mubarak, the wheel increased poverty of the poor while increasing the wealth of the rich," he said, adding that whoever was elected "must be more accountable to Egyptians than Mubarak," vowing to both stand up to military and power elites, and empower the poor if his candidacy was successful.

=== Supporters ===
Ali draws his base of support from his prior work as a lawyer and activist, and his involvement in workers' rights and the 2011 revolution. Many of his supporters were students and activists who were active in the overthrow of the Mubarak regime. He is widely popular among labor and student movements due to his continual efforts at reform and social justice.

=== Reception ===
Many of Ali's supporters saw him as filling the void left by Mohamed ElBaradei's withdrawal. Samer Soliman, professor of political science at the American University in Cairo acknowledged the gap but expressed some doubt about Ali's ability to fill it. Ali is known primarily as an activist lawyer and as such, as a politician, he was not widely known to his fellow citizens; even those in his circles were surprised by his decision to run, according to Al Akhbar. In contrast to Ali's activist past, some of his well-known opponents were former associates or members of the Mubarak regime. Ali's lack of experience as a politician was also a concern and many, even within the revolutionary movement, remained skeptical about his candidacy, which is seen as a long shot. Critics argued that his campaign was an uphill battle and risked splitting the vote, which could benefit candidates connected with the prior regime.

Members of the Socialist Popular Alliance Party and Egyptian Socialists told the Egypt Independent that they were giving "serious consideration" to support of Ali's candidacy. Marwa Farouk, a member of the Popular Alliance, said that some were "proposing a potential partnership between Khaled Ali and Abouel Fotouh [where Ali can run as his deputy]." No party had yet endorsed Ali as of March 2012.

== Political activities since 2014 ==
Ali expressed opposition to the Egyptian Constitution of 2014, calling it "inappropriate" for Egypt.

Ali initially planned to run as a candidate in the 2014 presidential election. However, he withdrew his candidacy on 16 March 2014, after the passage of the presidential elections law, describing the election as a "farce" while also urging incumbent Abdel Fattah el-Sisi not to run and the army to stay out of politics.

In November 2017, Ali announced that he would run in the 2018 presidential election, but announced his withdrawal in January 2018, citing "government violations and unfair competition".

Ali continues to practice the law, mainly representing political cases, and many of the political figures of the Jan 25th revolution currently behind bars such as Alaa Abd El-Fattah.

== Legal issues ==
=== 2017 public indecency charge ===
In September 2017, the Dokki Misdemeanor Court handed Ali a three-month prison sentence and ordered a bail of 1,000 Egyptian pounds for "offending public decency" while celebrating a court victory in which he successfully reversed a decision to transfer the sovereignty of the Tiran and Sanafir islands to Saudi Arabia. Ali denied the charge and said he would appeal the decision, with the defence team arguing that video evidence used against Ali had undergone "manipulation". In a statement, Amnesty International characterised the ruling as "a clear signal that the Egyptian authorities are intent on eliminating any rival who could stand in the way of President Abdel Fattah al-Sisi’s victory [in the 2018 elections]."

In November 2017, Ali successfully appealed the ruling, on the grounds that the Dokki Misdemeanor Court had failed to hear the defense's arguments. In September 2018, the Dokki Misdemeanor Appeals Court upheld the ruling, but suspended his sentence for three years.

=== 2017 sexual misconduct allegations ===
In October 2017, an unnamed woman circulated an email to various activists and civil society workers accusing Ali of sexual harassment over an incident that took place at his Cairo office in 2015, in which Ali allegedly requested to meet her and steered their conversation toward her personal and sexual relationships, before asking her to spend the night with him. The woman formerly worked with Ali at the ECESR.

In February 2018, the Bread and Freedom Party, which Ali formed in 2013, announced that their investigative committee acquitted him of all charges, but Ali later announced his resignation from both the party and the ECESR, denying the allegations but apologising to the woman, stating that "just her thinking about me in this way and her writing an email of this nature means that I must offer an apology for the pain she experienced. Regardless of the results of the investigation, I bear part of the responsibility, which has prompted me to offer this apology." A formal complaint to the public prosecutor was filed against him later the same month.

=== 2018 travel ban ===
In October 2018, a judge issued an order banning Ali from travelling abroad over suspicions of links to a case dating back to late 2011 alleging foreign financing of Egyptian NGOs to harm national security.

== Publications ==
- Saber Barakat and Khaled Ali, Our Insurance Rights, published by the Egyptian Center for Economic and Social Rights
