= I Saw Ramallah =

1997 book by Mourid Barghouti

- 1997 Arabic edition
- Author: Mourid Barghouti
- Language: Arabic; English
- Published: 1997
- Publisher: The American University in Cairo Press/Bloomsbury
- English publication date: 2000/2005
- Media type: print
- ISBN: 978-0-74-757470-5

I Saw Ramallah is an Arabic language autobiographical book written by Palestinian writer and poet Mourid Barghouti. The English translation of this book was first published in 2000 by the American University in Cairo Press, and later on 16 May 2005 by Bloomsbury. The Egyptian novelist and bestselling author, Ahdaf Soueif, translated the book to English.

== Synopsis ==
Barghouti begins his account in 1966, when he traveled to Cairo University, Cairo, Egypt to pursue higher studies. In 1967, following the Six-Day War and attaining his BA, Barghouti attempted to return to Palestine, but was barred from entering the country. Like many others, he began to live in protracted exile abroad. Thirty years later in 1996, after continuous struggle, he was allowed to enter Ramallah, the hometown where he grew up. Throughout the book, Barghouti traces his journey and records his impressions with people and locations from when he first enters through the Allenby Bridge, to when travels and reaches Ramallah, and when he visits the village of Deir Ghassana where he was born. He also highlights crucial life stories like his deportation from Egypt under the Sadat administration and him living and writing in Budapest, Hungary. Simultaneously, he records the many ways in which Palestinian life has transformed since the time of his exile as a result of sociopolitical developments, with it becoming dictated by travel restrictions and permits, and long hours of detainment.

Barghouti employs memory as an instrument to describe his personal journey and the political chaos that has impacted his life, land and people. It serves as a crucial feature of his life and as a system of confronting the suppression of Palestinian identity. His account also details the gradual expansion of Israeli settlements into the West Bank, the inability for Palestinians to counteract Israeli state violence and constraints its places on movement, and the ineptness of the Palestinian Authority in safeguarding Palestinian rights and statehood.

== Reviews ==
Edward Said wrote that the book was "one of the finest existential accounts of Palestinian displacement that we now have". A review in The Guardian said that the novel "is an intensely lyrical account of the poet's return to his hometown". A 2024 review by TheDaak Review praised the book for being "imminently accessible, thoughtful and historical."
