= Ahmed Seif El-Islam =

Egyptian human rights lawyer

- أحمد سيف الاسلام
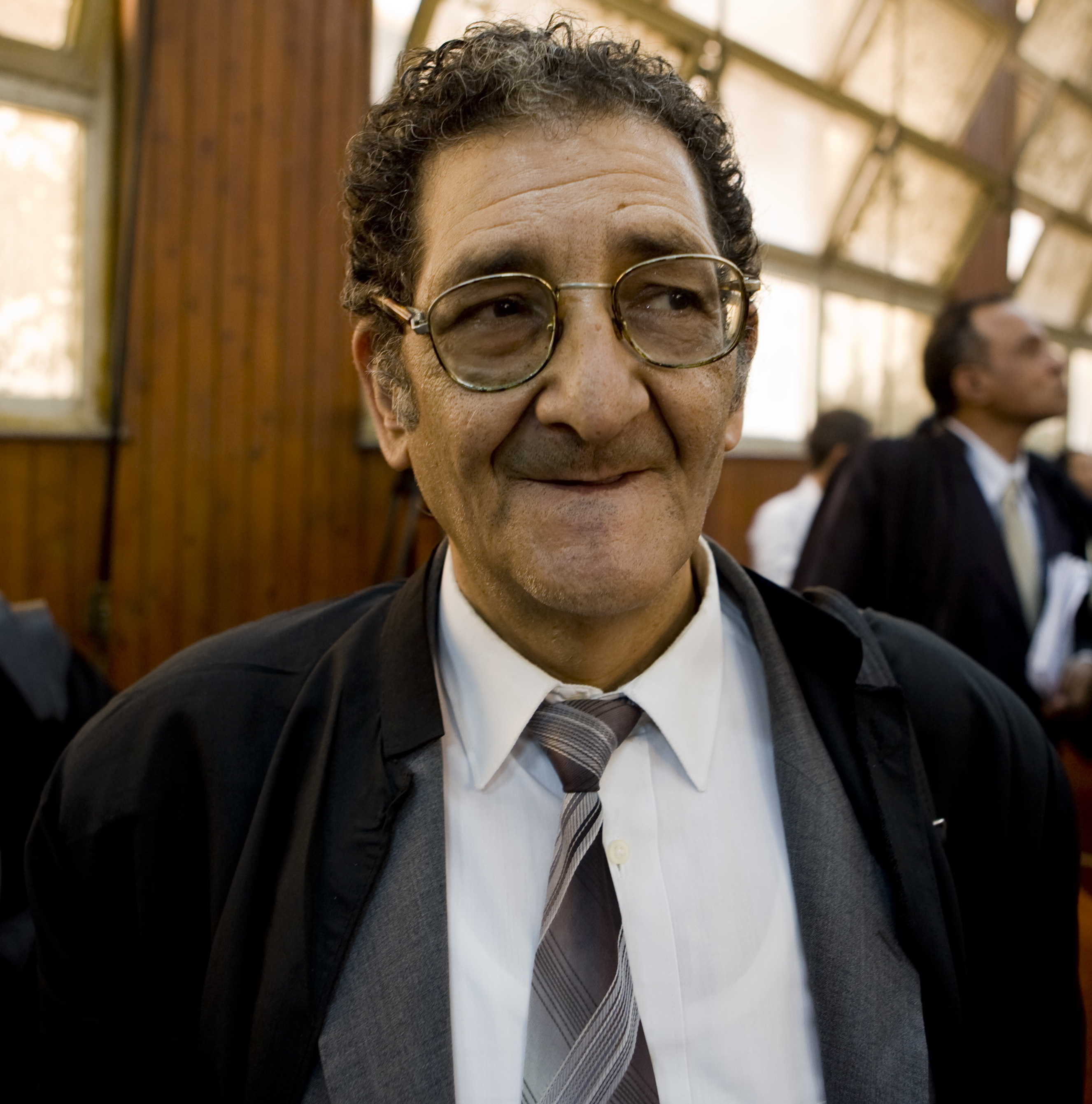
- Seif in 2008
- Born: أحمد سيف الإسلام عبد الفتاح حمد; 9 January 1951; Damanhour, Egypt
- Died: 27 August 2014 (aged 63); Cairo, Egypt
- Education: Cairo University
- Spouse: Laila Soueif
- Children: Alaa Abd El-Fattah; Mona Seif; Sanaa Seif
- Website: http://ahmedseif.wordpress.com/

Ahmed Seif El-Islam (Arabic: أحمد سيف الاسلام; 9 January 1951 – 27 August 2014) was an Egyptian communist, human rights activist and lawyer. He was the father of the social activists Alaa Abd El-Fattah, Sanaa Seif and Mona Seif. He was married to social activist and professor Laila Soueif, who is also the sister of novelist Ahdaf Soueif.

== Early life ==
Ahmed Seif El-Islam was born in Hosh Eissa, Beheira Governorate in 1951. He graduated from the Faculty of Economics and Political Science of Cairo University in 1977. While serving a five-year sentence in prison for a free speech case, he earned a degree in law from Cairo University in 1989. He also received a degree in criminal law from the same university.

== Political, legal and human rights activism ==
In the 1970s, Seif was a leader in the student movement; accordingly, he was arrested and tortured by the police forces several times, especially in the so-called “organized popular movement” case. In prison and during his detention period, he got his bachelor's degree in Law. After he was released, he volunteered to defend defendants with various affiliations, in cases concerning opinion; such as the "Revolutionary Socialists" and "Islamic Liberation Party" cases in 2003 and 2004, respectively. He also defended many cases before the high Constitutional Court.

In 2008, Seif was part of the team defending 49 persons, who were tried before the high State Security Court in Tanta, north Cairo. They were accused of participating in popular protests on 6 April 2008. The protest was in solidarity with the Mahala workers strike, which was primarily in the state-run textile industry, in response to low wages and rising food costs; however, violent clashes between the police and protestors took part. The lawyers' team claimed that all confessions from the side of defendants were taken under the pressure of torture during their detention period. The case ended up acquitting and freeing 27 defendants and convicting 22 others.

Seif was one of the lawyers defending the 13 defendants, who were affiliated to Abdullah Azzam Brigades and were accused of the Taba terrorist bombing in 2004. Three of them were sentenced to death and other to life imprisonment; however, the Security Council of Armed Forces did not ratify the sentences and the defendants went to rehearing and retrial. Seif raised concerns about the unconstitutionality of the court; accordingly, the retrials were postponed till 13 December 2013, in order to provide measure certificate that proves the unconstitutionality of the court and the annulment of Emergency Law.

After the 25 January uprising, Seif was a member of the Personal Liberty Protection Commission, which was formulated by Presidential Decree number 5 for 2012. The commission was responsible for reviewing all cases of civilians, who were tried and sentenced by a military court in the period between 25 January 2011 and 30 June 2012. It was also mandated to review situations of all political prisoners, who were held by the Ministry of Interior or other entities. Finally, the commission was assigned to examine cases of protestors who were sentenced by civilian courts.

== Detention ==
Seif was detained four times: twice during the Sadat era and twice during the Mubarak era.

In 1972, Seif was held in custody for two days for joining student demonstrations demanding the liberation of Sinai. In the following year, he was detained for eight months after participating in protests rejecting president Sadat's speech and the deferment of the decision of the upcoming war with Israel, Seif and his mates were released days before the October War and stated that "he had not been tortured in prison".

In 1983, Seif and 16 others were accused of membership in a leftist organization, but only Seif and four of his mates spent five years in Citadel prison. Seif suffered during his time in prison, he was beaten and tortured by electricity, until his arm and leg were broken. A legal complaint was submitted regarding the incident but was ignored.

Commenting on that, Seif said: "I Had the Chance to escape to London when my wife Dr. Laila and my son Alaa were there but I changed my mind although the security were willing to help me escaping to get rid of me as a political activist but I had an agreement with my wife to turn myself in, despite the fact that my wife was pregnant with my second kid Mona, I chose to spend 5 years in prison in my country rather than escape and live at least 15 years away, so I turned myself in, and I had received my law degree in prison, but the history repeats itself my daughter was born during my time in prison and the same happened with my son Alaa, his son Khalid was born while his father in prison."

The experience of detention and torture pushed Seif to dedicate his activities to defending human rights.

Seif was also detained for two days in 2011 on 3 February, the day known as "Battle of the Camel", when the security forces stormed Hisham Mubarak Law Center and arrested Seif and other human rights activists and Journalists.

== Death ==
Seif died aged 63 on 27 August 2014 at Qasr El-Einy hospital in Cairo, from complications following heart surgery. Two of his three children – Alaa Abd-elFattah and Sanaa Seif – were unable to visit their father in hospital because they had been jailed for taking part in protests against the law banning unsanctioned demonstrations.
