= You Have Not Yet Been Defeated =

2021 book by Alaa Abd el-Fattah

- Author: Alaa Abd El-Fattah
- Language: English
- Published: 2021
- Publisher: Fitzcarraldo Editions
- Publication date: 20 October 2021
- Publication place: England
- Pages: 444
- ISBN: 978-1-913097-74-5

You Have Not Yet Been Defeated is a 2021 book that consists of a collection of writings by Egyptian political activist, software developer, and prisoner of conscience Alaa Abd El-Fattah. The book covers the period from 2011 to 2021, bringing together essays, tweets, letters, and personal reflections smuggled out of Egyptian prisons. The translation was done by an anonymous collective of supporters, and the book was published by Fitzcarraldo Editions in the United Kingdom and Seven Stories Press in the United States.

The collection documents Abd el-Fattah's experiences during a decade of uprisings and repression in Egypt. This includes themes such as the Arab Spring, the failure of revolutionary movements, digital activism, and global solidarity.

== Background and author ==
Born in 1981, Alaa Abd El-Fattah was raised in a family of activists. His father, the human rights lawyer Ahmed Seif El-Islam, spent years in prison under earlier Egyptian regimes and died in 2014. Abd el-Fattah himself became a prominent voice during the 2011 Egyptian Revolution and was repeatedly imprisoned under various governments. In 2021, he was sentenced to five years for "spreading false news undermining national security" on social media.

During his incarceration, he is reported to have been tortured and given poor treatment such as blindfolding, stripping of clothes, and even prevention of buying clean water or food from the prison canteen.

== Content and themes ==
The book is structured as a collection of texts that together talk about the principles of resistance and the daily struggle of life under dictatorship. The writings mention a wide range of topics, including climate change, feminism, artificial intelligence, social media, capitalism, and movements such as BDS (Boycott, Divestment, Sanctions) and a myriad of other issues.

One of the main topics is Abd El-Fattah's analysis of the Arab Spring. He describes the 2011 and 2013 uprisings as a "defeat". Despite this, he said that the war on meaning is not over yet in the rest of the world, urging ongoing dialogue and the sharing of different experiences among oppressed people.

Another important theme is social dissent. Abd El-Fattah mentions that the internet serves as a crucial space for exchanging and exploring different ideas. He emphasizes the need to preserve it.

== Reception and significance ==
The book has been praised for its intellectual depth, emotional honesty, and stylistic innovation. In her foreword, Naomi Klein describes Abd el-Fattah's prose as "politically mature". She said that this book "must be read for the precision of its language, for its bold experimentations with form and style, and for the endlessly original ways its author finds to express disdain for tyrants ... Most of all, it must be read for what Alaa has to tell us about revolutions." She also stressed the importance of the book by saying: "The text you are holding is living history."

The collection has been recognized not only as a personal record of one of Egypt's most important activists but also as an important resource to understand resistance and political situations.

Reviewers have noted the dual nature of the work: a testimony of human rights violations and a philosophical call to rethink activism in the 21st century. The Guardian described it as a "heartbreaking, hopeful answer" to the question of how one person can carry the burden of struggle and legacy.

== Editions ==
- You Have Not Yet Been Defeated, UK: Fitzcarraldo Editions, 20 October 2021. ISBN 978-1-913097-74-5
- You Have Not Yet Been Defeated, US: Seven Stories Press, 19 April 2022. ISBN 9781644212455
