= Egyptian Center for Economic and Social Rights =

Egypt-based think tank

- المركز المصري للحقوق الاقتصادية والاجتماعية
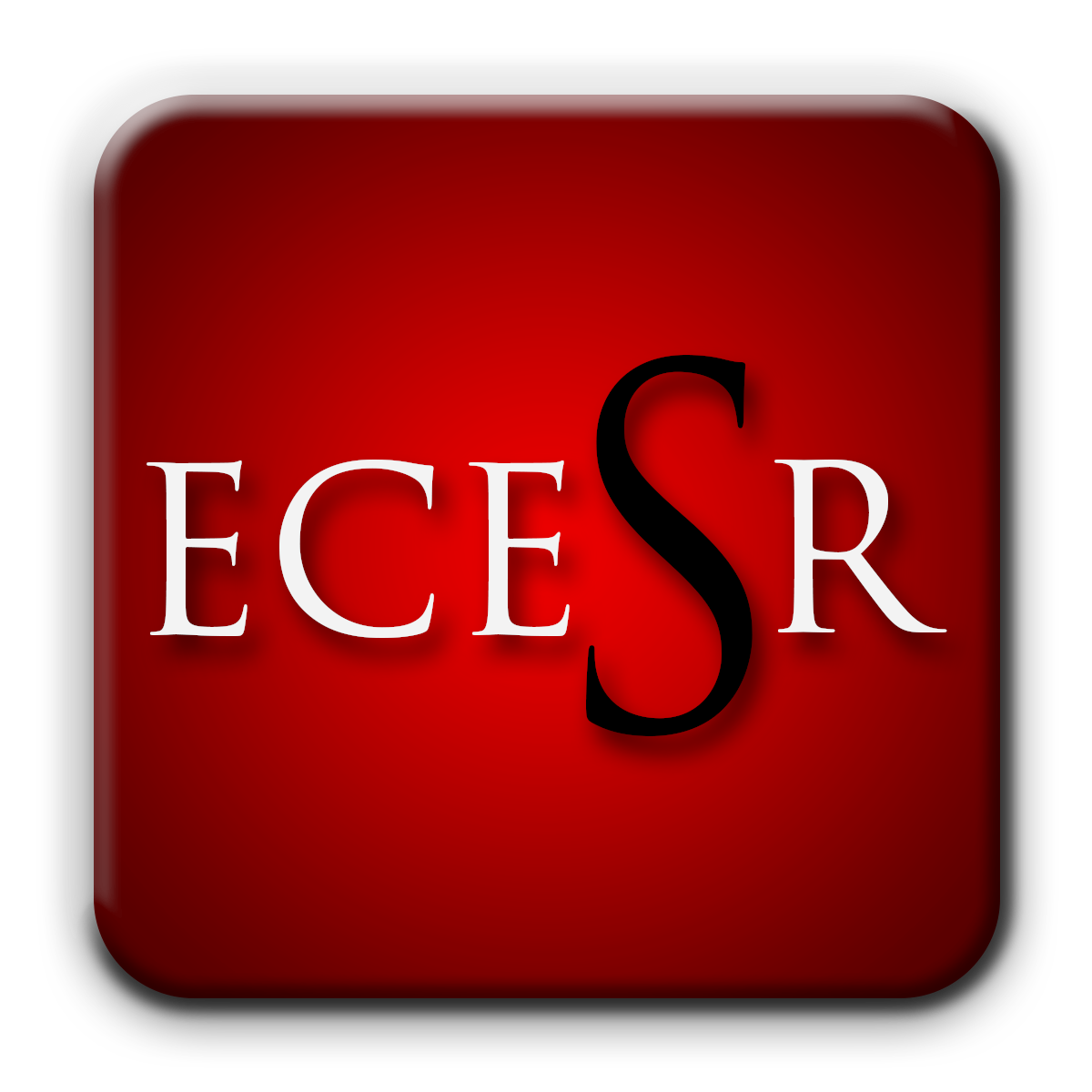
- Formation: 2009
- Type: NGO
- Headquarters: 1 El-Fadl St, From Talaat Harb St., Downtown Cairo, Egypt
- Location: Cairo, Alexandria, Daqahliya, Aswan
- Website: Official website

The Egyptian Center for Economic and Social Rights (ECESR) is an Egyptian non-governmental legal and research organization which addresses issues of Egyptian and Arabic human rights.

== Outreach ==
The ECESR sometimes coordinates with other NGOs to address human rights issues. In a report titled 'Above the State' the ECESR suggested that increased foreign investment may not lead to improved conditions for most Egyptians.

== Police raids ==
ECESR offices have been subjected to multiple raids by Egyptian police leading to protest from numerous other agencies.

== 2019 Egyptian protests ==
ECESR became well known during the 2019 Egyptian protests for its detailed documentation of arrests of protestors, and random passers-by. On 26 September 2019, five days after protests started, ECESR listed 1909 arrests related to the protests.

== See also ==
- Khaled Ali
- Hisham Mubarak Law Center
- Mohammed Adel (youth leader)
