= Mona Seif =

Egyptian activist

Mona Seif منى سيف
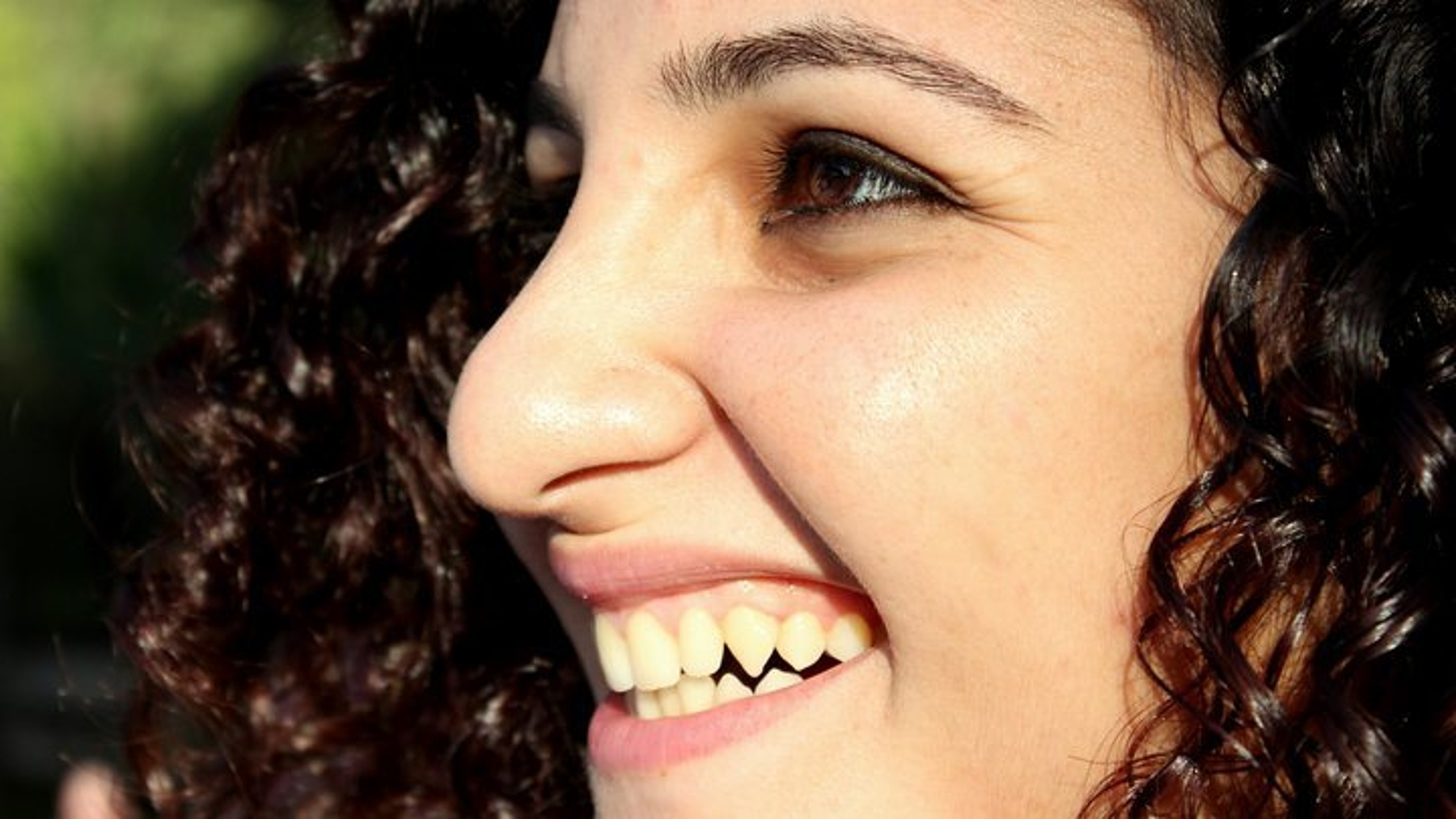
- Born: 12 March 1986 (age 40); Cairo, Egypt
- Occupation: Human rights activist
- Parent(s): Ahmed Seif; Laila Soueif
- Relatives: Alaa Abd El-Fattah (brother); Sanaa Seif (sister); Ahdaf Soueif (aunt)
- Website: http://tahrirdiaries.wordpress.com/

Mona Seif (Arabic: منى سيف, IPA: [ˈmonæ ˈseːf]; born 12 March 1986) is an Egyptian human rights activist known for her participation in dissident movements during and after the 2011 Egyptian revolution, for her creative use of social media in campaigns, and for her work to end military trials for civilian protesters. She is a biology graduate student, investigating the BRCA1 breast cancer gene.

== Background ==
Seif grew up in a family of activists in field of politics. Her father, Ahmed Seif, who died in 2014, was a human rights attorney and opposition leader who spent five years in prison during the Mubarak regime. During his detention, he was tortured. Her mother, Laila Soueif, is also an activist and a mathematics professor. She helped organize demonstrations against the Mubarak regime over the decades before his downfall. Her mother is "known on the streets as brash and courageous, and has on numerous occasions faced down baton-wielding policemen with nothing but her scolding, scathing, booming voice and steely eyes".

Seif's brother Alaa Abd El-Fattah co-created the Egyptian blog aggregator Manalaa and in 2005 began to document abuses by the Mubarak regime. Alaa was arrested at a demonstration in 2006 and imprisoned for 45 days, during which Mona and his wife Manal helped organize an online campaign to free him. Seif's younger sister, Sanaa Seif, has also been an opposition activist and protester.

Seif is a graduate student in cancer biology. She is studying the BRCA1 breast cancer gene and its mutation pattern in Egyptian patients. She says she has two full-time careers: one in cancer research, and another in human rights activism.

== 2011 revolution ==
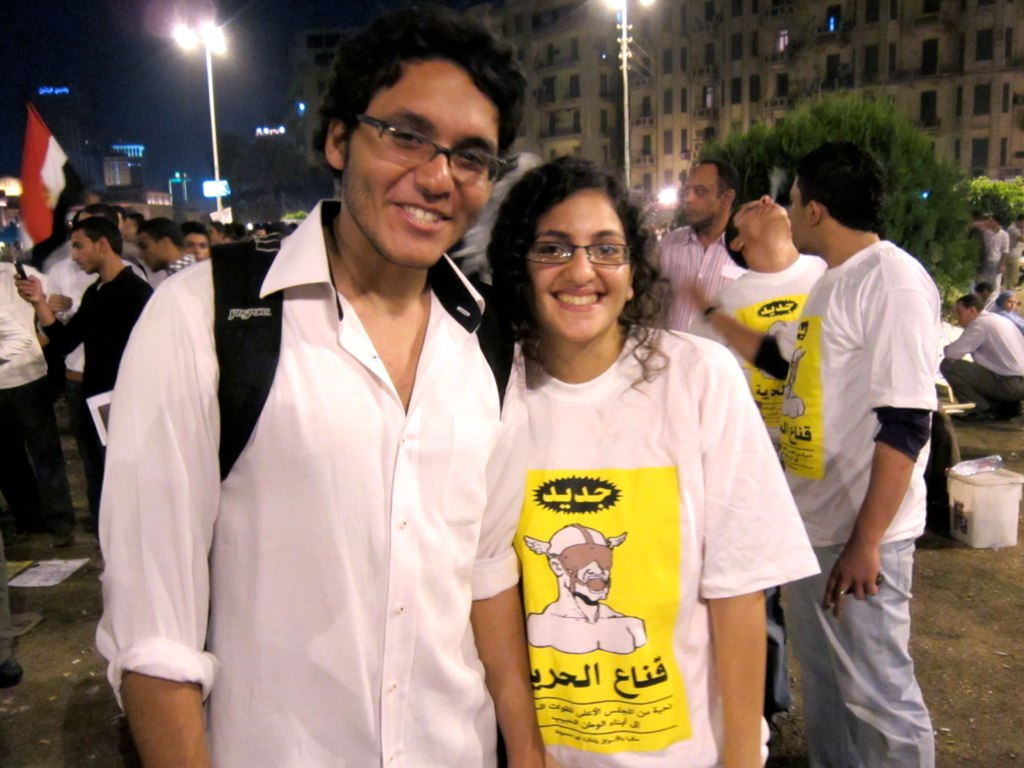
Nour (Ayman Nour's son) and Mona Seif.

In the year leading up to the revolution Mona became involved in the dissident movement, spreading awareness and attending demonstrations. Between January 25 and February 5, the members of her immediate family and many members of their extended family participated in the Tahrir Square protests. Mona recalls "It was a life-changing moment for most of the people in Tahrir Square. You could see the gunshots at people...".

== Post-Mubarak ==
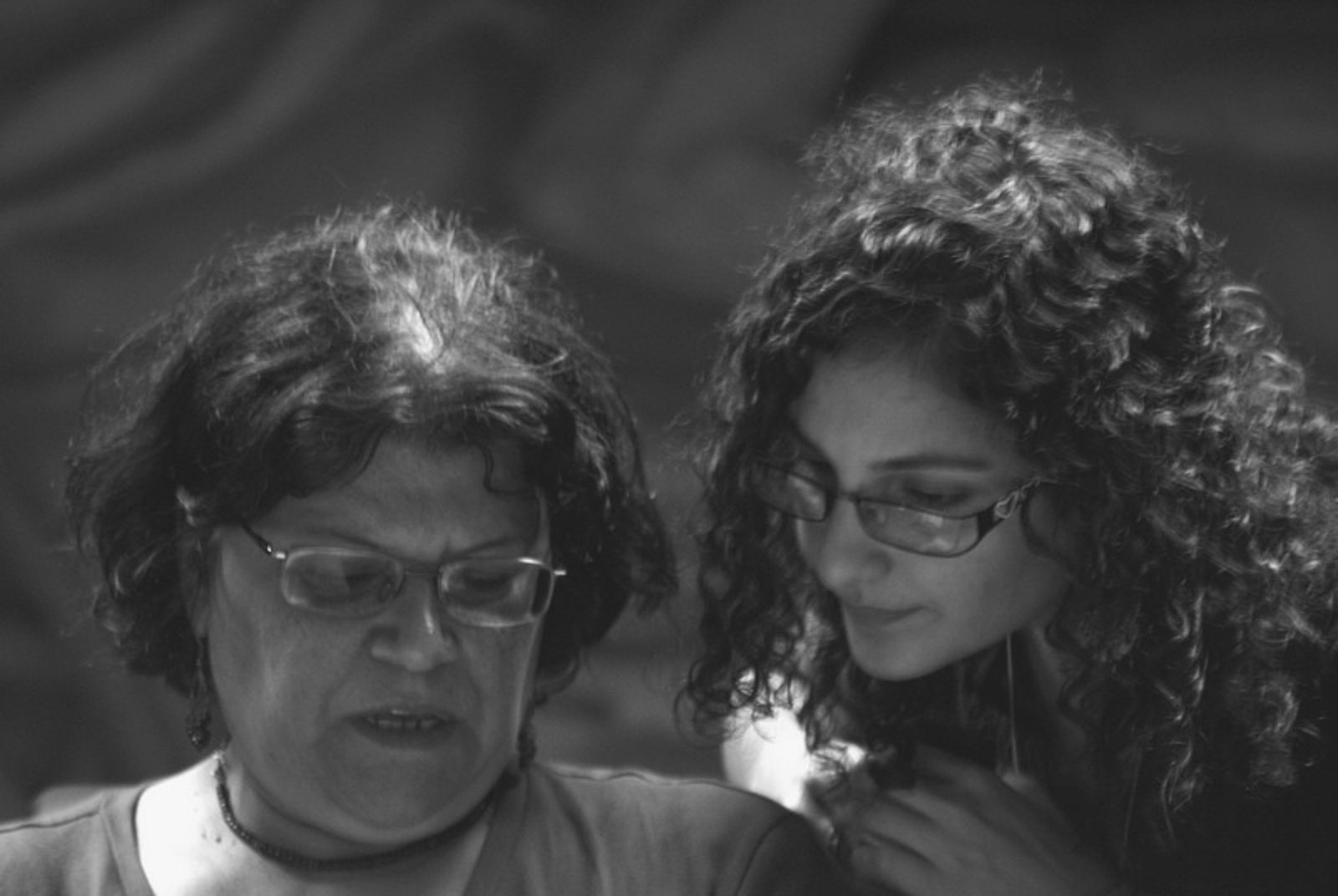
Dr. Aida Seif El Dawla and Mona Seif at the Anti-Torture conference

Seif is a founding member of No to Military Trials for Civilians, a group pushing for the release of those detained during the revolution; and end to trials of civilians by military courts; transfer of all such civilian facing trial to the jurisdiction of civilian courts; and the investigation of torture allegations involving military police. Seif wrote on her blog Ma3t, about the military police during crackdowns on Tahrir protesters, requesting people come forward with their stories.

She has been critical of the actions of Egypt's interim ruling body the Supreme Council of the Armed Forces (SCAF) saying, of the release of protesters without full exoneration: “The fact that they have suspended sentences does not give them the pride they deserve as revolutionaries who did nothing wrong."

Seif estimates that military courts have sentenced 7,000 civilians since former Hosni Mubarak's ouster in February, 2011. She notes that there has been a shift in the SCAF's approach since March and that protesters are now getting suspended sentences rather than the 3-5-year sentences they were previously getting. She speculates that this may be an attempt to stop the regular marches and may also be due to the pressure applied by international human right groups.

She has continued to criticize tactics of the SCAF: "We have evidence that the military right now is targeting protesters. ... They selected known figures of the Tahrir protest. They selected people who were known and they tortured and beat them up...and if you read or listen to the testimonies of those who were released, which are a few, we still have a lot of people detained unconstitutionally. And you see that it's not just that they're getting tortured or beaten up, but there's an element of the Army trying to break the revolutionary spirit."

Part of Seif's project involves asking detainees who have been released to record what happened to them. In some cases she says she has managed to get their testomies immediately after their release and so record bruise marks and burns. It is Seif's opinion that with these cases the only way to fight them is via the internet.

In 2012, she was a finalist for the Front Line Award for Human Rights Defenders at Risk, which ultimately went to Syrian blogger Razan Ghazzawi.

== Controversy ==
When it was announced in April 2013 that Seif was a finalist for the Martin Ennals Award for Human Rights Defenders presented by Human Rights Watch, both she and HRW were criticised for what some considered taking a firm pro-Palestinian stance. The specific accusations, made by the pro-Zionist UN Watch were that she tweeted support for violence in the form of attacks on the Egypt-Israel-Jordan gas pipeline; invasion of the Israeli embassy in Cairo and missile attacks on Israel. The accusations were examined and dismissed in detail by Scott Long, who denied the 3 tweets, of 93,000 examined, showed any evidence whatsoever of support for violence.

== See also ==
- Human rights in Egypt
- Asmaa Mahfouz
- George Ishak
- Wael Ghonim
- Mohamed Soliman
- Hossam el-Hamalawy
