= Sanaa Seif =

Egyptian activist and film editor

- Born: 20 December 1993 (age 32)
- Education: October 6 University
- Occupations: Political activist, Film Editor
- Parent(s): Ahmed Seif; Laila Soueif
- Relatives: Alaa Abd El-Fattah (brother); Mona Seif (sister); Ahdaf Soueif (aunt)

Sanaa Seif (Arabic: سناء سيف; born 20 December 1993) is an Egyptian-British activist and film editor who became actively involved in the Egyptian revolution in 2011. She was a student of languages and translation at October 6 University until her arrest in 2014. She was granted a presidential pardon, along with 100 others, in September 2015.

Seif was again arrested in June 2020, and released in December 2021, after a year and a half sentence.

== Background and personal life ==
Seif is a political activist and film editor from Egypt. Seif belongs to a politically active family. Her father Ahmed Seif was an activist and human rights attorney until his death in 2014. Sanaa's mother, Laila Soueif, is a professor at Cairo University and political activist promoting academic freedom in Egypt. Her two older siblings are also known in the activist community. Her brother Alaa Abd El-Fattah became an icon during the 2011 uprisings that toppled the Mumbarak regime. Her sister Mona Seif is a genetics researcher and political activist responsible for co-founding an Egyptian movement against military trials of civilians.

Seif began her activism in 2011 during the height of revolutionary protests in Egypt. Her first experience with protest happened when she became involved in a movement remembering Khaled Said. Her activism only grew from there and at 17 years old Sanaa, after experiencing protests in Tahrir Square, started an independent newspaper "al-gornal" with a few friends. The independent paper, addressing issues at the heart of the Arab Spring, quickly began popular and production rose to more than 30,000 copies printed per issue.

Since her initial involvement in the Arab Spring, Seif has also been very active in protest movements and human rights issues. Her image has become a symbol to revolutionaries who respect her political and human rights work and see her as a revolutionary spirit.

Seif studied language and translation at October 6 University.

== June 2014 protest and jail time ==
On 21 June 2014, twenty-three men and women, including Seif, were arrested outside of the presidential palace in Cairo for protesting the Egyptian protest law. The demonstration was to protest the government's anti-demonstration laws. In a resulting trial, the Cairo Criminal Court sentenced the protestors to "two years imprisonment and two further years of surveillance". According to an article by the Daily News Egypt, "the 22 defendants were appealing their sentencing to three years of imprisonment in October for violating the Protest Law and the use of violence with the aim of terrorising citizens". In addition to breaking Egypt's anti-demonstration laws, the protestors were charged with assaulting police officers and destroying public property. Since the time of the verdict, many international organizations including the African Commission on Human and Peoples' Rights, Amnesty International, the Human Rights Watch, and the Egyptian Initiative for Personal Rights have condemned the verdict. As of February 2015, none of the prominent activists from the movement were pardoned, despite rumors that pardons would be issued on the anniversary of the January 25th movement.

== June 2020 arrest ==
On 23 June 2020, the Amnesty International reported that Egyptian security forces kidnapped the human rights defender Sanaa Seif from outside the Public Prosecutor's office, New Cairo. The rights organization stated that she paid visit to the office to file a complaint against a violent assault, which she and her family suffered outside Tora Prison, a day earlier. The report stated that Sanaa was taken to the office of the Supreme State Security Prosecution in Cairo, where the prosecutors questioned her over the charges of "disseminating false news", "inciting terrorist crimes" and "misuse of social media".

In March 2021, Seif was sentenced to a year and a half in prison and had the right to appeal within 60 days. Upon the completion of her sentence, she was released on 23 December 2021.

== Hunger strike ==
Beginning on 4 September 2014, Seif and her brother, Alaa Abd El-Fattah, who was imprisoned in November 2013 for breaking the anti-demonstration law in addition to other charges, began a hunger strike from their respective prisons, while the rest of the family partook at home. This was in response to the Egyptian authorities refusing to clear Alaa Abd El-Fattah to visit his dying father, prominent humanitarian lawyer Ahmed Seif al-Islam, in addition to the jailing of Sanaa Seif. Both Sanaa and Alaa ended their hunger strike on 19 November 2014, after fears from their family that they were in danger of death. This is not the first time that Sanaa Seif has partaken in a hunger strike. On 28 August 2014, Sanaa underwent a hunger strike with several other women prisoners to protest the Protest and Public Assembly Law. The family has been known to go on frequent partial hunger strikes.

== Image in popular culture ==
Seif has become a symbol of the revolution through her activist work. In the years since 2011, Sanaa's image has become more of a symbol to revolutionaries in Tahrir Square than her connection to her family's activism. She has been highly involved on the ground since attending the protest in response to Khaled Said's beating and death at the hands of the Egyptian police. Seif's image is seen by some as the spirit of the revolution prompting artistic representations of her such as the mural in Rome, Italy, by artist Ammar Abo Bakr.

=== Social media presence ===
Since Seif's arrest her supporters have created both a Facebook page and a website providing updates on her jail sentence and calls for her release. The hashtag #FreeSanaa has been used to spread awareness of her situation. According to her pages, hundreds of people have used both #FreeSanaa and #NoProtestLaw to show unity with her fight.

=== The Square (2013) ===
Seif was actively involved with the documentary film The Square. She was an editor and shooter on the film. The film details the events of the Egyptian revolution from 2011 to 2013 through the perspective of young activists. The film is particularly critical of the Egyptian Military. The film received much critical acclaim winning awards at the Sundance Film Festival and winning best feature honor at the International Documentary Association. The film was even the first Egyptian film to be nominated for an Academy Award. While it received positive commentary abroad, at home its release was strictly controlled. It was made available on Netflix in January 2014, however the first showing in Egypt did not occur until June 2014 without any promotion.

== Publications ==
She worked on the production and editing team in number of films, including:

- The Square (2013) - Assistant Editor
- In the Last Days of the City (2016) - Assistant Editor
- Kiss me not (2017) - Assistant Editor
- About Her (2020) - Assistant Editor, Assistant Producer
- Daughters of Abdul-Rahman (2020) - Assistant Editor
