= General Authority for Health Insurance =

Egyptian Government Agency

The General Authority for Health Insurance is an Egyptian Government health agency.

Its total funds at the end of June 2022 amounted to US$2.9 billion and total revenues since the launch of the new system up to that point amounted to US$3.06 billion.
