= Laila Soueif =

Egyptian activist, mathematician, professor (born 1956)

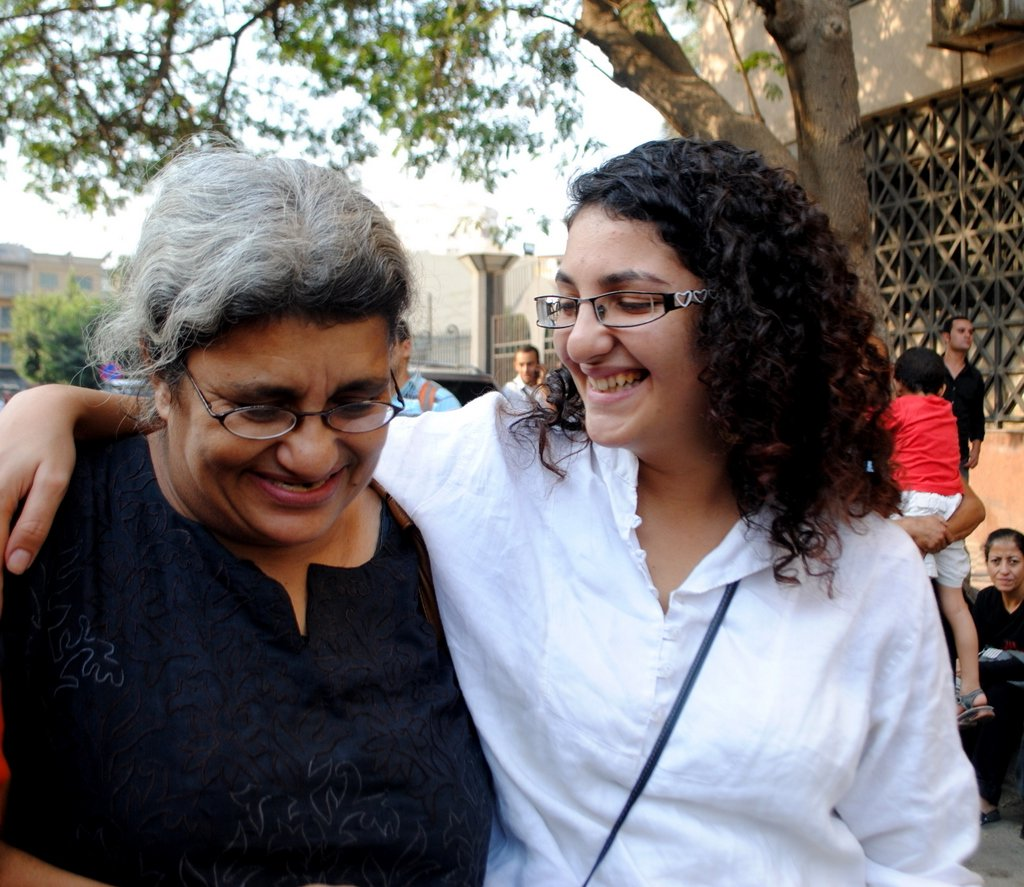
- Soueif with her daughter Mona Seif
- Born: 1956 (age 69–70); London, England, UK
- Education: Cairo University
- Occupations: Mathematician, academic, human and women's rights activist
- Spouse: Ahmed Seif El-Islam
- Children: Alaa Abd El-Fattah; Mona Seif; Sanaa Seif
- Relatives: Ahdaf Soueif (sister)

Laila Soueif (Arabic: ليلى سويف; born 1956) is an Egyptian-British human and women's rights activist and a professor of mathematics at Cairo University. She is the widow of Ahmed Seif El-Islam, and she is mother of activists: Alaa Abd El-Fattah, Sanaa Seif, and Mona Seif. Her sister is the novelist Ahdaf Soueif.

== Early life and education ==
Laila Soueif was born in London, England, in 1956, the daughter of a university professors. She went to her first political protest in 1972 in Cairo's Tahrir Square, when she was just 16. Two hours later her parents tracked her down and brought her home, and she has said: "From that, I learned that it was easier to defy the state than to defy my parents."

Soueif studied mathematics at Cairo University in the mid-1970s.

== Career ==
As of 2014, Soueif was a professor of mathematics at Cairo University.

She is the founder of the 9 March Professors' Movement for Universities Independence.

== Activism ==
In June 2014, Soueif's son, blogger and dissident Alaa Abd El-Fattah, along with 24 others, was sentenced in absentia to 5 years imprisonment, on counts of violating the new Protest Law. In October 2014, the Cairo Criminal Court sentenced her daughter Sanaa Seif and 22 others to three years in prison on similar charges. In early September 2014, Soueif and her daughter Mona Seif embarked on a hunger strike in protest against the imprisonment of Abd El-Fattah and Sanaa Seif. On 19 November, Soueif and Mona Seif ended their 76-day hunger strike.

=== Hunger strike demanding the release of her son ===
In December 2021, Abd El-Fattah was sent to prison in Egypt for spreading "false news undermining national security". On 30 September 2024, after Egyptian authorities did not release her son at the end of his sentence on 29 September 2024, but instead pushed the release date to 2027, the 68-year-old Laila went on a hunger strike from the day her son completed his sentence, to demand his release, asking the Egyptian and British governments to respect their own laws and obligations by holding near-weekly protests outside the UK government's Foreign Office in Westminster, calling on the UK government to do more to secure her son's release, chalking on the pavement the number of days of Alaa Abd El-Fattah's illegal imprisonment. She has been surviving on water, rehydration salts, and sugarless tea and coffee, and spends an hour each day outside 10 Downing Street. She was joined in mid-January 2025 by Australian journalist Peter Greste, who had been imprisoned in Egypt's Tora prison with Abd El-Fattah in 2013, for a 21-day hunger strike.

As of 26 February 2025, Soueif was warned by her doctor of her life being at high risk if she continued the hunger strike. She was admitted to a hospital in London with dangerously low blood sugar, blood pressure, and sodium levels. Her family urged UK Prime Minister Sir Keir Starmer to intervene and secure her son's release. Stopping taking the 300-calorie supplements she had been consuming for three months on a partial hunger, Soueif announced on 20 May that she had resumed her near-total hunger strike and her daily one-hour vigil outside Downing Street urging the UK government to do more to make her son's release a priority in relations with Egypt. In June 2025, it was confirmed that UK Prime Minister Sir Keir Starmer had been attempting to contact Egyptian President Abdel Fatah al-Sisi, but that Sisi had not returned their calls.

On 22 September 2025, Abd El-Fattah was freed from prison, having been pardoned along with five other prisoners by President Sisi.

== Personal life ==
Soueif met her future husband, Ahmed Seif El-Islam, in the mid-1970s while at Cairo University, where he was already the "leader of an underground communist student cell calling for revolution". They were married until his death in 2014.

Owing to her birth in the United Kingdom, Soueif holds both Egyptian and British citizenship.

They are the parents of the activists Alaa Abd El-Fattah, Sanaa Seif and Mona Seif. Her sister is the novelist Ahdaf Soueif.
