= Hisham Mubarak Law Center =

Egyptian law firm

Hisham Mubarak Law Center (HMLC) مركز هشام مبارك للقانون
- Headquarters: Downtown, Cairo (Egypt)
- Major practice areas: Human rights
- Date founded: 1999
- Website: Official website

The Hisham Mubarak Law Center (HMLC; مركز هشام مبارك للقانون) is an Egyptian law firm based in Cairo and Aswan which "works in the field of human rights through litigation, campaigns and legal research" and is "perhaps best known for its active support of torture victims and Egyptians subject to arbitrary detention." Founded by Ahmed Seif El-Islam and other human rights defenders in 1999 it has become a major player in Egyptian Human rights advocacy issues.

The centre was named after Hisham Mubarak (هشام مبارك) who was a distinguished Egyptian lawyer and human rights activist. He died in 1998 from a heart attack at age 35.

The Cairo office provides space for many activist groups including the Egyptian Center for Economic and Social Rights (ECESR) and is a hub and meeting space for various human rights and civil society groups in Egypt.

On 3 February, the tenth day of the 2011 Egyptian protests, military police raided the Cairo offices of the HMLC and the ECESR arresting 28 Egyptian and international human rights researchers, lawyers, and journalists including both directors, four members of the '6 April Youth' activist group including core member Amal Sharaf, Amnesty International staff and Dan Williams a Human Rights Watch researcher.

International pressure for their release was led by The Secretary General of Amnesty International Salil Shetty The International visitors were released around midnight on 4 February and the Egyptians on the morning of 5 February after being held without access to communication or legal advice.

By 2015, the centre was no longer functioning having endured harassment, threats and arrests by Egyptian State Security.

== Notable work and campaigns ==
2011 - Set up Emergency telephone numbers ahead of the planned 25 January demonstration so that they could dispatch lawyers to document Deaths, Injuries, and Arrests during the 2011 Egyptian protests Also provided meeting space for the April 6 Youth Movement who played a key part in organizing the protests.

2010 - Worked on the defence of Egyptian human rights activists Gamal Eid, director of the Arabic Network for Human Rights Information (ANHRI) and Ahmad Saif al-Islam, founder of Hisham Mubarak Law Centre (HMLC)

2009 - Campaigned against misuse of 'Hesba' court cases, on the grounds that the punishments "go beyond fines and imprisonment, and include manipulating marriages, revoking citizenships, and physical violence."

2008 - Defended Media student and blogger Mohammed Refaat of the blog "Matabbat" (Speedbumps) after he was arrested under the state emergency law for 'offending state institutions, destabilising public security and inciting demonstrations and strikes via the Internet'

Nov 2008 - Submitted an appeal against the original decision taken by the prosecutor general to prohibit any publicity in the case surrounding the murder of Suzan Tamim

May 2008 - Coordinated a defence campaign for limited-income citizens held in mass detentions for 'dissent'.

Jan 2008 - Supported the legal case for the Nadim Report and called for the prosecution of persons implicated in the report of torture.
