= Egyptian protest law =

The Egyptian protest law (act 107, year 2013) was signed into law on 24 November 2013 by former president Adly Mansour. The law requires three days notification before protesting; in addition, the Interior Ministry has the right to "cancel, postpone or move" the protest if it determines that protesters will "breach ... the law".

The April 6 Youth Movement, Tamarod and the Strong Egypt Party all criticized the law on the day it was passed. Former presidential candidate Khaled Ali challenged the protest law in court on 17 June 2014, though the case was adjourned until 21 October 2014. Though there were indications in early September 2014 that the protest law would be amended, this ultimately did not happen.

A group of female protesters, including some as young as 15, were sentenced to terms ranging from being held until they are 18 (in the case of the minors) to 11 years in prison (in the case of the older defendants). Human rights groups and other criticized the verdict. The minors were acquitted upon appeal, while the other female protesters were given a suspended sentence of one year. One of the founders of the April 6 Youth Movement, Ahmed Maher, joined a hunger strike held by other prisoners and their supporters to pressure authorities to abrogate the protest law and release prisoners.
