= Alaa Abd El-Fattah =

Egyptian writer and activist (born 1981)

- علاء عبد الفتاح
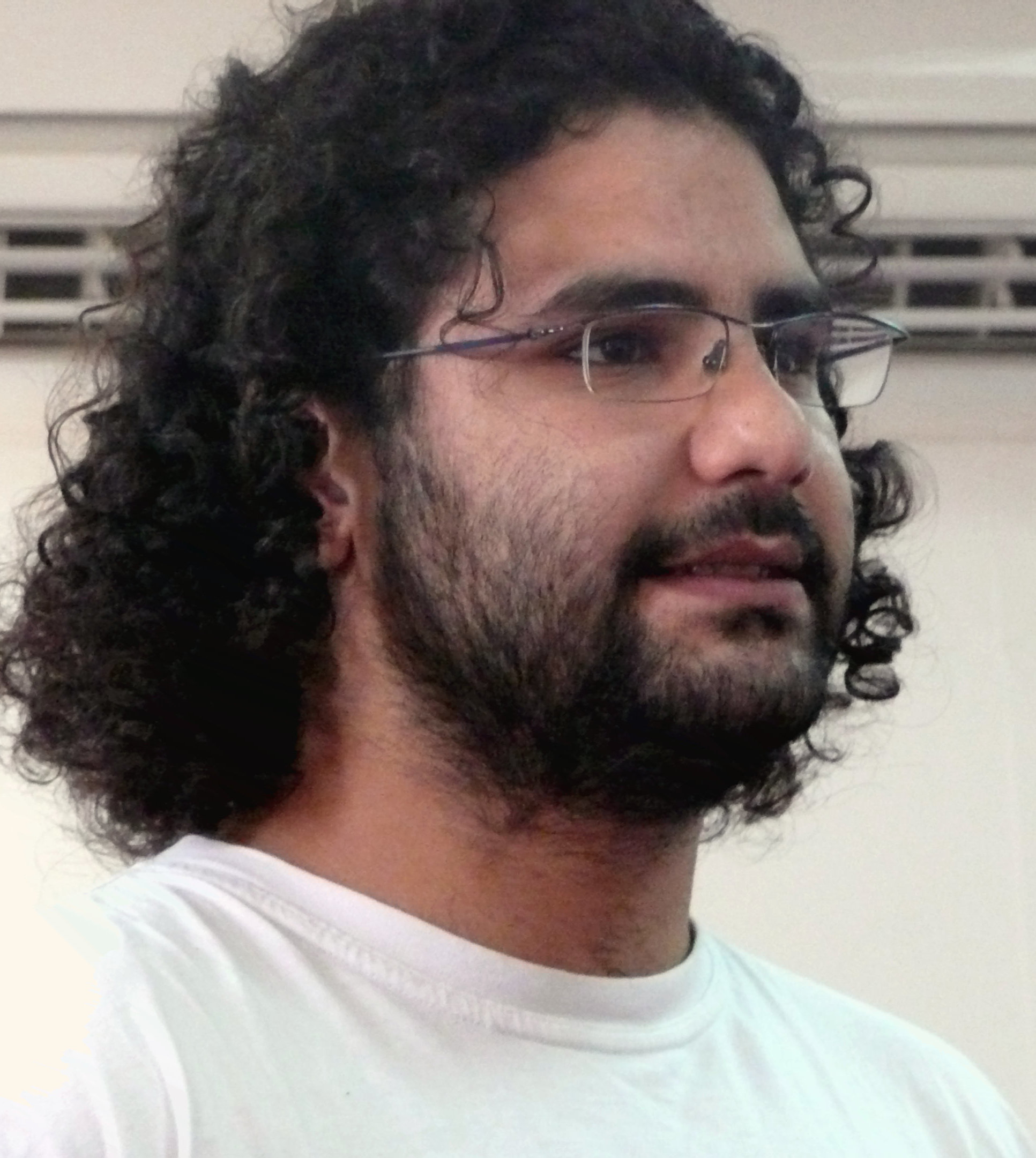
- Abd El-Fattah in 2008
- Born: علاء أحمد سيف إلاسلام عبد الفتاح; 1981 (age 44–45); Egypt
- Citizenship: Egyptian; British (since 2021)
- Notable work: You Have Not Yet Been Defeated (2021)
- Spouse: Manal Bahey al-Din Hassan
- Children: 1
- Parents: Ahmed Seif; Laila Soueif
- Relatives: Mona Seif (sister); Sanaa Seif (sister); Ahdaf Soueif (aunt)

Alaa Ahmed Seif al Islam Abd El-Fattah (Arabic: علاء أحمد سيف الإسلام عبد الفتاح, IPA: [ʕæˈlæːʔ ˈæħmæd ˈseːfalislæːm ʕæbdelfatˈtæːħ]), known professionally as Alaa Abd El-Fattah (Arabic: علاء عبد الفتاح; born 1981), is an Egyptian-British software developer, blogger, political activist and former political prisoner who was imprisoned by the Egyptian government for 12 years.

After a 2006 arrest by Egyptian police, Abd El-Fattah was released without charge 45 days later. He was imprisoned in Egypt for organising a political protest without requesting authorisation, and released on bail in March 2014. In September 2014, he was rearrested and ordered released on bail again, receiving a five-year sentence in February 2015, from which he was released in late March 2019. In September 2019, during the 2019 Egyptian protests, Abd El-Fattah was re-arrested by the National Security Agency and taken to State Security Prosecution on unknown charges. He was convicted of "spreading fake news" and jailed for five years. In April 2022, he began a hunger strike. His family claims that his sentence should have ended in September 2024. The Egyptian authorities refused to free him, as the release date had been appointed in January 2027, based on the court's decision not to include his served pretrial detention.

In September 2024, Abd El-Fattah's mother, Laila Soueif, began a hunger strike outside the British Foreign Office in London, remaining on strike as of 25 January 2025, when she was joined by Australian journalist Peter Greste. In October 2024, Abd El-Fattah was named by Arundhati Roy, winner of the 2024 PEN Pinter Prize awarded by English PEN, as the "Writer of Courage" with whom she chose to share the prize. The British Prime Minister Keir Starmer actively campaigned and lobbied for Abd El-Fattah's release and considered the case a "top priority" for his government.

On 22 September 2025, Abd El-Fattah was released from prison, after having spent most of the previous 12 years incarcerated. He was pardoned along with five other prisoners by Egyptian president Abdel Fattah el-Sisi. On 26 December, following the lifting of a travel ban, Abd El-Fattah moved to Britain, where he became the subject of controversy over his past social media posts, in which he called for the killing of members of the police, amongst others, and described himself as "racist".

== Early life and education ==
Alaa Ahmed Seif al Islam Abd El-Fattah was born in 1981 and raised in a family of well-known Egyptian activists. His father, Ahmed Seif El-Islam Hamad, a human rights attorney who had been arrested in 1983 by State Security Investigations Service officers and tortured and imprisoned for five years, is one of the founders of the Hisham Mubarak Law Center. His mother Laila Soueif, the sister of the novelist and political commentator Ahdaf Soueif, is a professor of mathematics at Cairo University and a political activist. His parents' activism began in the Anwar Sadat era.

During a demonstration in 2005, his mother and other women were attacked by Mubarak supporters; Abd El-Fattah protected her. One of his sisters is Mona Seif, a founding member of "No Military Trials for Civilians", a group raising awareness for the civilian detainees summoned by military prosecutors and investigating torture allegations involving military police. His other sister, Sanaa Seif, is an activist and film editor who co-founded a newspaper about the Arab spring called Gornal. He obtained British citizenship through his mother, Laila Soueif, in 2021.

== Software development and blogging ==
Abd El-Fattah has been active in developing Arabic-language versions of software and platforms.

Abd El-Fattah co-founded with his wife Manal Bahey El-Din Hassan (daughter of activist Bahi El-Din Hassan), the Egyptian blog aggregator Manalaa and Omraneya, which are the first Arabic-language blog aggregators that did not restrict inclusion based on the content of the blog. In 2005, the Manalaa blog won the Special Reporters Without Borders Award in Deutsche Welle's Best of Blogs competition.

== Political activism and arrests ==
Abd El-Fattah has been questioned, arrested, and detained on several occasions. He was arrested on 7 May 2006 when demonstrating for an independent judiciary, and was released on 20 June 2006. On 30 October 2011, he was arrested for inciting violence against the Egyptian National Police at the Maspero, and was released on 25 December 2011. On 26 March 2013, he was arrested for inciting aggression during a protest outside the Muslim Brotherhood's headquarters, known as the Mokattam Clashes of March 2013 but was later acquitted on all charges.

Two days later, on 28 March 2013, he was arrested and charged for torching former presidential candidate Ahmed Shafik's campaign headquarters on 28 May 2012, and received a suspended one-year jail term. On 28 November 2013, he was arrested for rallying, inciting violence, resisting authorities and violating the Anti-protest Law after a demonstration against military trials for civilians outside Shura Council building on 26 November 2013.

He was initially released on 23 March 2014, after 115 days in detention. In June 2014, he was sentenced in absentia to 15 years in prison and detained again awaiting his retrial, during which time he went on a hunger strike. He was rearrested on 15 September 2014, and released on bail.

In October 2021, a collection of his writings – some smuggled out from his prison cell – translated into English by anonymous supporters, was published by Fitzcarraldo Editions under the title You Have Not Yet Been Defeated, with a foreword by Naomi Klein. Drawing on a decade of Abd El-Fattah's essays, newspaper columns, letters, article-length Facebook posts and tweets, the book "offers a kaleidoscopic view of his thoughts and interests ... all part of his effort to envision what a sustainable and equitable society, built on the strong foundations of a shared democratic culture, might look like."

Among positive reviews, that in Jacobin magazine noted: "These essays are necessary reading for anyone who wishes to understand the last decade of Egyptian politics." The Nation commented: "Alaa's writings suggest that some of the most radical ideas of our times are produced outside universities and that some of the most significant thinkers of our age are not academics."

In July 2022, an Arabic translation of Abd El-Fattah's book was published by Jusur, a Lebanese publishing house based in Beirut, under the title Shabah' Al-Rabea'.

During his two-month detention in 2011, his son Khaled was born, and during his three-month detention in 2014, his father Ahmed Seif El-Islam Hamad died.

=== 2006 arrest ===
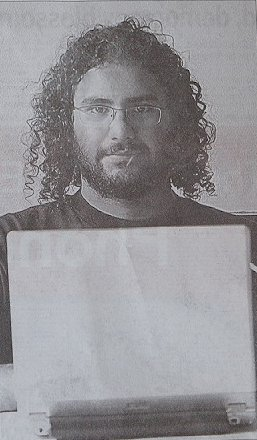
A picture of Abd El-Fattah in 2006 used by activists demanding his release

On 7 May 2006, Abd El-Fattah was arrested during a peaceful protest after he called for an independent judiciary. His arrest, along with that of several other bloggers and activists, spurred solidarity protests by others around the world. Abd El-Fattah was released on 20 June 2006, after spending 45 days in prison. His wife Manal was quoted by the London Independent newspaper as saying: "There's no going back now, we'll definitely be continuing our activities."

=== 2011 Egyptian revolution and arrest ===
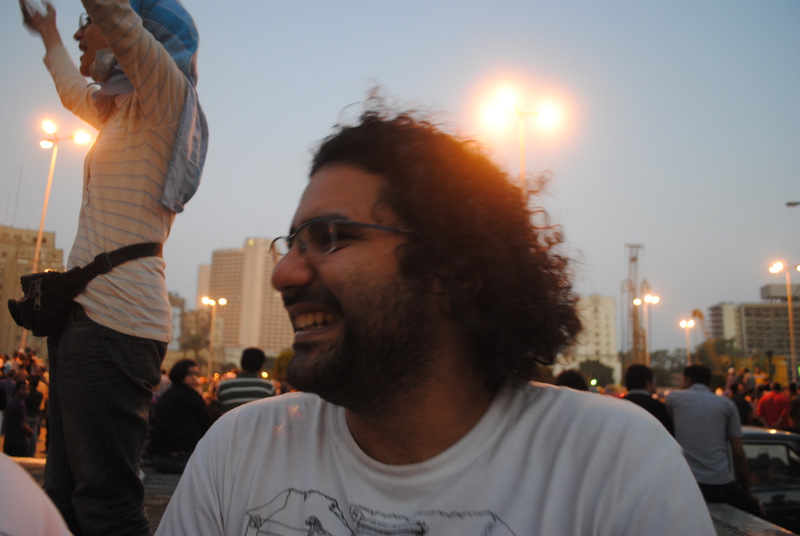
Abd El-Fattah in Tahrir Square, 2011

According to Egyptian newspaper al-Ahram Weekly, Abd el-Fattah's name "is in many ways synonymous with Egypt's 25 January Revolution". Abd El-Fattah participated in nearly every demonstration after the revolution began. He was not in Egypt on 25 January 2011, when the anti-regime protests began and when the Egyptian government shut down the internet in the country. However, he was able to collect information from family and friends by land-line phones and published to the outside world the events occurring in Egypt during the first days of the revolution.

A few days later, he returned to Egypt and was in Tahrir Square, the epicenter of the protests, on 2 February. While demonstrating there, he participated in defending the square from attacks by security forces and pro-regime assailants, an event known in Egypt as the "camel battle".

Abd El-Fattah continued his participation in the Egyptian revolution, until Mubarak stepped down from the presidency. Abd El-Fattah thereafter settled in Egypt, where he maintained his participation in the demonstrations against the Supreme Council of the Armed Forces' (SCAF) way of running the country after Mubarak's fall.

On 30 October, Abd El-Fattah was arrested on charges of inciting violence against the military during the 9 October Maspero demonstrations, during which hundreds of people were injured and 27 died in the worst violence since Mubarak left office. Abd El-Fattah refused to recognise the legitimacy of his interrogators or answer their questions and was then to be held for 15 days, a period that indefinitely renewable. He was accused of having incited fighting in Maspero, of assaulting soldiers and damaging military property.

As in his 2006 imprisonment, his mother spoke out in his support, and initiated a hunger strike in opposition to the court-martialling of civilians on 6 November. His father and sisters also participated in the 2011 protests. At his first hearing, Abd El-Fattah's father, the human rights attorney Ahmed Seif El-Islam, presented the military court with video tapes, one of which contained footage of armored personnel carriers running over protesters and another of state television anchors "inciting violence". He also accused the head of military police of being directly responsible for the violence and accused the Supreme Council of Armed Forces of obstruction of justice for instituting a curfew the night of the attack in order to "hide all the evidence of the army's crimes".

The spokesman for the United Nations High Commissioner for Human Rights called for the release of Abd El-Fattah and all others imprisoned for exercising free speech, while Amnesty International issued a condemnation of his imprisonment and accusing SCAF of involvement in the Maspero clashes. In reaction to his imprisonment, thousands of protesters took part in demonstrations in Cairo and Alexandria, demanding Abd El-Fattah's release. Human rights activists and bloggers outside of Egypt have also called for his release. While incarcerated in the Bab al-Khalq Prison, he wrote a letter to fellow Egyptian activists, claiming that SCAF had "hijacked" the revolution. He also compared his current imprisonment with the prison time he served in 2006, saying: "I never expected to repeat the experience of five years ago. After a revolution that deposed the tyrant, I go back to his jails?"

Following protests against Abd El-Fattah's incarceration, military authorities allowed his case to be handled by a civilian court instead of military tribunal. On 13 December, the court dropped two charges against him, including incitement and illegal assembly. The court extended his detention for another 15 days and maintained the charges of stealing weapons and shooting at soldiers. While Abd El-Fattah remained in custody, his son Khaled was born, named after Khaled Said, the slain blogger who had become a symbol of the Egyptian revolution.

On 25 December 2011, a judge representing the public prosecutor's office ordered the release of Abd El-Fattah to take place the following day. He remained under a travel ban.

=== 2013 arrest ===
In November 2013, Abd El-Fattah was arrested again for allegedly encouraging a demonstration against the new constitution outside the Egyptian Parliament, violating the new protest law. Around 20 policemen raided Abd El-Fattah's home, broke the door down, and proceeded to confiscate the family's computers and mobile phones. When Abd El-Fattah asked to see the arrest warrant, the police physically assaulted him and his wife.

In June 2014, Abd El-Fattah, along with 24 others, was sentenced in absentia to 15 years imprisonment, on counts of violating the new Protest Law. In October 2014, the Cairo Criminal Court sentenced his sister Sanaa Seif and 22 others to three years in prison on similar charges. In early September 2014, his mother Laila Soueif and sister Mona Seif embarked on a hunger strike in protest against the imprisonment of the siblings. On 19 November, Soueif and Mona Seif ended their 76-day hunger strike.

On 23 February 2015, Abd El-Fattah was sentenced to five years in prison. He was released on 29 March 2019, but remained subject to a five-year parole period, requiring him to stay at a police station for 12 hours daily, from evening until morning.

=== 2019 arrest ===
On 29 September 2019, during the 2019 Egyptian protests, Abd El-Fattah was arrested by the National Security Agency and taken to State Security Prosecution on charges that were unknown. Abd El-Fattah's family released a statement to announce that he was kidnapped after leaving the Dokki police station. Since his release in March 2019, Abd El-Fattah had been required to follow daily police probation of 12 hours per day in the Dokki police station for five years. He was tortured by a "welcome parade" in Tora Prison.

=== 2021 sentencing and urgent appeal to UN Working Group ===
Abd El-Fattah was convicted and sentenced to five years of imprisonment for spreading "false news undermining national security" in December 2021, while lawyers Mohamed El-Baqer and blogger Mohamed "Oxygen" Ibrahim were sentenced to four years each, according to Abdel Fattah's sister Mona Seif.

During his detention, at Tora Prison, Abd El-Fattah became a British citizen, through his British-born mother. On 2 April 2022, he began a hunger strike in protest at being kept in solitary confinement, and refused access to books, and the opportunity to exercise, demanding to be allowed a visit by United Kingdom consular staff. As of 2 May 2022, his hunger strike continued, he had received no medical attention despite losing weight and becoming "very weak", and had said his farewells to his family.

On 18 May 2022, 10 MPs and 17 members of the House of Lords urged the UK government to take action to help Alaa Abd El-Fattah. In a letter to foreign secretary Liz Truss, they stated that Abd El-Fattah was being held in "inhumane" conditions. It also mentioned that the British Embassy in Egypt had been requesting consular access to Abd El-Fattah, but this was denied by the Egyptian authorities. Lord Simon McDonald, former Permanent Under-Secretary of State for Foreign Affairs and Head of the Diplomatic Service, said that because of the international law on multiple citizenship Egypt does not have to recognise Abd El-Fattah's British citizenship while he is in Egypt, where he holds citizenship.

On 14 June 2022, at least 25 celebrities and political thinkers from across the world urged the British foreign secretary Liz Truss to help secure the release of Abd el-Fattah. Mark Ruffalo, Judi Dench, Stephen Fry, and Carey Mulligan were among the celebrities who penned the letter calling on the United Kingdom to condemn his prolonged detention in Egypt. His family feared that he might die after weeks on just water and Rehydration salts. His sister, Sanaa Seif, also urged Truss to publicly demand that the activist be released, as he was convinced that he would not leave the Egyptian prison alive.

On 6 November 2022, as Egypt hosted world leaders for the COP27 summit, Abdel Fattah stopped drinking water, after more than six months of a hunger strike. His sister Sanaa Seif raised concerns that he might die within days, and hoped that PM Rishi Sunak would secure Abdel Fattah's release during his visit to Egypt for COP27. Seif also spoke about her fears that the Egyptian authorities might be torturing Abdel Fattah and force-feeding him behind the closed doors. She asked for a proof of life of her brother. The UN human rights chief Volker Türk also called on Egypt to immediately release Abdel Fattah.

On 10 November, prison officials told Abdel Fattah's family that he had received "medical intervention with the knowledge of a judicial authority", indicative of either force-feeding or intravenous rehydration. On 15 November, his family received a letter from him saying he had ended his hunger strike and he would explain why at their next visit.

On 23 November 2022, 67 French parliamentarians called on European authorities and governments, to intervene for Abd El-Fattah's immediate release, and to transport him on a European plane to a country of his choice, due to the deterioration of his health in Egyptian prison and the possibility of his re-arrest.

Abd El-Fattah's sister, Sana Seif, approached Europe and the United Nations to push for the release of her brother. She also called for the UNHRC to investigate into the imprisonment of her brother and other political prisoners in Egypt. Seif re-started the #FreeAlaa campaign, saying that international pressure was required. On 16 March 2023, the Geneva Ministry of Foreign Affairs confirmed that Germany had exchanged its views on these initiatives with Seif in Geneva. On 14 November 2023, Abd El-Fattah's family instructed an international counsel team led by Can Yeğinsu to file an urgent appeal with the UN Working Group on Arbitrary Detention.

=== 2024 extension of sentence ===
Based on the sentencing, Abd El-Fattah was supposed to be released on 29 September 2024, but the Egyptian authorities decided not to include his pre-trial detention, pushing the release date to 2027.

On 30 September 2024, his mother Laila Soueif began a daily hunger strike outside the UK government's Foreign Office in Westminster, chalking on the pavement the number of days of her son's illegal imprisonment. Surviving on water, rehydration salts, and sugarless tea and coffee, she spent an hour each day outside 10 Downing Street. She was joined in mid-January 2025 by Australian journalist Peter Greste, who had been imprisoned in Egypt with Abd El-Fattah in 2013, for a 21-day hunger strike.

In February 2025, Laila Soueif was hospitalised as the result of a dangerous fall in her blood-sugar levels, and a member of her family was reported as saying: "It seems extraordinary that the whole of the British government machine is unable to secure a call [with the Egyptian president]. Laila has always said her fast is about securing some sign of progress in the release of her son, but so far she has nothing and feels she cannot stop her hunger strike." In March 2025, Alaa Abd El-Fattah began a second phase of his hunger strike, after learning that his mother had been hospitalized in London.

=== 2025 UN Working Group decision and release ===
On 13 June 2025, the UN Working Group on Arbitrary Detention handed down its opinion, finding Abd El-Fattah's detention to arbitrary in violation of Articles 2, 3, 7, 10, 11 and 19 of the Universal Declaration of Human Rights and Articles 2, 9, 10, 14, 19 and 26 of the International Covenant on Civil and Political Rights. On 9 September 2025, president Abdel Fattah el-Sisi ordered a review of the National Council for Human Rights' petition for pardon, with Abd El-Fattah included in the list of seven proposed to be reviewed. The president formally pardoned Abd El-Fattah on 22 September, and it was reported on 23 September that Abd El-Fattah had been released from Wadi el-Natrun Prison and was at his home in Cairo.

=== 2025 move to the United Kingdom and social media controversy ===
In November 2025, Abd El-Fattah attempted to fly to London with his sister Sanaa but was told by officials at Cairo International Airport that he was not allowed to travel. The following month, the travel ban was lifted. On 26 December, it was announced that Abd El-Fattah had arrived in the UK and had been reunited with his family.

Following Abd El-Fattah's arrival to the United Kingdom in December 2025, controversy emerged over his earlier posts on X (formerly Twitter). El-Fattah wrote "I'm telling you that I hate white people" and referred to British people as "dogs and monkeys". On 3 July 2010, he expressed support for killing "any colonialists and specially zionists", referring to such acts as "heroic". On 10 September 2010, he posted that "there was no genocide against Jews by the Nazis – after all, many Jews are left". On 3 November 2010, he referred to himself as "a violent person who advocated the killing of all Zionists including civilians". On 8 August 2011, during riots in England, he wrote "Now my real criticism of these post-police murder riots is the wrong focus, go burn the City or Downing Street, or hunt police fools". He also wrote in the same year that "police are not human" and "don't have rights, we should just kill them all". In 2012 he posted: "I am a racist, I don't like white people."

After these posts emerged, the Shadow Justice Secretary, Robert Jenrick wrote to the Prime Minister criticising the government's public welcome of Abd El-Fattah's return to the United Kingdom. Jenrick called on the Prime Minister to condemn the statements and clarify that the government did not legitimise calls for violence.

A Foreign Office spokesperson in the UK said that "The government condemns Mr el-Fattah's historic[al] tweets and considers them to be abhorrent". The Conservative Party while in government had also acted on behalf of Abd El-Fattah, including his granting of citizenship in 2021, and MPs Iain Duncan Smith and Alicia Kearns said that they regretted that support. Chris Philp, who was immigration minister when Abd El-Fattah was given citizenship, said that he was unaware of the tweets at the time and that El-Fattah should be denaturalised and deported. Conservative leader Kemi Badenoch and Nigel Farage of Reform UK also called for his deportation.

Abd El-Fattah wrote "Looking at the tweets now – the ones that were not completely twisted out of their meaning – I do understand how shocking and hurtful they are, and for that I unequivocally apologise". He said that tweets allegedly showing homophobia and Holocaust denial were satires of such attitudes, and that he had fought for Egypt's LGBT and religious minority communities. The Government considered his apology "fairly fulsome".

On 29 December, Starmer said that Abd El-Fattah's tweets would have "added to the distress of many in the Jewish community in the UK". Foreign Secretary Yvette Cooper announced a review of "serious information failures" and said that she, Starmer and David Lammy had been unaware of the tweets.

== Recognition and awards ==
In September 2014, Abd El-Fattah was nominated by European United Left–Nordic Green Left for the Sakharov Prize, along with the Tunisian rapper Weld El 15 and the Moroccan rapper L7a9d. The following month, the nomination was withdrawn after controversy over some 2012 tweets by Abd El-Fattah at the time of Israel's bombing of Gaza where he wrote that "there is a critical number of Israelis that we need to kill and then the problem is solved" and that "...Israel must come to an end." He complained that the tweets had been taken out of context.

In 2022, Australian journalist Peter Greste, who had been imprisoned with Abd El-Fattah for several months in 2014, described him as "easily the best-known political prisoner in Egypt today". Greste cited Abd El-Fattah's collection of writings entitled You Have Not Yet Been Defeated as especially meaningful to him because Abd El-Fattah had helped him understand their predicament, and given him the psychological tools to survive what they went through.

On 10 October 2024, while still imprisoned, Abd El-Fattah was named by Arundhati Roy, winner of the 2024 PEN Pinter Prize awarded by English PEN, as the international "writer of courage" with whom she had chosen to share the prize, as announced at a ceremony at the British Library. An appreciation of both writers was delivered by Naomi Klein, and Lina Attalah, editor-in-chief of independent online Egyptian newspaper Mada Masr, accepted the award on Abd El-Fattah's behalf.

== In film ==
Abd El-Fattah is played by Australian actor Mojean Aria in the 2024 feature film The Correspondent.

== Personal life ==
Abd El-Fattah married activist and blogger Manal Bahey al-Din Hassan. He missed the birth of his first child while detained in December 2011. They were no longer married by mid-2024.

His usual place of residence is Giza.

== Bibliography ==
- You Have Not Yet Been Defeated. Seven Stories Press. 2021. ISBN 9781644212455.

== See also ==
- Asmaa Mahfouz
- George Ishak
- Wael Ghonim
- Hossam el-Hamalawy
