= Ahdaf Soueif =

Egyptian novelist (born 1950)

- أهداف سويف
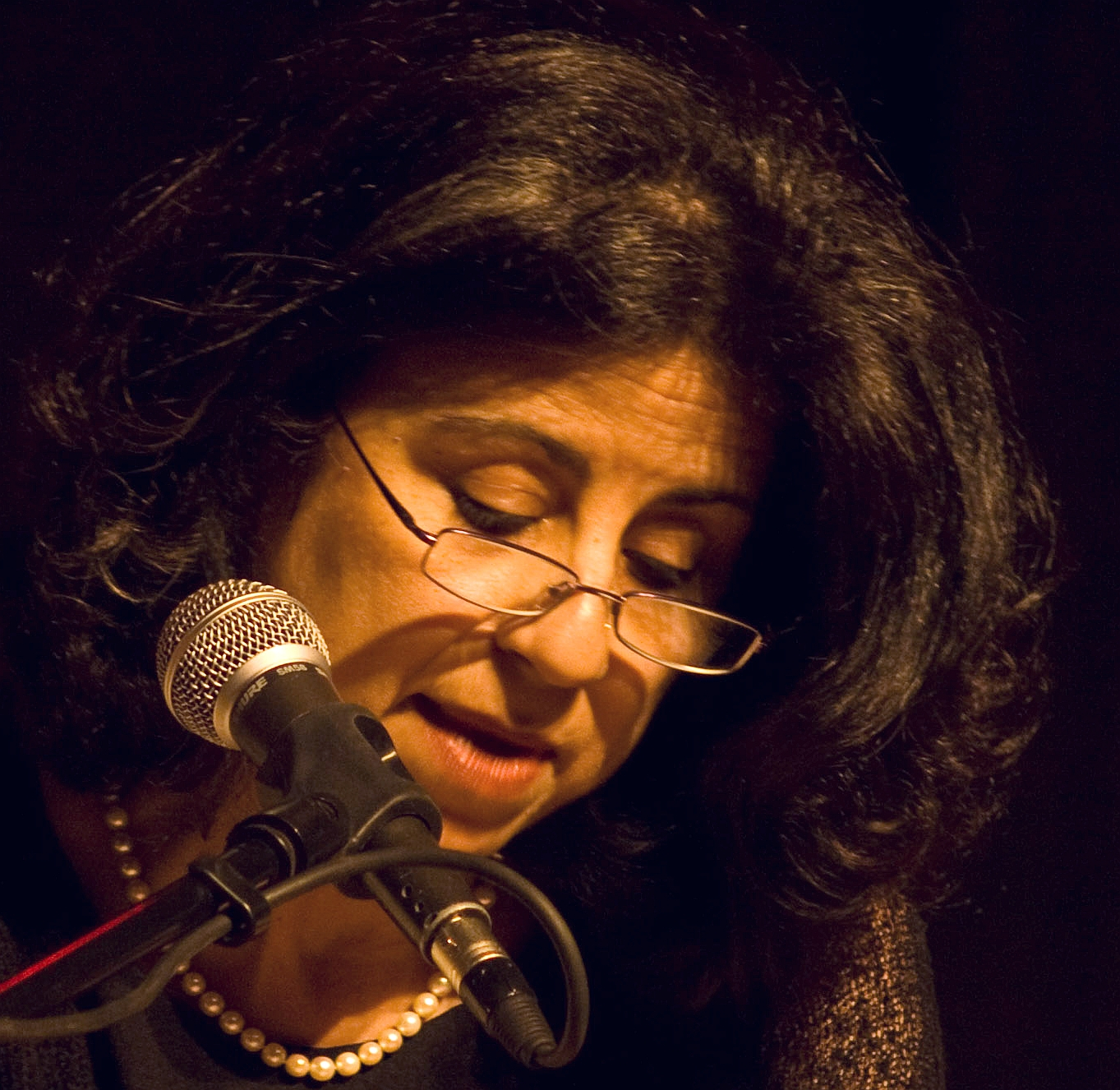
- Soueif in 2008
- Born: 23 March 1950 (age 76); Cairo, Egypt
- Education: University of Lancaster
- Notable work: The Map of Love (1999)
- Spouse: Ian Hamilton
- Children: 2
- Relatives: Laila Soueif (sister); Alaa Abd El-Fattah (nephew); Mona Seif (niece); Sanaa Seif (niece)
- Website: www.ahdafsoueif.com

Ahdaf Soueif (Arabic: أهداف سويف; born 23 March 1950) is an Egyptian novelist and political and cultural commentator.

== Early life ==
Soueif was born in Cairo, where she lives, and was educated in Egypt and England. She studied for a PhD in linguistics at the University of Lancaster, completing the degree in 1979. Her sister is the human and women's rights activist and mathematician Laila Soueif.

== Career ==
Ahdaf Soueif's debut novel, In the Eye of the Sun (1993), set in Egypt and England, recounts the maturing of Asya, a beautiful Egyptian woman who, by her own admission, "feels more comfortable with art than with life". Soueif's second novel, The Map of Love (1999), was shortlisted for the Booker Prize, has been translated into 21 languages and sold more than a million copies. She has also published two books of short stories, Aisha (1983) and Sandpiper (1996) – a selection from which was combined in the collection I Think Of You in 2007, and Stories Of Ourselves in 2010.

Soueif writes primarily in English, but her Arabic-speaking readers say they can hear the Arabic through the English. She translated Mourid Barghouti's I Saw Ramallah (with a foreword by Edward Said) from Arabic into English.

Along with her readings of Egyptian history and politics, Soueif also writes about Palestinians in her fiction and non-fiction. A shorter version of Under the Gun: A Palestinian Journey was originally published in The Guardian and then printed in full in Soueif's 2004 collection of essays, Mezzaterra: Fragments from the Common Ground, and she wrote the introduction to the New York Review Books 2003 reprint of Jean Genet's Prisoner of Love.

She was elected a Fellow of the Royal Society of Literature in 2002.

In 2008, she initiated the first Palestine Festival of Literature, of which she is the Founding Chair.

Soueif is also a cultural and political commentator for The Guardian newspaper, and she has reported on the Egyptian revolution. In January 2012, she published Cairo: My City, Our Revolution – a personal account of the first year of the Egyptian revolution. Her sister Laila Soueif, and Laila's children, Alaa Abd El-Fatah and Mona Seif, are also activists.

Soueif was married to Ian Hamilton, with whom she had two sons: Omar Robert Hamilton and Ismail Richard Hamilton.

She was appointed a trustee of the British Museum in 2012 and re-appointed for a further four years in 2016. However she resigned in 2019 complaining about BP's sponsorship, the reluctance to re-hire workers transferred to Carillion and lack of engagement with repatriating artworks.

In June 2013, Soueif and numerous other celebrities appeared in a video showing support for activist and whistleblower Chelsea Manning.

== Political views ==
In December 2019, along with 42 other leading cultural figures, Soueif signed a letter endorsing the Labour Party under Jeremy Corbyn's leadership in the 2019 general election. The letter stated that "Labour's election manifesto under Jeremy Corbyn's leadership offers a transformative plan that prioritises the needs of people and the planet over private profit and the vested interests of a few."

In 2020, Soueif was arrested for demanding the release of political prisoners during the COVID-19 pandemic in Egypt.

== Bibliography ==
- Aisha, London: Bloomsbury, 1983.
- In the Eye of the Sun, NY: Random House, 1992.
- Sandpiper, London: Bloomsbury, 1996.
- The Map of Love, London: Bloomsbury, 1999.
- Translation of I Saw Ramallah by Mourid Barghouti. NY: Anchor Books, 2003.
- Mezzaterra: Fragments from the Common Ground, NY: Anchor Books, 2004.
- I Think of You, London: Bloomsbury: 2007.
- Reflections on Islamic Art, Bloomsbury-Qatar Foundation, 2011. Museum of Islamic Art (Dawḥah, Qatar). Hardback English 978-9992-142-60-8 Hardback Arabic 978-9992-142-61-5. Paperback English 978-9992-142-80-6 Paperback Arabic 978-9992-142-79-0
- Cairo: My City, Our Revolution, Bloomsbury, 2012
- This Is Not a Border: Reportage & Reflection from the Palestine Festival of Literature, Bloomsbury, 2017.

== Literary awards ==
In a review of Egyptian novelists, Harper's Magazine included Soueif in a shortlist of "the country's most talented writers". She has also been the recipient of several literary awards:

- 1996: Cairo International Book Fair: Best Collection of Short Stories (Sandpiper)
- 1999: Nominated: the Booker Prize ("The Map of Love")
- 2010: Inaugural Mahmoud Darwish Award
- 2011: Cavafy Award
- 2011: Named in The Guardian′s Books Power 100
- 2011: Reflections: (English edition)

== Literary criticism ==
Marta Cariello: "Bodies Across: Ahdaf Soueif, Fadia Faqir, Diana Abu Jaber" in Al Maleh, Layla (ed.), Arab Voices in Diaspora. Critical Perspectives on Anglophone Arab Literature. Amsterdam/New York, NY, 2009, Hb: ISBN 978-90-420-2718-3

Chakravorty, Mrinalini. "To Undo What the North Has Done: Fragments of a Nation and Arab Collectivism in the Fiction of Ahdaf Soueif". In Arab Women's Lives Retold: Exploring Identity Through Writing, edited by Nawar Al-Hassan Golley, 129–154. Syracuse: Syracuse University Press, 2007. ISBN 9780815631477
