= Egypt–Qatar relations =

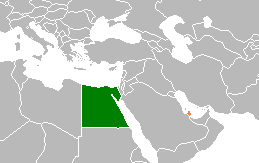

- Egypt: Qatar

Egypt–Qatar relations are the bilateral relations between the Arab Republic of Egypt and the State of Qatar. They first began in 1972.

== Diplomatic representation ==
By January 1973, just two years after Qatar gained its independence, Egypt was among the eighteen countries that Qatar appointed an ambassador to.

== Political disputes ==
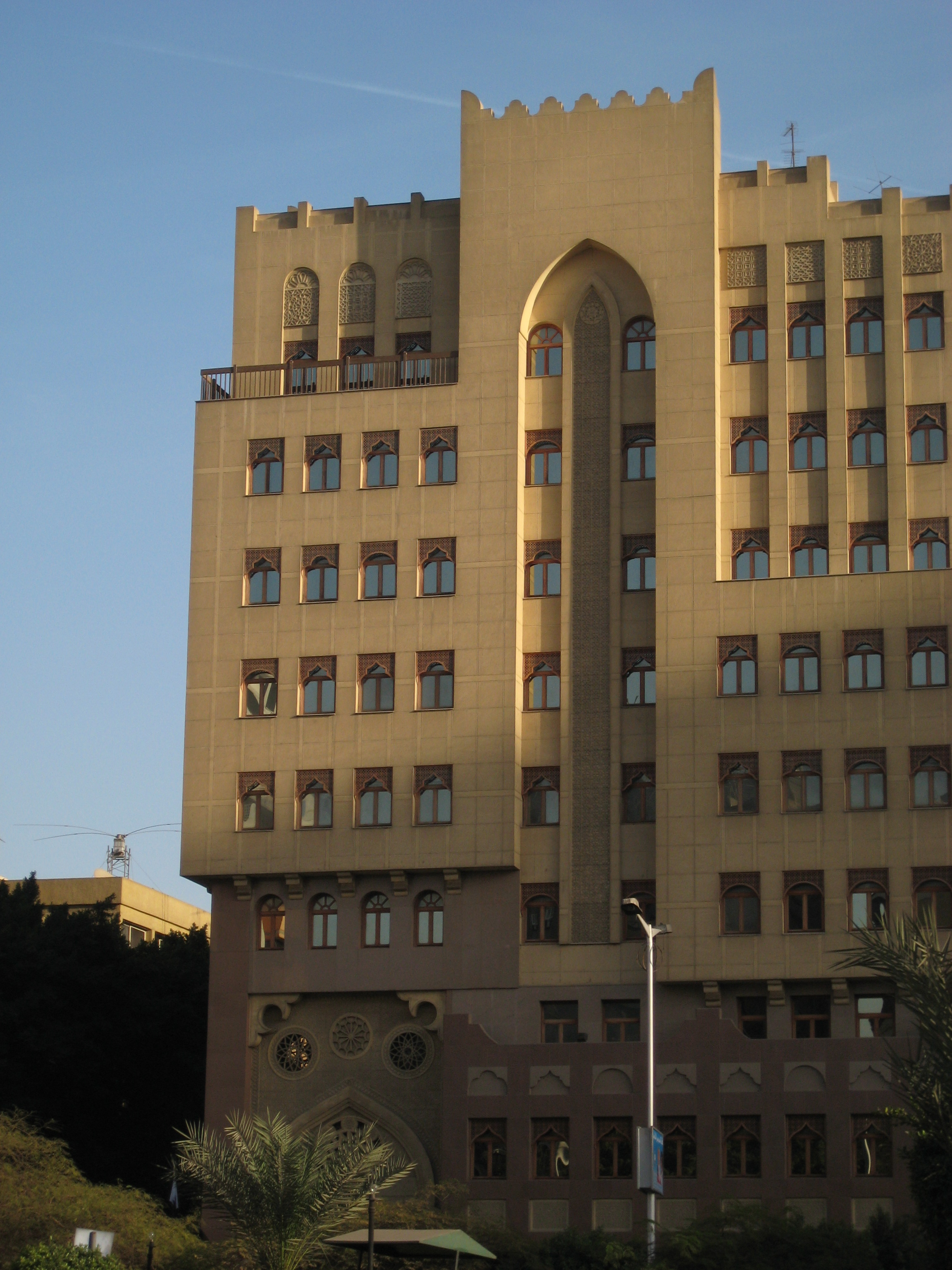
The Qatari Embassy in Egypt's Mohandessin neighborhood

Egypt boycotted the MEMA Conference in Qatar in 1997 after asserting that Qatar was financing Islamic militant organizations in Egypt. They also accused Qatar's media of harboring an anti-Egypt agenda. The conflict was mediated by Saudi Arabia later that year, but weeks after the intervention, Qatari authorities laid off 700 Egyptian workers in private and public sectors. During the conference, the Qatari foreign minister accused Egypt of supporting the 'plotters', referring to the 110 individuals tried over the February 1996 counter-coup attempt against emir Hamad bin Khalifa Al Thani. Qatar began denying entry visas to Egyptian citizens and authorities reportedly harassed Egyptian laborers.

=== Strained relations in the post-Morsi era (2013–2021) ===
Following mass protests in 2013 against the Qatar-backed Islamist Egyptian president Mohamed Morsi, in July of that year he was removed from office. This led to an increase in tensions between Qatar and Egypt, with a number of Arab states backing Egypt in this dispute. Qatar was chastized by several Arab states for its harboring of Yusuf al-Qaradawi, a Muslim cleric who was alleged to have had a prominent role within the intellectual leadership of the Muslim Brotherhood.

In March 2014, three Arab states removed their ambassadors from Qatar in protest of alleged interference by Qatar in their internal affairs, which included financially supporting the Muslim Brotherhood in Egypt. Around December 2014, Qatar moved to mend relations with Egypt amid pressure from other Persian Gulf countries, primarily Saudi Arabia.

In February 2015, a month after the death of Abdullah of Saudi Arabia, another rift in relations emerged after Egypt conducted an airstrike over an ISIL bastion in Libya following the beheading of Egyptian Copts. The airstrikes were condemned by the Qatari media outlet Al Jazeera, which broadcast images depicting what appeared to be civilian victims. Additionally, Qatar's foreign ministry expressed reservations over the airstrikes. This prompted Tariq Adel, Egypt's delegate to the Arab League, to accuse Qatar of supporting terrorism. Egyptian citizens also launched an online campaign denouncing Qatar. The GCC rejected Egypt's accusations and its secretary general regarded the statements to be false. Shortly afterward, Qatar recalled its ambassador to Egypt for consultations.

==== 2017 diplomatic crisis ====
On 5 June 2017, the government of Egypt, along with those of Saudi Arabia, Bahrain, and the United Arab Emirates, announced the severance of their diplomatic relations with Qatar. The Egyptian Foreign Ministry announced it was closing its operations to Qatari transportation. The Egyptian, Saudi, Bahraini, and Emirati governments cited Qatar's continuing alleged support for terrorism, such as the Muslim Brotherhood. The Muslim Brotherhood in Egypt is banned by the government and considered a terrorist organization. Islam Hassan argues "Egypt has had troubled relations with Qatar for many years, except during the presidential period of Mohamed Morsi. The Egyptian government has seen Qatar as a source of instability. The Egyptian regime also sees that Qatar challenges its rule by financing the Muslim Brotherhood, and other organizations, which the regime has outlawed and consider terrorist organizations. Thus, the Egyptian regime has been trying to resist Qatar by any means. The current issue between the Saudi bloc and Qatar seemed to be an opportunity to put pressure on Qatar to stop financing the Muslim Brotherhood, its affiliates, and supporters, and to support the Sisi regime." To move closer to the Gulf states, Qatar expelled dozens of Muslim Brotherhood leaders of the first and second class, headed by leader Essam Talima, and leader Mahmoud Hussein, who continued to lead the Brotherhood from Turkey, leaving the Muslim Brotherhood with less regional and international backing.

=== Resumption of diplomatic relations (2021–present) ===
On 20 January 2021, Egypt agreed to resume diplomatic relations with Qatar, making it the first country to officially do so under an Arab deal to end the dispute. In June 2021, Amr Kamal Eddin al-Sherbiny was appointed the Egyptian ambassador to Qatar. In July 2021, Salem Mubarak Al Shafi was appointed the Qatari ambassador to Egypt.

On 24 June 2022, Qatar's Emir Tamim bin Hamad Al Thani met with Egyptian President Abdel Fattah el-Sisi in Cairo on his first official visit to Egypt since 2015. They discussed diplomatic and economic relations after Qatar and Egypt had signed investments contracts worth more than US$5 billion in March 2022.

Within Qatar itself, there still exists continuing retaliation to Egyptians since 2017. Egyptians are not allowed to obtain resident status in the country due to a block in place on Egyptians by the Qatari Ministry of Interior. This issue extends to Egyptians being issued work visas, family visas, or other visas into Qatar that would allow them to apply for resident status, resulting in multiple cases of family separation or leaving the country. While the Qatari Government denies these allegations, in 2019 the country’s secretary-general of the National Tourism Council, Akbar al-Baker, described the Egyptian people as "enemies", this being one of very few times an official has discussed the issue of retaliation against Egyptians.

== Al Jazeera ==
In the early years after Al Jazeera's formation in 1996, it was often involved in criticism of then-President Hosni Mubarak, which prompted retaliation from Mubarak and the Egyptian media. In 1997, Egypt sent the head of its intelligence agency, Omar Suleiman, to respond to the news network's criticism of the Egyptian government. In an interview in 2002, Mubarak blamed Al Jazeera for "spreading friction, enmity and instability among Arab countries". A US diplomatic cable leaked from 2010 revealed that Hamad bin Jassim Al Thani told US senator John Kerry that he made an offer to Mubarak in which he would "stop Al Jazeera for a year" if Egypt agreed to deliver a lasting settlement to the Palestinians during that period.

The Muslim Brotherhood-affiliated Egyptian president Mohamed Morsi, who briefly ruled Egypt from 2012 to 2013, was removed from office in mid-2013 following mass protests against his rule, and the Egyptian authorities soon afterward cracked down on the Muslim Brotherhood and media outlets closely linked to it—including Al Jazeera, which provided several prominent Muslim Brotherhood spokesmen with media platforms. This culminated in the arrests of Al Jazeera journalists Mohamed Fahmy, Peter Greste and Baher Ghorab in December 2013. Al Jazeera ceased broadcasts of its Egyptian channel Mubasher Misr in December 2014 following accusations that the network was "damaging national security and unity".

In December 2016, Mahmoud Hussein, an Egyptian journalist working for Al Jazeera, was arrested and later held in prison without being charged or going through trial. He was accused of "incitement against state institutions broadcasting false news with the aim of spreading chaos", charges which were denied by Hussein and Al Jazeera, the latter of which called for his release. He was released on 6 February 2021.

In September 2022, Al Jazeera journalist Ahmed al-Najdi was released after spending two years in pre-trial detention. On 1 May 2023, Egyptian Al Jazeera journalist Hisham Abdel Aziz was released after being detained without trial for four years. He was accused of "spreading false information" and "membership of a terrorist group" when he was arrested in June 2019. Two other Egyptian Al Jazeera journalists, Bahaa Eldin Ibrahim and Rabie el-Sheikh, were still detained as of May 2023.

== Economic relations ==
From January 2003 to June 2014, Egypt accounted for the largest share of all financial investments made by Qatari firms at 31.1 percent.

During the one-year reign of Mohamed Morsi, Qatar assisted Egypt by sending it $7.5 bn in grants and loans. Following Morsi's ouster from power in July 2013, Egypt in September 2013 returned $2 bn that Qatar deposited in its central bank. Between September and November 2014, Egypt paid back $2.5 bn in debts. The last $1 bn of Egypt's debts to Qatar were paid out in July 2016.

In April 2025, Qatar and Egypt agreed to work towards a package of $7.5 billion in direct Qatari investments. The initial statement from the Egyptian President's Office, which followed a visit on Sunday by Egyptian President Abdel Fattah al-Sisi to Qatar to meet Emir Sheikh Tamim bin Hamad al-Thani, did not provide any greater level of detail on the intended investment.

== Resident diplomatic missions ==
- Egypt has an embassy in Doha.
- Qatar has an embassy in Cairo.

== See also ==
- Foreign relations of Egypt
- Foreign relations of Qatar
