= Ian Lee (journalist) =

American journalist

- Born: Ian James Lee; 1984 (age 41–42); Lander, Wyoming, United States
- Education: Arizona State University
- Occupation: Journalist
- Years active: 2008–present

Ian James Lee (born 1984) is an American journalist based in Britain for CBS News. Prior to working for CBS, he worked for CNN, and, before that, Lee was also the multimedia editor at the Daily News Egypt from 2009 to 2011. During that time, he also was a freelance video journalist for Time Magazine and spent a year as a package producer for Reuters. Lee has covered the 2011 Arab Spring, Euromaidan, Sochi Winter Olympics, 2013 Egyptian coup d'état in Egypt, 2014 Gaza War, 2016 Turkish coup d'état attempt, and 2017 North Korea crisis, among other things.

== Early life ==
Lee was born in Lander, Wyoming, USA. Lee graduated in 2007 from the Walter Cronkite School of Journalism and Mass Communication at Arizona State University with a bachelor's degree in journalism, along with certificates in Islamic Studies and Arabic. He was accepted into an internship program funded by the Carnegie-Knight Carnegie-Knight Initiative on the Future of Journalism Education a. In 2008, Lee received a Fulbright scholarship, among 12 Arizona State University graduates selected for a Fulbright that. He spent a year at American University in Cairo, Egypt, studying the reporting differences between newspapers written in English and those written in Arabic.

== Career ==
Lee began working for CNN after a church bombing in Alexandria, Egypt, on New Year’s Eve 2010. One of Lee’s Tweets during the January 25 Revolution is cited in the book A Twitter Year: 365 Days in 140 Characters by Kate Bussmann. Lee's Tweets are also preserved in an archived collection maintained by the American University in Cairo's Rare Books and Special Collections Library as part of the blogs, Twitter feeds, local and regional media coverage, and other sites related to the January 25th Revolution. Lee is also quoted in News Now: Visual Storytelling in the Digital Age by Susan Green, Mark Lodato, B. William Silcock, and Carol Schwalbe.

While covering the Libyan Revolution of 2011, Lee was injured in Sirte by a rocket-propelled grenade (RPG) that exploded next to him. It killed an ambulance driver and sent shrapnel into his leg.

During the 2013-15 detention of Al-Jazeera journalists by Egypt, CNN’s Lee reported several times on the Al Jazeera English news channel in a show of solidarity with the imprisoned journalists. Lee's coverage of the Al Jazeera trial is documented in the book, The Marriott Cell: An Epic Journey from Cairo's Scorpion Prison to Freedom by Mohamed Fahmy.

Lee was on board the Royal Caribbean Oasis of the Seas in the Atlantic Ocean to cover the solar eclipse of August 21, 2017. He was on Anderson Cooper 360° while experiencing totality on the cruise liner.

== Awards ==
- 2008 – Fulbright Scholarship.
- 2011 – Emmy Award for Revolution in Egypt: President Mubarak Steps Down.
- 2011 – Investigative Reporters and Editors’ Tom Renner Award for Death in the Desert.
- 2011 – Peabody Award.
