= Al Jazeera controversies =

Al Jazeera Media Network is a media company headquartered in Doha, Qatar. Its flagship news channels are Al Jazeera Arabic and Al Jazeera English. According to Al Jazeera, its Arabic and English channels are editorially independent from one another. Al Jazeera has been involved in a number of controversies. Some of its reporting has drawn criticism or objections from governments. In addition, Al Jazeera journalists have faced unlawful detention in certain countries, and the network or its reporters have been restricted or banned from operating in some countries.

== By country ==
=== Algeria ===
Several Algerian cities lost power on 27 January 1999, reportedly to keep residents from watching a program in which Algerian dissidents implicated the Algerian military in a series of massacres. The Communications Ministry of Algeria asked foreign media networks not to cover the release of banned Islamic Salvation Front (FIS) second-in-command Ali Benhadj, who had participated in crimes against humanity, which Al Jazeera journalists covered anyway and were subsequently requested to leave the country or face imprisonment.

On 4 July 2004, the Algerian government temporarily suspended Al Jazeera's Algerian correspondent, with the given explanation being that the work of foreign correspondents was being reorganized. According to Reporters Without Borders, however, the suspension was for broadcasting an episode of Al-Etjah Al-Mo'akis the week before that included a debate on the political situation in Algeria.

In May 2023, senior Al Jazeera newscaster Abdel Samad Nasser was dismissed for comments he made about a broadcast on Algerian state television featuring a Saudi hashtag calling for Moroccan women to be expelled from Saudi Arabia.

=== Australia ===
In 2019, Al Jazeera Investigates shot a documentary film, which was aired in Australia by the Australian Broadcasting Corporation (ABC), titled How to Sell a Massacre. The documentary investigated Pauline Hanson's One Nation, a right-wing populist, national conservative political party in Australia, and the National Rifle Association of America (NRA), a US gun lobby that is opposed to gun control, such as the strict gun laws of Australia, which were put in place after the 1996 Port Arthur massacre. One Nation tried to secure millions from the NRA, prompting Al Jazeera to investigate by hiring Australian reporter Rodger Muller to pose as the founder and president of a fake Australian gun lobby appealing to the NRA and One Nation. Muller contacted One Nation and informed the party of its connections to the NRA, which convinced One Nation staffer Steve Ashby to meet Muller in the United States. Muller organised a meeting with Ashby and Steve Dickson (who was, at the time, a One Nation staffer and the leader of the party's Queensland branch) in Washington D.C., where he met with them whilst secretly recording them with a hidden camera.

Pauline Hanson—One Nation leader and Queensland senator—heavily criticised the documentary and lashed out at Muller, Al Jazeera, the Qatari government, the ABC, and then-Prime Minister Scott Morrison. She claimed that Al Jazeera was "Islamist" and a "foreign agent", and referred the matter to the Australian Federal Police (AFP) and the Australian Security Intelligence Organisation (ASIO).

=== Bangladesh ===
In 2012, Al Jazeera faced criticism from Bangladeshi human rights activists and relatives of those killed in the 1971 Bangladesh Liberation War.

In response to the Al Jazeera Investigates documentary All the Prime Minister's Men, the government of Bangladesh described it as "a misleading series of innuendos and insinuations in what is apparently a politically motivated 'smear campaign' by notorious individuals associated with the Jamaat-i-Islami extremist group, which has been opposing the progressive and secular principles of the People's Republic of Bangladesh since its very birth as an independent nation in 1971". The foreign ministry stated that the Bangladeshi government "regrets that Al Jazeera has allowed itself to become an instrument for their malicious political designs aimed at destabilizing the secular democratic Government of Bangladesh with a proven track record of extraordinary socio-economic development and progress". The ministry also stated that "the fact that the report's historical account fails to even mention the horrific genocide in 1971 in which Jamaat perpetrators killed millions of Bengali civilians" was "one reflection of the political bias in Al Jazeera's coverage". The Bangladesh Army called the documentary a "concocted and ill-intended report by a vested group in the news channel Al-Jazeera", according to a statement by ISPR.

Responding to allegations by Al Jazeera that Israeli surveillance equipment is used by the Bangladesh UN Peacekeeping Force, United Nations (UN) spokesman Stéphane Dujarric said that UN agreements with Bangladesh on peacekeeping deployments did not include the "operation of electronic equipment in the nature described by Al Jazeera in its documentary, and such equipment has not been deployed with Bangladeshi contingents in UN peacekeeping operations". The UN called for an investigation into allegations of corruption among senior Bangladeshi officials.

The Bangladesh Federal Union of Journalists demanded a ban on Al Jazeera transmission within Bangladesh citing similar bans in Saudi Arabia, Bahrain, Egypt, Jordan and the UAE.

=== Bahrain ===
Bahrain Information Minister Nabeel bin Yaqub Al-Hamar banned Al Jazeera correspondents from reporting from inside the country on 10 May 2002, saying that the station was biased towards Israel and against Bahrain. After improvements in Bahrain–Qatar relations in 2004, Al Jazeera correspondents returned to Bahrain. In 2010, however, the Information Ministry again banned Al Jazeera correspondents from reporting inside the country. The ministry accused the network of "flouting [Bahrain's] laws regulating the press and publishing" after Al Jazeera aired a report on poverty in Bahrain.

During his visit to Egypt in November 2011, Bahrain Centre for Human Rights president Nabeel Rajab criticized Al Jazeera's coverage of the 2011 protests and said that it represents an Arabic double standard. Rajab said, "Al Jazeera's intentional ignoring ... coverage of Bahrain protests makes me strongly believe that we need channels that are sponsored by people rather than by regimes." In the run-up to the Qatar diplomatic crisis, Bahrain blocked Al Jazeera within its borders.

=== Democratic Republic of the Congo ===
The Democratic Republic of the Congo banned Al Jazeera on 9 January 2025 after it aired an interview with Bertrand Bisimwa, the rebel leader of the March 23 Movement (M23). The Congolese justice minister Constant Mutamba had previously—on X—threatened journalists and others who reported on the M23 rebels with the death penalty.

=== Egypt ===
Al Jazeera has faced considerable criticism and backlash in Egypt and other Arab countries; from ordinary people, media outlets, and governments who accuse it of supporting Qatari agenda and Islamists such as the Muslim Brotherhood. On June 23, 2011, three Al Jazeera journalists were sentenced by an Egyptian court to up to 10 years in jail for aiding a "terrorist organization", referring to the Muslim Brotherhood. Al Jazeera has been criticized by an Egyptian newspaper for its allegedly biased coverage of news related to Egypt and its government. According to the Egypt Independent, many Egyptians believe Al Jazeera's attacks to be a concerted effort by the channel to destroy Egypt's image in the region."

In 2010, Al Jazeera filed a lawsuit against the Egyptian Al-Ahram newspaper for "Jazeerat al-Taharoush" ("Al Jazeera: An Island of Harassment"), a 9 June 2010 article that Al Jazeera found "wholly deceptive and journalistically unprofessional" with an aim to "damage the reputation of the Al Jazeera Network."

A Cairo court ordered Al Jazeera to stop broadcasting in Egypt in September 2013, saying that it was "inciting violence that led to the deaths of Egyptians." On 29 December of that year, three journalists working for Al Jazeera English (Australian Peter Greste, Egyptian-Canadian Mohamed Fahmy and Egyptian Baher Mohammed) were taken into custody by Egyptian security forces at the Cairo Marriott Hotel. On 23 June 2014, after a four-month trial, they were found guilty of spreading false news and collaborating with the Muslim Brotherhood and sentenced to seven to 10 years' imprisonment. They were released on bail shortly afterwards, and Mohamed Fahmy sued Al Jazeera on 5 May 2015 for C$100 million (US$83 million; £53m) in punitive and remedial damages for negligence and breach of contract. He accused the network of "negligence" by misinforming him about its legal status and their safety in Egypt. The three were pardoned on 23 September 2015 and released. Egypt blocked 21 websites, including Al-Jazeera and Masr AlArabiya, in May 2017, for allegedly supporting terrorism and spreading fake news by supporting the outlawed Muslim Brotherhood.

In 2021, Egyptian media criticized Al Jazeera for refusing to cover the protests against a controversial electoral law in Qatar, which limited the voting rights of a Bedouin tribe. According to Ikram Badr al-Din, a professor of political science at Cairo University, this "suggests that it is not independent and works only for the benefit of the ruling family in Qatar."

=== India ===
Columnist Seema Sirohi has accused Al Jazeera of spreading an ignorant anti-India narrative in its coverage of the country. The Indian government banned the Al Jazeera TV channel in April 2015 for five days for repeatedly broadcasting disputed maps of India. The Surveyor General of India (SGI) had observed that, in some of the maps displayed by Al Jazeera, "a portion of the Indian territory of Jammu and Kashmir (i.e., PoK and Aksai Chin) has not been shown as a part of Indian territory"; Lakshadweep and the Andaman Islands were also not shown as Indian territories on some of the maps. In its reply to an order to show cause, Al Jazeera said that all its maps are generated by internationally known software used by global news providers. In a separate statement, Al Jazeera said that it was penalised for a legacy issue since it had abided by the Indian guidelines since 2014.

In June 2023, India ... Who Lit the Fuse?, a documentary produced by Al Jazeera's Point Blank investigation series, was banned by the Allahabad High Court in Uttar Pradesh. The documentary investigates the activities of Hindu nationalist groups and portrays the challenges faced by India's Muslim minority.

=== Iraq ===
During the Iraq War, Al Jazeera and other news-gathering organizations experienced reporting and movement restrictions. Reporter Tayseer Allouni was expelled from the country, and Diyar Al-Omari, another reporter, was stripped of his journalistic credentials by the US. On 2 April 2003, the organization announced that it would "temporarily freeze all coverage" of Iraq in protest of what Al Jazeera called unreasonable interference by Iraqi officials. Contrary to allegations, including those by Donald Rumsfeld on 4 June 2005, Al Jazeera has never shown beheadings; beheadings have appeared on a number of other websites, and have sometimes been misattributed to the organization. When the allegations were reported in other media, Al Jazeera pressed for retractions; The Guardian later corrected its report that the organization "had shown videos of masked terrorists beheading western hostages". The allegation was repeated on Fox News, however, when Al Jazeera's English service was launched on 15 November 2006.

The Iraqi Allawi government closed Al Jazeera's Iraq office on 7 August 2004, calling the network responsible for a negative image of Iraq and charging it with fueling anti-Coalition hostilities. Al Jazeera spokesman Jihad Ballout said, "It's regrettable and we believe it's not justifiable. This latest decision runs contrary to all the promises made by Iraqi authorities concerning freedom of expression and freedom of the press," and Al Jazeera vowed to continue reporting from inside Iraq. Photographs showed United States and Iraqi military personnel closing the office. The initial one-month shutdown was extended indefinitely in September 2004, and the offices were sealed, drawing condemnation from international journalists.

In September 2008, Al Jazeera broadcast live the killing of a U.S. soldier by an Iraqi sniper in Baghdad.

In April 2013, Iraq banned Al Jazeera and nine other TV channels for "sectarian bias". In a statement, the Iraqi Communication and Media Commission said that the satellite channels had "exaggerated things, given misinformation and called for breaking the law and attacking Iraqi security forces". The commission noted a "sectarian tone" in the TV coverage and "undisciplined media messages exceeded all reasonable limits", threatening to "jeopardize the democratic process".

=== Israel ===
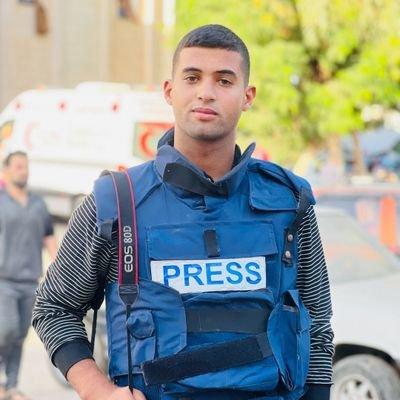
Al Jazeera's Gaza correspondent Hossam Shabat was assassinated by Israel on 24 March 2025. Israel claimed he was a member of Hamas.

Al Jazeera TV covered welcome-home celebrations for Samir Kuntar, a Lebanese Hezbollah member who was imprisoned in Israel for killing several people during a Palestinian Liberation Front-led raid from Lebanon into Israel. Kuntar was released from prison on July 19, 2008. On the program, Al Jazeera Beirut office head Ghassan bin Jiddo called Kuntar a "pan-Arab hero" and organized a birthday party for him. Israel's Government Press Office (GPO) announced a boycott of the channel, including a refusal by Israeli officials to be interviewed and a ban of its correspondents entering government offices in Jerusalem. Several days later, Al Jazeera director-general Wadah Khanfar issued a letter stating that the program violated the channel's code of ethics and saying that he ordered its programming director to take steps to ensure that such an incident would not recur.

In a 2002 article, Neil Hickey commented on the divergent framing of issues relating to the Israeli–Palestinian conflict between Al-Jazeera and the American press. Hickey stated that in the 2002 Hadera attack, the network omitted that the victims were attending a bat mitzvah at a crowded banquet hall, whereas US networks focused on home videos of the event.

Israeli leadership again accused Al Jazeera of bias in 2008. Deputy Foreign Minister Majalli Wahabi accused the organization of focusing on Palestinian suffering and downplaying that of Israel, referring to Israeli residents of the western Negev who had been the target of rocket attacks from the Gaza Strip. "We have seen that Al-Jazeera has become part of Hamas ... taking sides and cooperating with people who are enemies of the state of Israel," said Wahabi. "The moment a station like Al-Jazeera gives unreliable reports, represents only one side, and doesn't present the positions of the other side, why should we cooperate?" According to Israeli officials, Al Jazeera covered the Gaza incursion but not Palestinian rocket attacks on the Israeli city of Ashkelon. Wahabi said that the Israeli Foreign Ministry would send letters of complaint to the government of Qatar and Al Jazeera.

In February 2015, Al Jazeera posted an article on its online edition alleging that the Israeli government had opened dams in its southern region to flood parts of the Gaza Strip intentionally. The article was replaced on 25 February with a statement that there were no dams in southern Israel, and the original article was false. During the June 2017 Jerusalem attack, Israeli media accused Al-Jazeera of not identifying it as a terrorist attack and ignoring an attack by three Palestinians on the Temple Mount in Old Jerusalem (focusing instead on the killing of a Palestinian by Israeli forces during Friday prayers).

Al Jazeera veteran Shireen Abu Akleh, covering an Israeli raid in Jenin on 11 May 2022, was fatally shot in the head. Israeli leadership later said its soldier probably fired the round by mistake, while Al Jazeera insists she was deliberately targeted.

On 1 April 2024, Israel's parliament approved a law that would allow Israel to shut down Al Jazeera broadcasts from inside the country and the occupied territories. Prime Minister of Israel Benjamin Netanyahu accused Al-Jazeera of "actively participating in the October 7 massacre and inciting against IDF soldiers". Israeli authorities also cited Al Jazeera's alleged links to Hamas.

On 5 May 2024, the Israeli government shut down Al Jazeera in Israel and authorized the seizure of its equipment. An Israeli court deemed following the presentation of evidence in June 2024 that "Al Jazeera is perceived by the terrorist organization Hamas as its propaganda and intelligence arm" and raised concern on the influence of Al Jazeera content in encoring violent acts within Israel. Following Israel's closure of an Al Jazeera office in the West Bank, Mustafa Barghouti criticized the move as illegal, stating, "This is the real face of Israel, a country that claims to be a democracy and claims to be supporting freedom of press... Israel has no right, legally speaking, to close any office in Area A or B." On 22 September 2024, IDF soldiers raided the Al Jazeera bureau in the occupied West Bank and delivered a 45-day closure order.

In October 2024, the IDF reported finding documents showing six Al Jazeera journalists were operatives for Hamas and Palestinian Islamic Jihad, with Al Jazeera rejecting these claims. In October 2025, the IDF and the Intelligence and Terrorism Information Center reported having found documents in Gaza connecting Hamas directly to Al Jazeera.

=== Kuwait ===
The Al Jazeera office in Kuwait City was closed by government officials after the organization aired a story on police crackdowns. The story included interviews with members of the Kuwaiti opposition and a video of police beating activists. Four National Assembly members were injured in the crackdown. Kuwait's Minister of Information described Al Jazeera's coverage as "interference in Kuwait's internal affairs."

=== Libya ===
According to Libyan media, Al Jazeera worked on behalf of the Western world and the Gulf Cooperation Council to promote anti-Libyan policies and "disseminate falsehoods and lies to incite international public opinion". Emir of Qatar Hamad bin Khalifa Al Thani opposed the government of Libya and supported the 2011 Libyan Civil War. The emir ordered Al Jazeera to emphasize the Libyan conflict, contributing to the insurgency's spread and influencing the Arab world's view of Libya. Within a week of the start of the rebellion, Al Jazeera began using the rebels' tricolor flag to identify its coverage.

Pepe Escobar wrote that Emir Hamad bin Khalifa "showed up on al-Jazeera and said that action was needed because the Libyan people were attacked by Gaddafi. The otherwise excellent al-Jazeera journalists could have politely asked the emir whether he would send his Mirages to protect the people of Palestine from Israel, or his neighbors in Bahrain from Saudi Arabia." The organization reported that Muammar Gaddafi was ordering troops to use rape as a weapon of war and issuing Viagra to his troops. Amnesty International investigated the claims and found them groundless.

=== Malaysia ===
Al Jazeera aired Locked Up in Malaysia's Lockdown, a 101 East documentary alleging that the government of Malaysia mistreated illegal migrants and foreign workers during the country's COVID-19 lockdown, on 3 July 2020. The documentary was called "misleading" and "inaccurate" by the Malaysian government; Senior Minister Ismail Sabri Yaakob demanded an apology from the organization for "false reporting". The Royal Malaysia Police began an investigation of the documentary, and the Immigration Department sought to question the Al Jazeera journalists and a Bangladeshi migrant whom they interviewed. Several non-governmental organizations, including the Centre for Investigative Journalism (CIJ), issued a statement defending Al Jazeera and calling on the Malaysian government to end its "intimidatory measures" against Al Jazeera and migrant workers.

On 4 August, a team of Malaysian police officers and personnel from the Malaysian Communications and Multimedia Commission raided Al Jazeera's office near the Petronas Towers and seized several devices as part of their investigation of the documentary. Al Jazeera English managing director Giles Trendle condemned the raid as a "crackdown on media freedom", and called on Malaysian authorities to end the criminal investigation of its journalists.

=== Saudi Arabia ===
In 2001, Saudi Crown Prince Abdullah bin Abdul Aziz attacked Al Jazeera at the Gulf Coordinating Council summit meeting held in Muscat that December. According to the Lebanese newspaper Al Anwar, the crown prince was angry over the network's coverage of the arrest of a Saudi princess in the United States for alleged "enslavement" of an Indonesian maid. He complained Al Jazeera had relied solely on the U.S. media's version of events. In 2017, Saudi Arabia banned Al Jazeera and another Qatari website after Emir of Qatar Tamim bin Hamad Al Thani said that he recognized Iran as an Islamic regional power and criticized Saudi Arabia and Donald Trump's policy toward Iran. He praised the Lebanese organization Hezbollah and the Palestinian group Hamas. Qatar denied the allegations, saying that its QNA website had been hacked and it was investigating the incident.

=== Somalia ===
Al Jazeera aired The Toxic Truth, a two-part documentary on toxic waste dumped in Somalia, in January 2009. A Somali journalist who studied the documentary concluded that the organization failed to rigorously research the story.

=== Spain ===
Reporter Tayseer Allouni was arrested in Spain on 5 September 2003 and charged with providing support to members of al-Qaeda. Judge Baltasar Garzón, who issued the arrest warrant, ordered Allouni held without bail. Al Jazeera wrote to Spanish prime minister Jose Maria Aznar in protest: "On several occasions, Western journalists met secretly with secret organizations and they were not subjected to any legal action because they were doing their job, so why is Allouni being excluded?" Allouni was later released on bail for health reasons, but was prohibited from leaving the country.

On 19 September, a Spanish court issued an arrest warrant for Allouni before the expected verdict. Allouni had asked the court for permission to attend his mother's funeral in Syria, but authorities denied his request and ordered him back to jail.

After pleading not guilty, Allouni was sentenced on 26 September 2005 to seven years in prison for being a financial courier for al-Qaeda. Allouni insisted that he merely interviewed Osama bin Laden after the 11 September 2001 attack on the United States. Al Jazeera has supported Allouni, insisting that he is innocent.

Reporters Without Borders condemned Allouni's rearrest, and called on the Spanish court to free him. In January 2012, The European Court of Human Rights ruled on 17 January 2012 that the Spanish sentence was illegal, and Allouni was freed in March.

=== Sudan ===
In May 2019, Sudan closed Al Jazeera's office. Sudan summoned its envoy in Qatar for consultation the following month, saying the envoy would soon return. Qatar was seen as a close ally of ousted Sudanese president Omar al-Bashir.

=== Sweden ===
Al Jazeera has been criticized for repeatedly spreading disinformation about Sweden, such as accusing the Swedish National Board of Health and Welfare of kidnapping Muslim children and having them raised by homosexual parents. In 2024, Al Jazeera released a documentary in which Sweden was accused of kidnapping children. Prime Minister Ulf Kristersson criticized the documentary as "dangerous for Sweden" and stated that it can increase threats towards Sweden. A Swedish gay couple became the targets of a hate campaign after Al Jazeera and other Arabic news sources published a fabricated story claiming that their adopted daughter had been kidnapped from her Muslim parents by the social services and given to the gay couple. The girl's biological mother was, in fact, a Christian and had consented to the adoption.

=== Syria ===
Al Jazeera has been criticized for its coverage of the Syrian civil war, largely supporting the rebels and demonizing the Syrian government. The Lebanese newspaper As-Safir cited outtakes of interviews in which the channel's staff coached Syrian eyewitnesses and fabricated reports of government oppression and leaked internal emails suggesting that the organization has become a tool of the Qatari emir's foreign policy supporting Syria's rebels and advocating military intervention in the country.

Ahmad Ibrahim, in charge of Al Jazeera's coverage of Syria, is the brother of a leading member of the rebel Syrian National Council. Al Jazeera reportedly pressured its journalists to use the term "martyr" for slain Syrian rebels, but not pro-government forces.

=== Ukraine ===
During the Russian invasion of Ukraine, Al Jazeera English described the Ukrainian refugees by stating, "These are not, obviously, refugees trying to get away from areas in the Middle East that are still in a big state of war", and added, "They look like any European family that you would live next door to." The network subsequently issued an apology for these comments, labeling them as "insensitive and" irresponsible".

=== United Arab Emirates ===
In 2015, Al Jazeera was condemned by UAE Minister of Foreign Affairs Anwar Gargash for twisting a statement by UAE Foreign Minister Abdullah bin Zayed Al Nahyan about the Russian Sukhoi Su-24 downed by Turkey. During a press conference with a Russian official in Abu Dhabi, Al Nahyan said that the UAE "offers its deepest condolences to our Russian friends on the incident of the military plane that crashed recently in Syria" and called the crash of a Russian civilian plane in Egypt "a terrorist act". Al Jazeera reported that he "describes the Turkish shooting of the Russian fight jet a [sic?] terrorist act," which Gargash said ignored the fact that he was referring to the Russian passenger plane which crashed in Egypt. The Al Jazeera statement was reported more than once, and was tweeted by the channel on its main Twitter account. According to Gargash, "The way Al Jazeera channel has dealt with the statement of Shaikh Abdullah Bin Zayed was not a professional blunder; It was part of a smear campaign [by the media] against the UAE."

The UAE blocked Al Jazeera in the emirates on 5 June 2017 (after the onset of the Qatar diplomatic crisis) because of its perceived sympathies to the Qatari government. In the International Court of Justice case filed by Qatar against the United Arab Emirates about the elimination of all forms of racial discrimination (Qatar v. United Arab Emirates), Qatar requested that the court order the UAE to suspend its block of Al Jazeera. The court ruled, "both parties shall refrain from any action which might aggravate or extend the dispute before the court or make it more difficult to resolve".

In June 2017, hacked emails from UAE ambassador to the US Yousef Al Otaiba were reported as "embarrassing" by HuffPost because they indicated links between the UAE and the US-based Foundation for Defense of Democracies. According to a number of observers, the extensive media coverage of the alleged email hack was seen as exacerbating the Qatar diplomatic crisis and orchestrated by Qatar.

After the 2017 Qatar diplomatic crisis and in 2018, Al Jazeera reported apparent new details about a 1996 Qatari coup d'état attempt which accused the UAE, Saudi Arabia, Bahrain, and Egypt of plotting to overthrow Hamad bin Khalifa Al Thani. According to the organization, former French National Gendarmerie commander Paul Barril was contracted and supplied with weapons by the UAE to carry out the coup in Qatar. UAE Minister of Foreign Affairs Anwar Gargash said that Barril was a security guard for Qatari emir Khalifa bin Hamad Al Thani during the emir's visit to Abu Dhabi; had no connection to the UAE, and the report was an attempt to involve the UAE in the coup attempt.

=== United Kingdom ===
UK officials, like their US counterparts, protested against Al Jazeera's coverage of the 2003 invasion of Iraq. According to the organization, coalition leaders objected because its reporting made it more difficult for both countries to manage the reporting of the war.

=== United States ===
==== U.S. criticism and effort to shut down Al Jazeera ====
Since the September 11 attacks, US officials have accused Al Jazeera's news coverage of anti-American bias. The organization first received widespread attention in the West after 9/11, when it broadcast videos in which Osama bin Laden and Sulaiman Abu Ghaith defended the attacks. This led to accusations by the United States government that Al Jazeera was broadcasting propaganda on behalf of terrorists. The organization countered that it was making information available without comment, and several Western television channels later broadcast portions of the tapes. At a 3 October 2001 press conference, Colin Powell tried to persuade the emir of Qatar to close Al Jazeera.

When Al Jazeera reported events with graphic footage from inside Iraq, the organization was described as anti-American and inciting violence because it reported on issues of national security. In 2003, Al Jazeera's Washington bureau chief Hafez al-Mirazi resigned to protest the organization's "Islamist drift."

==== U.S. military attacks ====
On 13 November 2001, during the war in Afghanistan, a US missile destroyed Al Jazeera's office in Kabul. There were no casualties.

In the course of the U.S.-led invasion of Iraq, a U.S. missile struck the Baghdad bureau of Al Jazeera, killing one Al Jazeera staff member, wounding another, and setting fire to the office. The missile strike occurred in the same time frame in which another U.S. missile at a different part of Baghdad struck Abu Dhabi TV, another Gulf State-based Arabic news channel, and amidst a wave of U.S. military hits on a hotel in which many journalists were sheltering. The U.S. government had been critical of Al Jazeera's no-holds-barred coverage of the U.S.-led invasion, but denied that its attack on the Al Jazeera bureau was deliberate. The attack caused Al Jazeera to leave Iraq for fear of its journalists' safety.

==== Bans in New York ====
On 24 March 2003, two Al Jazeera reporters covering the New York Stock Exchange (NYSE) had their credentials revoked. The NYSE banned Al Jazeera and several other undisclosed news organizations from its trading floor indefinitely. According to NYSE spokesman Ray Pellechia, the ban was for "security reasons," and the exchange had decided to allow access only to networks focusing "on responsible business coverage". Pellechia denied that the revocation of credentials was connected to Al Jazeera's Iraq War coverage. However, NYSE executive vice president for communications Robert Zito indicated that Al Jazeera's 22 March 2003 broadcast of US POWs and dead American soldiers led him to ban the organization. The move was quickly mirrored by NASDAQ stock-market officials. The NYSE ban was lifted several months later. Akamai Technologies, a US company whose founder was killed in the 11 September World Trade Center attacks, canceled a contract to provide web services for Al Jazeera's English-language website.

==== Broadcast of remarks by Sarah Palin rally participants ====
On 12 October 2008, Al Jazeera broadcast interviews with attendees of a Sarah Palin rally in St. Clairsville, Ohio. The interviewees made racist remarks about Barack Obama, such as "he regards white people as trash" and "I'm afraid if he wins, the blacks will take over". The report received over 2 million views on YouTube and, according to Colin Powell, "Those kind of images going out on Al Jazeera are killing us." The Washington Post then ran an op-ed saying that Al Jazeera was deliberately encouraging "anti-American sentiment overseas". The organization called the column "a gratuitous and uninformed shot at Al Jazeera's motives", and its report was only one of "hundreds of hours of diverse coverage".

==== U.S. pressure ====
Al Jazeera has reportedly censored criticism of the United States in response to US pressure. Al Jazeera English director Wadah Khanfar resigned in September 2011 after WikiLeaks documents asserted that he had close ties to the US and agreed to remove content if Washington objected.

In 2014, Al Jazeera retracted an article which claimed that the murders of two US journalists (James Foley and Steven Sotloff) by Islamic State were staged by the US as an excuse for attacking ISIS.

== Other ==
Ana Belén Soage-Antepazo has criticized Al Jazeera for what she describes as its "bias," noting a "certain disregard toward religious minorities." She argues that the network primarily seeks to appeal to Muslims, particularly Sunni Muslims.

=== Israeli–Palestinian conflict ===
During the Second Intifada, Palestinians killed by Israelis were referred to as "martyrs"; Israelis killed by Palestinians were not.

Israel announced a "boycott" of the Arabic broadcaster on 13 March 2008, accusing it of bias in its coverage of the Gaza Strip conflict and toward Hamas. Israeli government employees declined interviews and denied visa applications for the organization's staff. Israeli Deputy Foreign Minister Majalli Wahabi accused it of focusing on Palestinian suffering and ignoring that of Israel: "We have seen that Al-Jazeera has become part of Hamas ... [sic] taking sides and cooperating with people who are enemies of the state of Israel." According to Israeli officials, Al-Jazeera covered the Gaza incursion but not Palestinian rocket attacks against the Israeli city of Ashkelon. Wahabi said that the Israeli Foreign Ministry would send letters of complaint to the organization and the Qatari government. Officials of Palestinian President Mahmoud Abbas' Fatah party has accused Al-Jazeera of bias toward Hamas (with which it is at political loggerheads), and Fatah official Mohammed Dahlan sued the broadcaster. Al-Jazeera agreed to discuss its coverage of Mideast conflict, and the issue has apparently been settled.

In February 2009, Israel again imposed sanctions on Al Jazeera after Qatar closed the Israeli trade office in Doha in protest against the Gaza War. Israel had considered declaring Al Jazeera a hostile entity and shutting its Israeli offices, but after a legal review the Israeli government decided to impose limited measures restricting the organization's activities in the country. All Al Jazeera employees would not have their visas renewed, and the Israeli government would issue no new visas. Al Jazeera staff would not be allowed to attend government briefings; its access to government and military offices was reduced, and it could not interview Knesset members. The organization would only have access to three agencies: representatives of the Prime Minister's Office, the Foreign Ministry, and the IDF Spokesperson's Unit.

On 15 July of that year, the Palestinian National Authority (PA) closed down Al Jazeera's offices in the West Bank in an apparent response to claims made on the channel by Farouk Kaddoumi that PA president Mahmoud Abbas had been involved in the death of Yasser Arafat. The Palestinian Information Ministry called the organization's coverage "unbalanced" and accused it of incitement against the PLO and the PA. Four days later, Abbas rescinded the ban and allowed Al Jazeera to resume operations.

In August 2011, Afghan bureau chief Samer Allawi was arrested by Israeli authorities and charged with being a member of Hamas. Walied Al-Omary, Al Jazeera bureau chief in Israel and the Palestinian territories, said that a military court accused Allawi of making contact with members of Hamas' armed wing. The Committee to Protect Journalists Middle East and North Africa program coordinator Mohamed Abdel Dayem stated that "Israel must clarify why it continues to hold Samer Allawi." Allawi was imprisoned for over a month and fined $1,400 after pleading guilty to meeting with Hamas, a militant group viewed as terrorist by Israel and most of the West. Allawi maintained that meeting Hamas officials was part of his job as a journalist. While in Israeli custody, Israeli sources said Allawi admitted to links with Hamas. Allawi's lawyer said the confession was "forced". After release, Allawi said ""The whole arrest episode was a charade aimed at extorting al-Jazeera. I was not the target."

During the Gaza war, Al Jazeera was conducting an interview with a wounded Gazan resident, who blamed Hamas hiding amongst civilians for his wounds; Al Jazeera promptly ended the interview.

Al Jazeera has also been accused of pushing Hamas propaganda, repeatedly broadcasting statements by Hamas' military and political leaders calling for a broader uprising and aligning themselves closely with Hamas' preferred language for the conflict. In addition, Israel accused several journalists of Al Jazeera of assisting or commanding Hamas units in their fight against Israel.

Al Jazeera cameraman Samer Abu Daqqa was killed by an Israeli airstrike on 15 December 2023 targeting Al Jazeera bureau chief Wael Al-Dahdouh, who was also injured during the strike.

In December 2023, a woman said that all aid to Gaza was taken to Hamas tunnels, prompting the Al Jazeera journalist to say "people say that only a little aid gets in and is distributed," to which the woman said on the aid that "It all goes to their houses. Let Hamas take me or shoot me.", according to Jpost this prompted the journalist to end the interview.

The IDF accused one of Al Jazeera's journalists in Gaza of being a deputy commander for Hamas and released images of him handling various weaponry.

In late March 2024, Al Jazeera published a story alleging that IDF soldiers had committed rape at al-Shifa Hospital in Gaza. After an investigation by Hamas, it was found that the story was fabricated by a Gazan woman who wanted to "arouse the nation's favor". Subsequently, Al Jazeera removed all relevant material and its former managing director Yasser Hilalah admitted the story was "fabricated".

In June 2024, after the rescue of 4 Israeli hostages in Gaza, it was revealed that some hostages had been held captive by a man who worked for the Palestine Chronicle and had also written an op-ed for Al Jazeera. Al Jazeera denied this. Later, after the Nuseirat rescue and massacre, The Jerusalem Post reported that Arab social media went viral as an uncut version of a video circulated online. In the uncut video, the doctor in the video heavily criticized Hamas, Al Jazeera was criticized for censoring the criticism of Hamas. The Forward described its coverage of the Gaza war as "Hamas-sympathetic" in 2025.

On 21 October 2025, the IDF and Israeli Intelligence said that they had uncovered documents in Gaza that they alleged connected Hamas directly to Al Jazeera. In the recovered documents the IDF allege Hamas attempted to set up a direct line with the Al Jazeera offices in Doha. This news comes almost a year after the IDF recovered documents they allege proved six Al Jazeera journalists were Hamas fighters. Al Jazeera has rejected these claims.

=== The Lobby ===
Journalist Armin Rosen of the American Jewish magazine Tablet published an article on 20 January 2017 saying that pro-Palestinian filmmaker and undercover Al Jazeera reporter James Anthony Kleinfeld had infiltrated several pro-Israel advocacy organizations in Washington, D.C., including StandWithUs, the Israel Project, the Foundation for Defense of Democracies, the Israel on Campus Coalition, and the Zionist Organization of America's (ZOA) Fuel For Truth. According to the article, Kleinfeld had also infiltrated pro-Israel organizations and circles in the United Kingdom (the subject of an Al Jazeera documentary that month). As an undercover journalist, Kleinfield had reportedly obtained work at several pro-Israel organizations, interviewed dozens of Jewish pro-Israel activists, had access to donors, hosted Israeli embassy officials at his home, and filmed dozens of hours of video. Kleinfield left Washington suddenly in January 2017, around the time that Al Jazeera broadcast The Lobby: a four-part documentary series which used undercover journalism to infiltrate several pro-Israel advocacy groups in the United Kingdom.

On 11 October 2017, Al Jazeera admitted that it had installed an undercover journalist in several Washington-based pro-Israel organizations the previous year and was planning to air a documentary film based on the reporter's work. The announcement followed a ruling by the British media regulator Ofcom which rejected complaints about The Lobby; the documentary led to the resignation of an Israeli diplomat and sparked accusations of antisemitism from UK pro-Israel advocacy groups and representatives of the Jewish community. Clayton Swisher, Al Jazeera's director of investigative reporting, acknowledged that the network had stationed an undercover journalist in the UK and the US at the same time.

On 8 February 2018, it was reported that Qatari leaders had reassured the leaders of American Jewish organizations that Al Jazeera would not air its companion documentary series on the Israel lobby in the United States. According to Haaretz, the Qatari government had hired Republican Senator Ted Cruz's former aide Nicolas Muzin to open communications channels with Jewish American organizations. Al Jazeera had earlier sent letters to several American pro-Israel organizations informing them that their employees would appear in the documentary. The letters generated speculation that the Qatari government had reneged on its promise to prevent Al Jazeera from screening the documentary, which (like the British series) had used clandestine footage and recordings of pro-Israel activists.

Al Jazeera's decision not to screen the documentary was criticized by Swisher, who defended the investigation unit's use of undercover journalism, accused the organization of bowing to outside pressure, and took a sabbatical to express his displeasure. In March, a bipartisan group of US lawmakers which included Democratic Congressman Josh Gottheimer, Republican Congressman Lee Zeldin, and Ted Cruz wrote a letter urging United States Attorney General Jeff Sessions to investigate whether Al Jazeera should register as a foreign agent under the Foreign Agents Registration Act. They also urged the Justice Department to investigate reports that the organization had infiltrated nonprofit organizations and accused Al Jazeera of broadcasting "anti-American, anti-Semitic, and anti-Israel" content.

The Zionist Organization of America said on 10 April 2018 that Morton Klein, its president, lobbied the Qatari government not to screen the companion documentary series focusing on the American pro-Israel lobby. Portions of the series were leaked in late August and early September by several outlets, including the Electronic Intifada. The Electronic Intifada, French media outlet Orient XXI and Lebanon's Al Akhbar newspaper released the four episodes of The Lobby—USA in early November.

Several pro-Israel British activists and a former Israeli embassy employee filed complaints with UK media regulator Ofcom in 2017 that The Lobby, an Al Jazeera four-part documentary series, was antisemitic. The complaints also accused the organization of bias, unfair editing, and infringement of privacy, because The Lobby used hidden cameras and undercover journalism to investigate alleged efforts by Israeli diplomats and UK pro-Israel advocacy groups to influence British foreign policy to favor Israel. On 9 October 2017, Ofcom issued a 60-page ruling rejecting the complaints which was welcomed by an Al Jazeera source as vindicating the organization's journalism.

=== Palestinian Authority ===
In December 2024, Fatah, which controls the Palestinian Authority, condemned Al Jazeera's coverage of its clashes with militant groups in the Jenin refugee camp. Accusing the network of fostering division "in our Arab homeland in general and in Palestine in particular", Fatah urged Palestinians to refrain from cooperating with Al Jazeera. Al Jazeera was subsequently banned from broadcasting within the West Bank.

=== Antisemitism ===
An article by Sherry Ricchiardi in the American Journalism Review (AJR) noted that critics of Al Jazeera have "assailed what they see as anti-Semitic, anti-American bias in the channel's news content." Ricchiardi had earlier criticized an Al Jazeera report that Jewish employees of 9/11 targets were informed of the attacks beforehand, a report which was also criticized in an October 2001 New York Times editorial. She cited the former Al Jazeera weekly show Sharia and Life, hosted by Yusuf Qaradawi (an Egyptian cleric who "argues clearly and consistently that hatred of Israel and Jews is Islamically sanctioned"). The organization held a 2008 on-air birthday party for Samir Kuntar, a Lebanese terrorist convicted of killing four Israelis who was released in July of that year, later admitting that its coverage of Kuntar's release violated its code of ethics. The organization's Beirut bureau chief said, "Brother Samir, we wish to celebrate your birthday with you" and called him a "pan-Arab hero."

Former Fox News conservative commentator Bill O'Reilly has called Al Jazeera "anti-Semitic" and "anti-American." Dave Marash who resigned from his position saying his exit was due in part to an anti-American bias at the network that is little seen in the US. Marash said he felt that attitude more from British administrators than Arabs. He said there were other reasons for his exit and was proud of the network's coverage of issues south of the equator, but that he ultimately felt that it was not the right place for him. He appeared on The O'Reilly Factor to challenge conservative host Bill O'Reilly's lambasting of Al Jazeera and said: "They certainly aren't anti-Semitic, but they are anti-Netanyahu and anti-Lieberman and anti-Israeli, right." Marash had also described Al Jazeera as "the best news channel on Earth."

On 30 May 2017, Al Jazeera's English-language account retweeted an antisemitic meme. The network tweeted an apology after the incident, calling it a "mistake".

In May 2019, AJ+ produced a video denying and minimizing the Holocaust. Al Jazeera said it had "swiftly deleted" the video, stating that it had "violated the editorial standards of the network". The video stated that "[the] number [of Jews murdered in the Holocaust] had been exaggerated and 'adopted by the Zionist movement', and that Israel is the 'biggest winner' from the genocide."

In August 2024, AJ was accused of leading an eruption of antisemitism, accused Arab leaders of having 'Jews ruling among them'.

=== Alleged pro-Qatar bias ===
Al Jazeera was founded in 1996 as part of Qatari efforts to turn economic power into political influence in the Arab world and beyond, and continues to receive political and financial backing from the government of Qatar. As a result, Al Jazeera has been criticized for being Qatari state media. In 2010, U.S. State Department internal communications in the 2010 diplomatic cables leak said that the Qatari government manipulates Al Jazeera coverage to suit the country's political interests.

Al Jazeera reporters and anchors in London, Paris, Moscow, Beirut and Cairo have resigned. Ali Hashem, the organization's Shia Beirut correspondent, resigned after leaked emails publicized his discontent with Al Jazeera's "unprofessional" and biased coverage of the Syrian civil war at the expense of the 2011 Bahraini uprising. Since the Bahrain government was supported by the Gulf Cooperation Council (of which Qatar is a member), the protests were given less prominence than the Syrian conflict on the network. Longtime Berlin correspondent Aktham Suliman left in late 2012, saying that he felt he was no longer allowed to work as an independent journalist:

Before the beginning of the Arab Spring, we were a voice for change, a platform for critics and political activists throughout the region. Now, Al-Jazeera has become a propaganda broadcaster... Al-Jazeera takes a clear position in every country from which it reports—not based on journalistic priorities, but rather on the interests of the Foreign Ministry of Qatar. In order to maintain my integrity as a reporter, I had to quit.

He added, "The news channel Al Jazeera was committed to the truth. Now it is bent. It's about politics, not journalism. For the reporter that means: time to go ... The decline [in] 2004–2011 was insidious, subliminal, and very slow, but with a disastrous end."

According to Walid Phares, Al Jazeera became the "primary ideological and communication network" for the Muslim Brotherhood during the 2011 Arab Spring in Tunisia, Egypt, Libya, Yemen, and Syria. Phares noted that after democratic forces had begun the rebellions, Al Jazeera played a "tremendous role" in supporting Islamist elements of the revolution.

One of the organization's largest resignations was that of 22 members of Al Jazeera's Egyptian bureau. The group announced their resignation on 8 July 2013, citing biased coverage of Egyptian power redistribution favoring the Muslim Brotherhood.

During the visit of the Qatari delegation to the 2017 UN General Assembly, anonymous critics commissioned what ostensibly appeared to be a news website, authoring a variety of articles calling Al Jazeera a "state-run propaganda arm", criticizing the Gulf state's link to terror groups or to Iran, and promoting a dark view of the Qatari economy in response to the diplomatic crisis that year. The organization commissioned to launch this website was later identified as a conservative-leaning PR firm, Definers Public Affairs, which was also hired by Facebook to attack the social network's opponents, including Apple, Google, and the philanthropist George Soros.

=== Islamist position ===
Since Al Jazeera's founding in 1996, its Islamist skew grew stronger and damaged Qatar's political relations with its neighboring states of Saudi Arabia and Egypt. According to Hugh Miles writing for the BBC in 2013, "Al-Jazeera network remains the standard bearer for the Islamist position."

=== Satellite disruption ===
During the 2010 FIFA World Cup opening game, Al Jazeera Sports' transmission to the Arab world went down without explanation in the first half; second-half transmission was patchy. Al Jazeera and FIFA said that they were working to figure out the cause of the disruption of Al Jazeera's broadcast rights. According to a report in The Guardian, evidence indicated jamming by the Jordanian government.

=== Death of Tareq Ayyoub ===
Al Jazeera's Baghdad office was hit by a missile fired by an American ground-attack aircraft on 8 April 2003, killing reporter Tareq Ayyoub and wounding another person. Al Jazeera reported that it had mailed the coordinates of its office to the US State Department six weeks earlier. The New York Times reported on 30 January 2005 that the Qatari government, under pressure from the Bush administration, was planning to sell Al Jazeera.

=== Bombing memo ===
The UK tabloid Daily Mirror reported on 22 November 2005 that it had obtained a leaked memo from 10 Downing Street that US President George W. Bush had considered bombing Al Jazeera's Doha headquarters in April 2004, when United States Marines were conducting a contentious assault on Fallujah.

=== Detention of Sami al-Hajj ===
Al Jazeera cameraman Sami al-Hajj, a Sudanese national, was detained en route to Afghanistan in December 2001 and held without charge as an enemy combatant in Camp Delta of the Guantanamo Bay detention camp until May 2008. The reasons for his detention remain unknown, although the official US position on all detainees is that they are security threats. Reporters Without Borders repeatedly expressed concern about al-Hajj's detention, mentioning him in its annual Press Freedom Index and circulating a petition for his release.

Clive Stafford Smith, al-Hajj's lawyer, reported on 23 November 2005 that US officials had asked his client in 125 of 130 interviews if Al Jazeera was a front for al-Qaeda. After his release, al-Hajj expressed plans to sue US President George W. Bush for his treatment at Guantanamo. According to Stafford Smith, his accusations include beatings and sexual assault.

Al-Hajj was released on 1 May 2008 from Guantanamo Bay and flown to Sudan, arriving in Khartoum on a US military plane early on 2 May. Al Jazeera broadcast video in which he was carried into a hospital on a stretcher, looking frail but smiling and surrounded by well-wishers.

=== "The Dark Side: Secrets of the Sports Dopers" ===
Al Jazeera English and Al Jazeera America broadcast "The Dark Side: Secrets of the Sports Dopers", an episode of Al Jazeera Investigates examining professional athletes' possible use of performance-enhancing drugs (PEDs), on 27 December 2015. Peyton Manning and other prominent athletes were identified as having received drugs from Charles Sly, a pharmacist who had worked at the Guyer Anti-Aging Clinic in Indianapolis in the fall of 2011.

The Huffington Post leaked the episode a day before Al Jazeera's broadcast. In a Sunday NFL Countdown interview with ESPN's Lisa Salters on the morning of 27 December, Manning called the documentary "completely fabricated" and "garbage" and expressed anger about his wife being mentioned in the story. When Salters noted that other athletes had first denied and then admitted allegations, Manning said that he could not speak for others. He said that he had visited the Guyer clinic 35 times in 2011 and received medication and treatment.

Sly recanted his story and requested that the report not be aired via a YouTube video. Although Sly later said that he had never seen the Mannings and told ESPN's Chris Mortensen that he is not a pharmacist and was not at the Guyer institute in 2011 (as Al Jazeera reported), state licensing records indicate that a Charles David Sly was licensed as a pharmacy intern in Indiana from April 2010 to 1 May 2013.

Manning hired former George W. Bush press secretary Ari Fleischer to manage the issue, and threatened to sue Al Jazeera. On 5 January 2016, it was announced that Ryan Howard and Ryan Zimmerman were suing Al Jazeera for defamation after the documentary aired. In January 2021 attorneys for Al Jazeera Media presented sealed evidence in court, which they said supported their original report. In 2023, the case was dismissed with prejudice when both players dropped their claims.

=== Website attacks ===
Immediately after its launch in 2003, the English site was attacked by one or several hackers, who launched denial-of-service attacks, and another hacker who redirected visitors to a site featuring a Flag of the United States. Both events were widely reported as Al Jazeera's website having been attacked by "hackers". In November 2003, John William Racine II, also known as 'John Buffo', was sentenced to 1,000 hours of community service and a $1,500 U.S. fine for the online disruption. Racine posed as an Al Jazeera employee to get a password to the network's site, then redirected visitors to a page he created that showed an American flag shaped like a U.S. map and a patriotic motto, court documents said. In June 2003, Racine pleaded guilty to wire fraud and unlawful interception of an electronic communication. As of 2012, the perpetrators of the denial-of-service attacks remain unknown.

=== Shariah and Life ===
Shariah and Life (al-Sharīʿa wa al-Ḥayāh) is an Al Jazeera Arabic show with an estimated audience of 60 million worldwide and stars Muslim preacher Yusuf al-Qaradawi, who is described as "Islam's Spiritual 'Dear Abby'". The format of Shariah and Life is similar to that of al-Qaradawi's earlier programing on Qatar TV as well as Egyptian television shows going as far back as the 1960s. Programs interpreting the Quran or dealing with religious issues were popular from Morocco to Saudi Arabia. The now defunct show has been the repeated subject of controversy. In January 2009, Qaradawi stated: "Throughout history, Allah has imposed upon the [Jews] people who would punish them for their corruption. The last punishment was carried out by [Adolf] Hitler." In October 2010, Qaradawi was asked if Muslims should acquire nuclear weapons "to terrorize their enemies." Qaradawi said he was pleased Pakistan had such a weapon, that the goal of nuclear weapons would be permissible, and provided religious justification quoting Qur'anic verses urging Muslims "to terrorize thereby the enemy of God and your enemy."

=== Censorship of documentary about slavery in the Muslim world ===
In August 2018, it was reported that Al Jazeera had censored the documentary series Rotas da Escravatura (Slavery Routes), a joint European series by French channel Arte, Portuguese RTP and LX Filmes. The entire first episode (of four), which dealt with "the process that led the Muslim Empire to enduringly weave an immense network of slave trade across Africa, the Middle East and Asia" was deleted. In return, the television network claimed that slavery in Africa was a practice founded by the Portuguese.

=== Bullying and harassment of staff ===
In 2022, several staff alleged that there was bullying and harassment at Al Jazeera. The allegations emerged after veteran broadcaster Kamahl Santamaria abruptly quit his job at New Zealand state broadcaster TVNZ amid harassment complaints, shortly after he moved there from Al Jazeera. A BBC investigation found he had been the subject of multiple complaints at Al Jazeera before moving to New Zealand, and that Al Jazeera staff had also accused other senior employees of harassment or bullying. It was claimed that this behaviour was tolerated at Al Jazeera.

== See also ==
- BBC controversies
- CBS News controversies and criticism
- CNN controversies
- Fox News controversies
- MSNBC controversies
- List of The New York Times controversies
- Radio Televisyen Malaysia controversies
