= Human rights in Egypt under the Supreme Council of the Armed Forces =

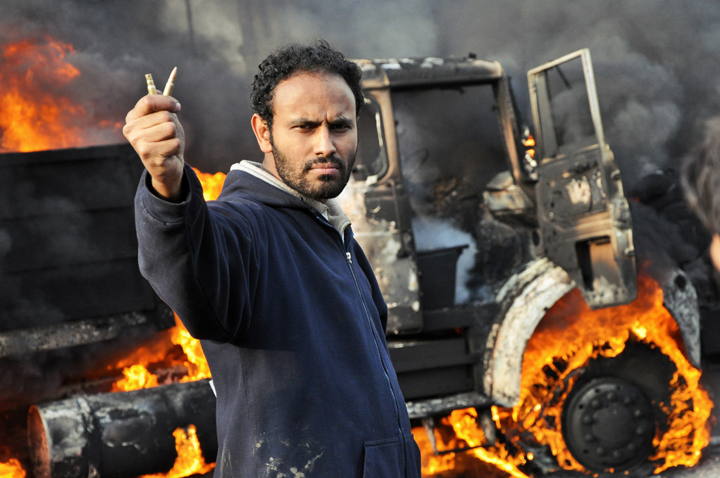
An army truck burns in the background as a man holds up unfired ammunition and an alleged live ammunition casing fired by the army personnel.

Human rights in the post-Mubarak transition have been the subject of concern and controversy since the 2011 Egyptian revolution. The Supreme Council of the Armed Forces (SCAF, Arabic: المجلس الأعلى للقوات المسلحة, al-Maǧlis al-ʾAʿlā lil-Quwwāt al-Musallaḥah) in particular has been the focus of concerns about human rights violations. The SCAF, which consists of 20 senior officers in the Egyptian military, was handed the power to govern Egypt after the ouster of President Hosni Mubarak on 11 February 2011 as a consequence of the revolution.

== Torture ==
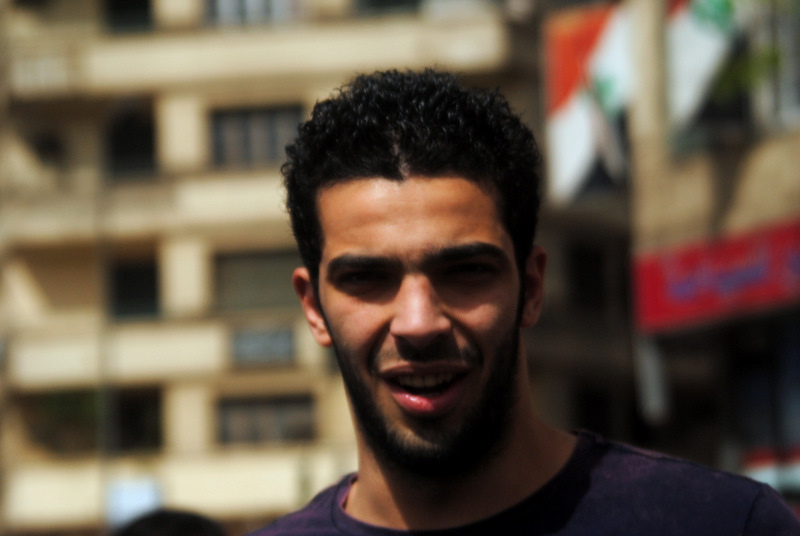
Ramy Essam

Ramy Essam, a 23-year-old Egyptian student and musician, was arrested and tortured by the army police on 9 March 2011. He was one of more than 100 people arrested when the army, without warning, stormed the square, ripping down tents. Essam says men in army uniforms dragged him to the Egyptian National Museum, which had become a security headquarters, and took him to a courtyard, stripped him to his shorts, and started torturing him. "They used sticks, metal rods, wires, whips." He said he also received electric shocks. "There was a soldier who would jump in the air and land on my face with his legs". Ramy Essam is best known as "the singer of the Egyptian revolution" due to his popular music during the Egyptian uprising against Hosni Mubarak. And currently he sings songs against the SCAF.

== Virginity testing ==
External videos
- Egyptian army denies 'virginity tests' on YouTube
- Salwa's testimony, who was arrested by the army on 9 March 2011 on YouTube

Since the overthrow of Mubarak there have been widespread reports of detained Egyptian women having their "virginity checked" by a male officer or doctor. Numerous journalists and released prisoners and protesters have confirmed the practice, by which Egyptian officers were said to evaluate whether or not these women had been raped. The Egyptian military initially denied any virginity checks taking place and then asserted the practice would not continue in the future. News of the virginity tests sparked a public outcry from Amnesty International and Human Rights Watch as well as local Egyptian activists, Mona Seif for example, and other citizens in the country. Protesters see the tests as evidence that more reform is needed and that the rule under SCAF is neither stable nor trustworthy.

== Military trials ==
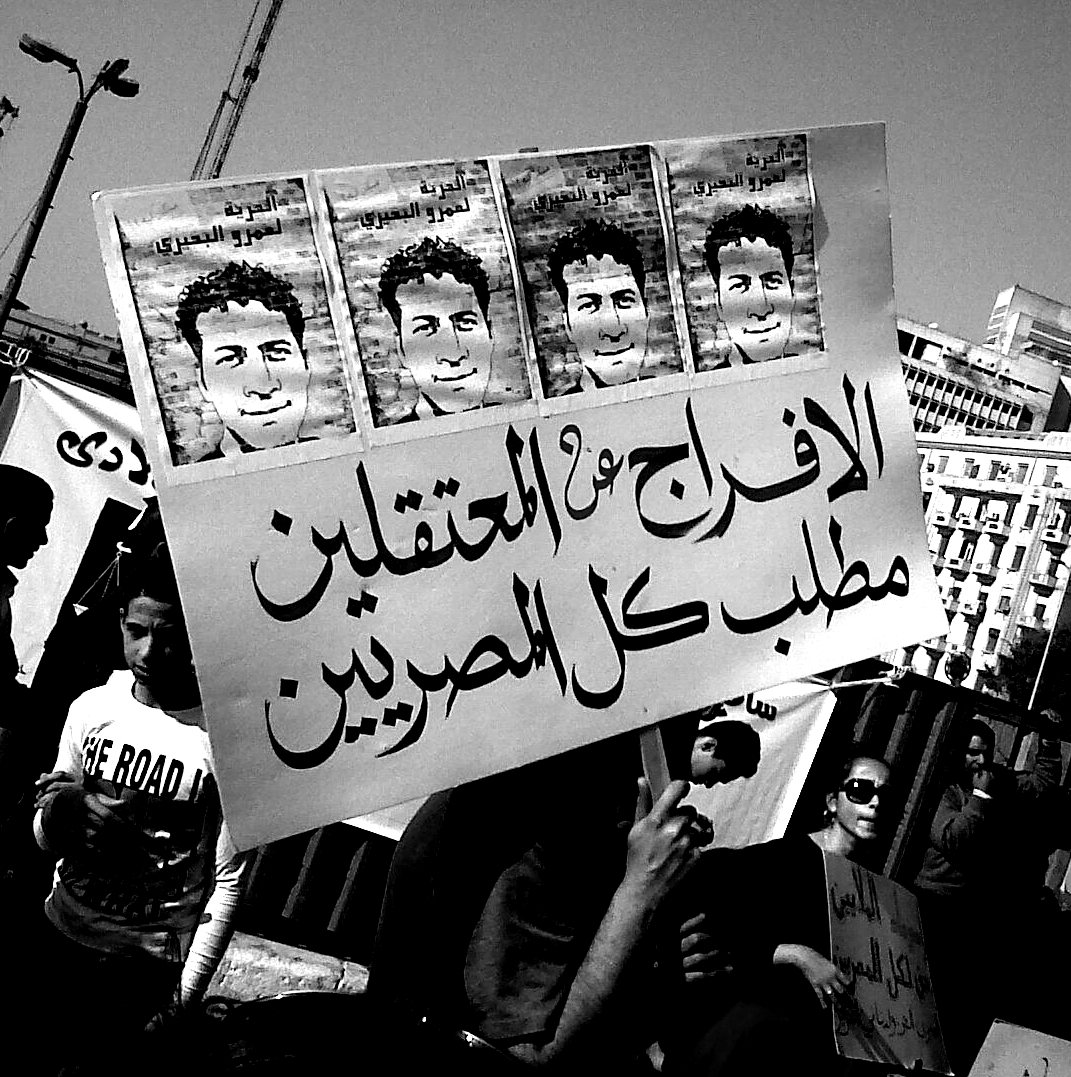
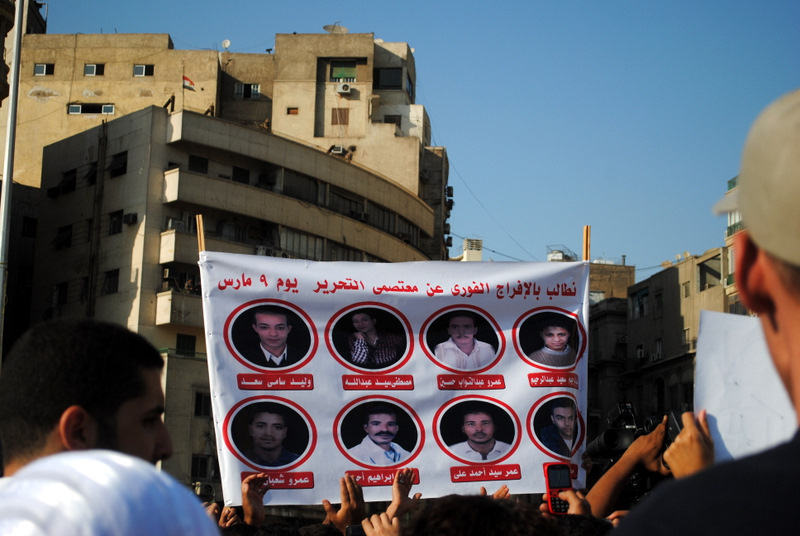
Amr El Beheiry and some of the 9 March detainees

From 28 January 2011 when the military replaced the police in patrolling streets in Egypt, to 10 September 2011 some 12,000 civilians have been arrested and brought before military tribunals—more than the total number of civilians who faced military trials during the 30-year rule of Hosni Mubarak. Of the 11,879 civilians tried tribunals convicted 8,071, including 1,836 suspended sentences. 1,225 more convictions are awaiting ratification by the military. Only 795 were acquitted.

Before the revolution, military trials were reserved for high-profile political cases, such as the 2008 conviction of the former deputy guide of the Muslim Brotherhood, Khairat el-Shater; cases in which the defendants had been arrested in a military zone such as the Sinai; or civilians who had criticized the military.

According to Human Rights Watch, proceedings in Egypt's military courts, lack "basic due process rights and do not satisfy the requirements of independence and impartiality of courts of law". Defendants "usually do not have access to counsel of their own choosing and judges do not respect the rights of defense. Judges in the military justice system "do not enjoy the independence to ignore instructions by superiors" because they "subject to a chain of command".

Among the civilians who were tried include Amr El Beheiry, was arrested during a violent military dispersal of a sit-in at the parliament on 26 February. He was then referred to military court and after a swift trial without the presence of an attorney, and received a sentence of five years on thuggery charges despite the testimonies of many eyewitnesses who said he broke no laws. Amnesty International also has called for Beheiry's release.

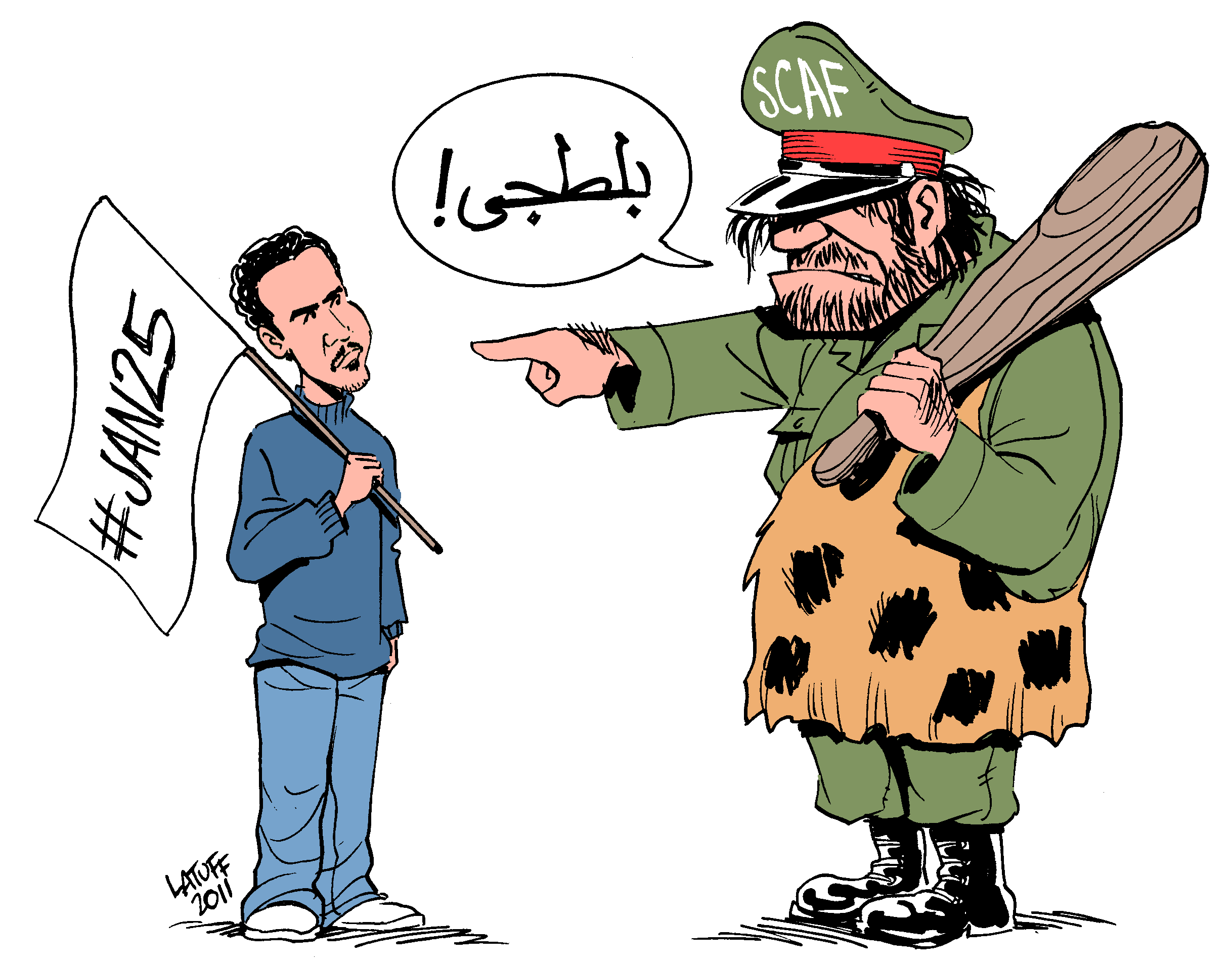
"A SCAF's cave man accusing a 25 Jan. youth (Loai Nagati) of being thug", by Carlos Latuff, 2011

Another activist that has been detained is Loai Nagati. The We are all Khaled Said Facebook page said: "Loai Nagati is a 21 years old Egyptian Activist who got arrested during Tahrir protests yesterday morning. As it has become the norm now, Loai has been sent to 15 days in a military jail awaiting a military investigation! Loai didn't have a lawyer, has no clear accusation against him & is a computer science student. He is a civilian & shouldn't be investigated by military prosecuters. End military trials of civilians in Egypt NOW! 45 protesters have been arrested so far during Tahrir protests on 28 June night & 29 June morning. All sent to military trials." An active Tweeter, Nagati was Tweeting (@LoaiNagati) from Tahrir Square about what was taking place when he was arrested. "Several people are injured," was the last tweet by Nagati at 7 am on Wednesday. Nagati is to be detained for 15 days and was transferred on 29 June to military prison pending a military trial. Nagati has a heart condition as well as digestive problems which require 10 different medications, and after some struggle, an officer who works at the prison agreed to the transfer of the medication to Nagati.

Asmaa Mahfouz was arrested on charges of defaming the Egyptian military junta for calling them a "council of dogs". She was referred to a military court, prompting activists, as well as presidential hopefuls such as Mohamed ElBaradei and Ayman Nour, to protest her being charged in a military court. Mahfouz was released on bail in the amount of E£20,000, equivalent to approximately US$3,350.

== Firing on demonstrations ==
At the Israeli Embassy in Cairo on 15 May thousands gathered for a pro-Palestinian demonstration but were dispersed by Egyptian security and the army police forces with tear gas and live ammunition. Some 353 protesters were injured and 180 arrested. At least two of the wounded had been shot in head and chest by security and army police forces, and at least two of those arrested (Mosa'ab Elshamy and Tarek Shalaby) were well known for their Twitter activity throughout the 2011 Egyptian revolution. All those who were arrested faced military trials and were later freed.

== Censorship ==
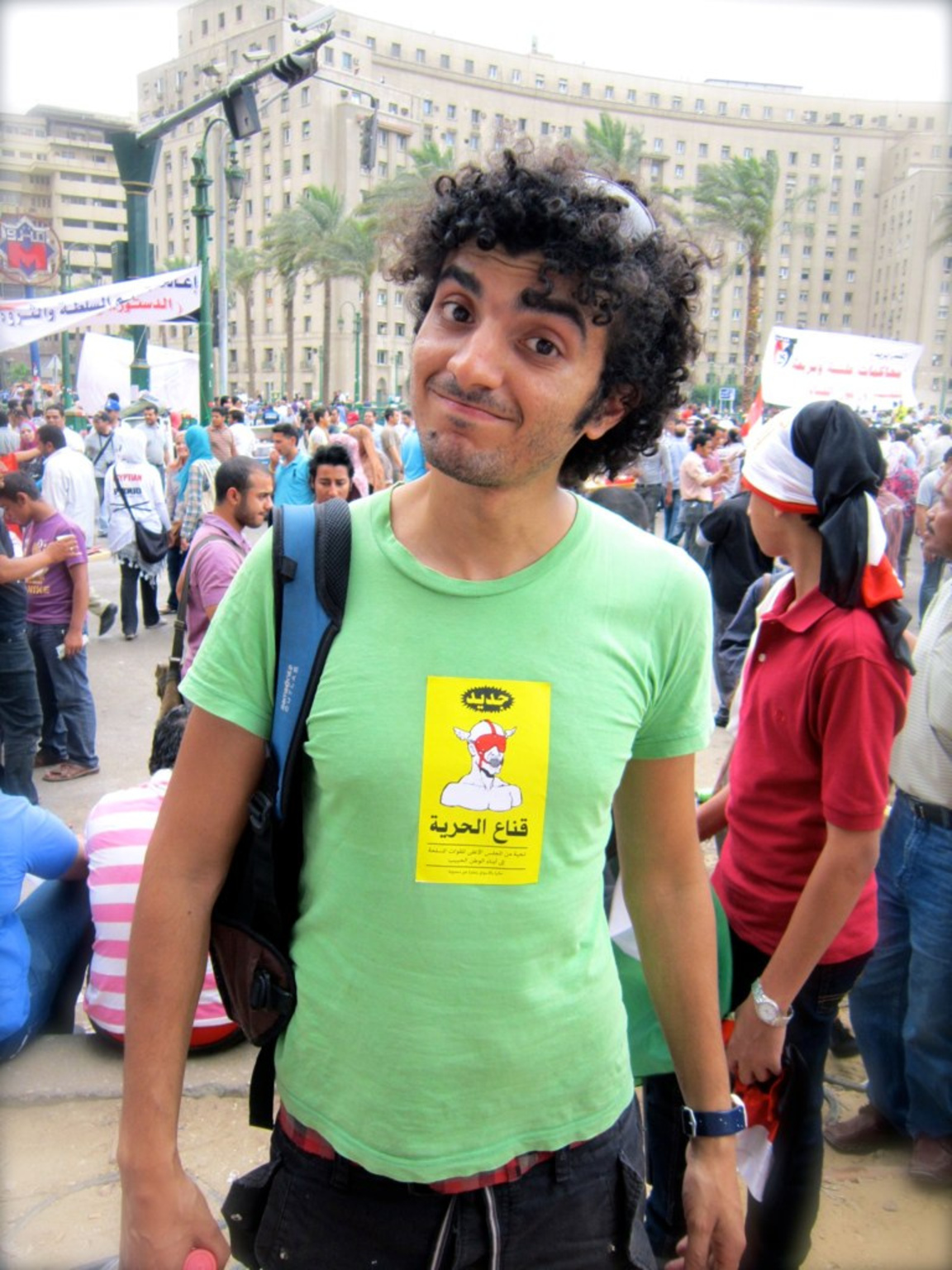
Mohammed Fahmy AKA Ganzeer, the graffiti artist who designed the sticker on the T-shirt and was arrested for posting it in Tahrir Square.

Graffiti artist Ganzeer, film director Aida El-Kashef, and musician/painter Nadim Amin AKA NadimX were arrested for posting a poster that offended the military police. They were released later that day. "I don't know why we were transferred to the military prosecution" said graffiti artist Mohamed Fahmy, a 29-year-old Egyptian artist, who goes by Ganzeer on Twitter, minutes after his release. He said that in custody he and others talked about "politics and democracy".

Another activist who was detained after Mubarak's ousting was Maikel Nabil Sanad, a political activist and blogger. In April 2009 he founded the No to Compulsory Military Service movement. He declared his conscientious objection, demanding to be exempted from military service. Instead, he was arrested on 12 November 2010 by military police but was released two days later, and finally exempted from service on medical grounds. Sanad participated actively in the Egyptian revolution, highlighting the fact that Egypt has effectively been ruled by the military for six decades. He was arrested on 4 February by military police and tortured, but released 27 hours later. He was arrested in his home in the Ain Shams neighbourhood in Cairo at about 10 pm on 28 March 2011 by military police. He was only able to call his brother the next day to inform him of his arrest. Sanad was sentenced to three years imprisonment on charges of "insulting the military" in his post "The Army and The People Were Never One Hand" on maikelnabil.com by the 10th of Ramadan military court in Nasr City near Cairo on 10 April. Before this, he was imprisoned in a special punishment cell at El Marg prison, which did not allow him any sunlight. In addition, his cellmates threatened him. Sanad demanded a doctor, as he suffers from unstable blood pressure and needs regular medication and medical attention.

Egyptian blogger and activist Hossam el-Hamalawy, television host Reem Maged, and journalist Nabil Sharaf El-Din was given a summons on 30 May 2011 to appear before military prosecution after Maged brought Hamalawy on her show where he criticized the role of the military police, holding the head of the military police responsible for torturing activists. They were released Tuesday after "chatting" with Military Prosecution and Hossam el-Hamalawy was asked to hand in reports of army abuses to authorities.

Egyptian journalist and activist Rasha Azab and El Fagr newspaper editor-in-chief Adel Hammouda have been summoned by the military prosecution. They are to appear before military prosecutors on 19 June 2011. Azab had published an article in El Fagr newspaper detailing the meeting that took place between members of the Supreme Council of the Armed Forces (SCAF) and the No to Military Trials campaigners.

== Deaths ==
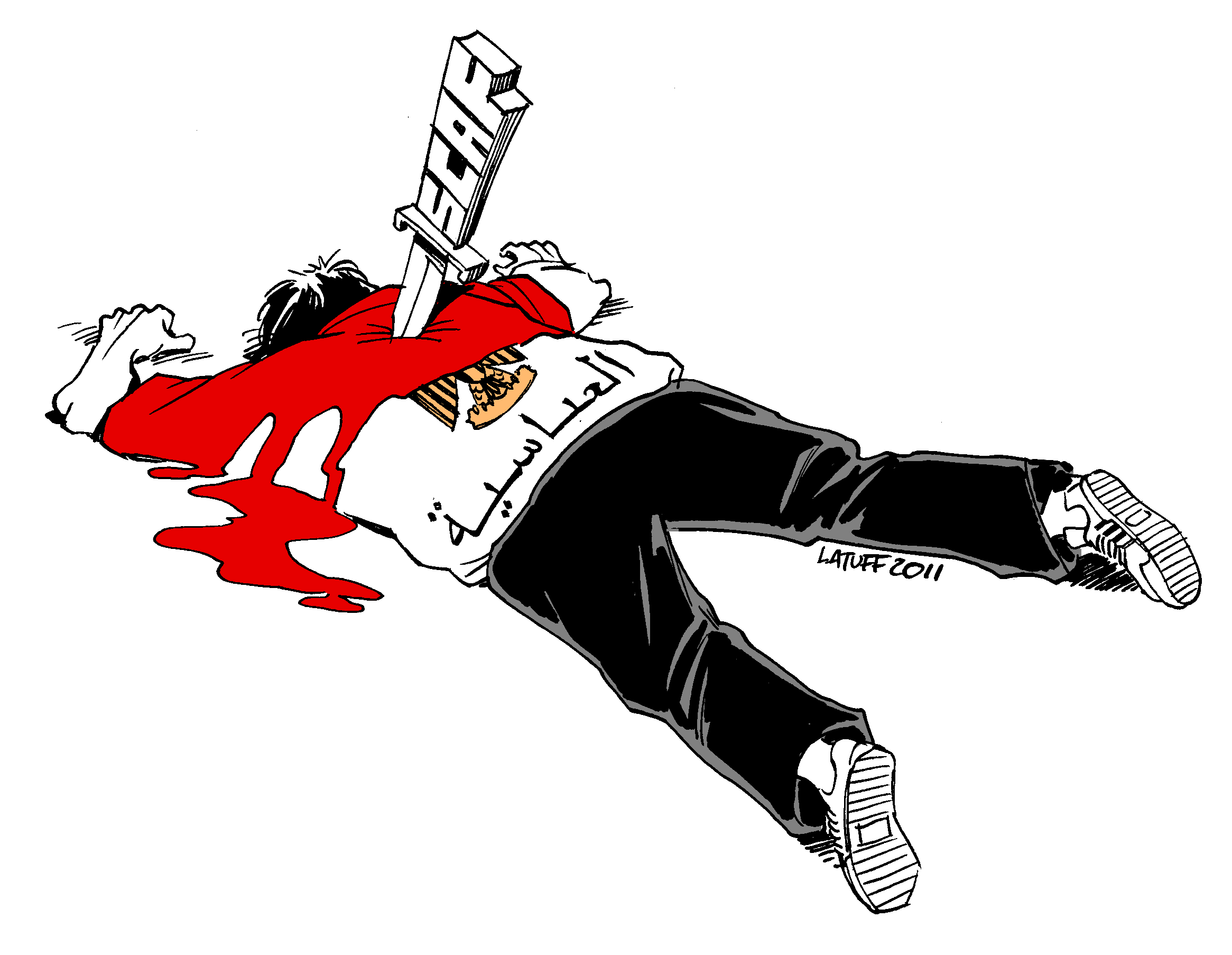
Poster for Mohamed Mohsen, another victim of the SCAF, artwork by Carlos Latuff

Ramy Fakhry, a 27-year-old electrical engineer, died as a result of bullet wounds received at an army checkpoint somewhere in the governorate of Damietta. The checkpoint's exact location is unknown. According to one, unconfirmed, version of events, Fakhry stopped his car just short of the checkpoint when he saw a gunfight between the army and assailants ahead of him and was shot three times in the back as he attempted to drive away. Another version of the story says he left the rig where he worked near Damietta on Friday 13 May to attend a wedding. On his way back later that night at 1 am – before the curfew imposed at the time – Fakhry was shot dead at an army checkpoint. A candlelight vigil was organized by Ramy's family and friends on 14 May 2011. Head of the Supreme Council for Armed Force (SCAF), Field Marshal Hussein Tantawi, ordered an investigation into the killing of Ramy Fakhry. The statement has not been followed up with any updates concerning the investigation, prompting the call for action. Whatever the circumstances activists believe that Fakhry was killed by the army.

On 4 August, Mohamed Mohsen, a protester and an activist, died at Nasser Hospital Institute, 12 days after he was hit with a rock that caused him brain hemorrhage. Mohsen had participated in a march on 23 July heading to the Ministry of Defense in denouncement of SCAF, which was stopped at the neighborhood of Abbasseya by military troops. Thereafter, the entire march was attacked by thugs, and allegedly by the residents of Abbasseya as well, who threw rocks and molotov cocktails at the protesters. One eyewitness said Mohsen was hit by a rock from a nearby rooftop, which made it likely that he was indeed hit by a resident of the area. Protesters were unable to have him hospitalized for over two hours, as ambulances couldn't reach the march, which was surrounded by military police, and he was not taken to the nearby Demerdash Hospital because of rumors that injured protesters were being arrested. After several other hospitals refused to take him in he was eventually admitted at the Nasser Hospital. The lag between his injury and hospitalization as well as apparently very poor health care eventually led to Mohsen's death. Protesters blamed SCAF for his death, as it was believed the attacks against the march came at the incitement and fear-mongering of the military, and specifically put the blame on Major General Hassan el-Ruweiny. A large funeral was held for him in his home city of Aswan, and around 200 protesters held a funeral at a mosque near Tahrir Square, after Friday Prayers. It was blocked from entering the square by military police and Central Security Forces. Later during the day, protesters had a Ramadan iftar in the square in a celebratory manner, but soon afterwards were attacked and dispersed by military police after claiming they were planning on renewing the sit-in in Tahrir.

== See also ==
- Human rights in Egypt
- Human rights violations in the 2011 Libyan civil war
