= 2011 Libyan rape allegations =

External media

Audio
- Gaddafi accused of ordering mass rape, ABC News

Video
- UN suspects Gaddafi approved mass-rape policy, Euronews
- Gaddafi ordered mass rape, ICC prosecutor says, France 24
- Gaddafi accused of using rape as weapon, BBC
- Allegations Qaddafi Gave Troops Viagra-Like Medicine, Ordered Them to Rape Thousands of Women, Fox News
- Gaddafi Soldiers Given Viagra and Condoms for Rape?, Newsy.com
- Gaddafi forces accused of rape, AlJazeera
- Libya troops using rape as a weapon?, CNN
- Gadhafi troops of mass rape, CNN

The 2011 Libyan rape allegations were controversial allegations that Gaddafi's forces in Libya were committing mass rape during the 2011 Libyan civil war. Prosecutor of the International Criminal Court Luis Moreno Ocampo said "we have information that there was a policy to rape in Libya those who were against the government." Libyan psychologist Seham Sergiwa said she distributed questionnaires in opposition-held areas and along the Libya–Tunisia border, and 259 women responded that they were raped. Sergiwa told Amnesty International's specialist on Libya that she had lost contact with the 140 victims she interviewed and was unable to provide documentary evidence. In March 2011, Iman al-Obeidi said she was gang-raped before Libyan security services dragged her away.

Investigations by Amnesty International, Human Rights Watch and Doctors Without Borders did not find evidence that mass rapes had occurred. Amnesty International's senior crisis response adviser said although no evidence was found, this did not prove that mass rape did not occur, but it also could not establish that it did, either. Amnesty did find that, in many cases, rebels had made false claims about abuse by Gadaffi's soldiers. UN investigator M. Cherif Bassiouni described the claims as "massive hysteria".

== 2011 allegations ==
Allegations arose in 2011 that Viagra and other impotency drugs were being distributed by Gaddafi to sustain the rapes. The charges were denied by Libyan diplomats and described as propaganda. Libyan psychologist Seham Sergiwa reported a wide pattern of rapes by Libyan government soldiers during the 2011 conflict. In June 2011, the International Criminal Court began an investigation into the rape allegations seeking to add the rapes to Gaddafi's list of war crimes charges.

United States secretary of state Hillary Clinton, stated that "rape, physical intimidation, sexual harassment, and even so-called 'virginity tests' have taken place in countries throughout the region." Clinton also stated that "It is an affront to all people who are yearning to live in a society free from violence with respect for basic human rights. We urge all governments to conduct immediate, transparent investigations into these allegations, and to hold accountable those found responsible."

In April 2011 NBC News reported that United States ambassador, Susan Rice, told a closed-door meeting of officials at the UN that the Libyan military is using rape as a weapon in the war with the rebels and some had been issued the anti-impotency drug. United States military and intelligence officials informed NBC News under condition of anonymity that there was no evidence for the allegations of systematic rape.

Patrick Cockburn expressed concern that misleading reports of rapes by Libyan government forces were used to justify the NATO-led 2011 military intervention in Libya. Amnesty International said many false reports that Libyan forces committed rape had been spread as disinformation by rebel forces, and that it could not find a "single victim of rape or a doctor who knew about somebody being raped". In June 2011, a UN investigator did not find evidence of mass rapes, and branded the claims as "hysteria".

== Post-war ==
There's some information with Viagra. So, it's like a machete. It's new. Viagra is a tool of massive rape.

— Luis Moreno Ocampo, ICC Chief Prosecutor

After the civil war, Luis Moreno-Ocampo, prosecutor for the International Criminal Court, said there was evidence that Gaddafi told soldiers to rape women who had spoken out against his government.

In 2014, the new Libyan government said that compensation should be paid for the victims of rape during the war.

In 2016, there were reports that African women were being raped by the same Libyan rebels who overthrew Gadhafi. This is part of a larger picture of abuse of black Africans in Libya that is emerging in the wake of the rebel victory, born of allegations that Gadhafi often hired sub-Saharan Africans to fight for him.

In 2019, leaked phone calls by Gaddafi government officials were claimed by The Libya Observer as evidence that Baghdadi Mahmudi, prime minister of Libya from 2006 to 2011, had coordinated systematic rapes.

== See also ==
- Wartime sexual violence
- Human rights violations in the 2011 Libyan Civil War
- Al Jazeera controversies#Libya
- Embedded feminism – Concept in feminism

== Bibliography ==
- Blundy, David; Lycett, Andrew (1987). Qaddafi and the Libyan Revolution. Boston: Little Brown & Co. ISBN 978-0-316-10042-7.
- Harris, Lillian Craig (1986). Libya: Qadhafi's Revolution and the Modern State. Boulder, Colorado: Westview Press. ISBN 978-0-8133-0075-7.
