= Ian Lee =

Ian Lee may refer to:

- Ian Lee (cricketer), Australian cricketer
- Ian Lee (journalist), American journalist
- Ian Lee (politician), Canadian politician

== See also ==
- Iain Lee, comedian and presenter
