= Sue Turton =

British journalist

Susan Melanie Turton (born c.1966) is a British television journalist.

== Career ==
Sue Turton began her national television career as a reporter in the features department at Sky News. She went on to freelance for LWT and MTV before getting a correspondent's job at the new breakfast programme GMTV. She covered the north of England, landing an exclusive with the whistle-blower in the Bruce Grobbelaar football scandal. She went back to freelancing in 1997 with Sky and ITV before joining Channel 4 News in 1998. She worked for the programme as both presenter and correspondent for 12 years. Sue won RTS Awards and covered different disciplines, including sports news, breaking stories, investigations and foreign affairs.

After leaving Channel 4, she joined Al Jazeera English, where she became the station's first Afghanistan correspondent. Ten months later, she was transferred to the Middle East to report on the Arab Spring. In this capacity, she covered the uprisings in Libya, Syria and Egypt, as well as reporting extensively from Iraq and Lebanon.

As a result of Al Jazeera's reporting of the Egypt uprising, Turton was one of several journalists from the station falsely convicted in 2014 of aiding and abetting a terrorist organisation. The news of the initial charges was announced on Al Jazeera English by Turton herself, who happened to be presenting a live bulletin when the news broke. The journalists received sentences of between seven and ten years. Turton, who was tried in absentia, led the campaign to have her three imprisoned colleagues freed. They were successful in doing this, but most of their convictions still stand.

Turton was forced to leave her job with Al Jazeera in June 2015 following her conviction, as it had required her to travel to countries that had extradition treaties with Egypt; however, she later returned to the channel as a studio presenter in London. She now produces and directs documentaries for channels all over the world. Her latest projects include films on the Paris attacks, Abu Sayyaf in the Philippines and school street brawls in Indonesia.
