= India ... Who Lit the Fuse? =

Qatari TV documentary

- Genre: Documentary
- Country of origin: Qatar
- Original language: English

Production
- Producer: Jamie Doran
- Production location: India
- Production company: Clover Films

Original release
- Network: Al Jazeera

India … Who Lit the Fuse? is a documentary produced by Clover Films for Al Jazeera's Point Blank investigation series.

== Background ==
The documentary investigates the activities of Hindu nationalist groups like the Rashtriya Swayamsevak Sangh (RSS), which is closely associated with India's ruling Bharatiya Janata Party (BJP). It portrays the alleged challenges faced by India's Muslim minority in light of hate speeches and attacks by Hindutva leaders.

However, an Indian court has issued an order preventing Al Jazeera from broadcasting this documentary. The Allahabad High Court in Uttar Pradesh state has prohibited Al Jazeera from airing the documentary, citing concerns that it could have negative consequences.
