= Mohamed Fahmy (journalist) =

Egyptian-Canadian journalist

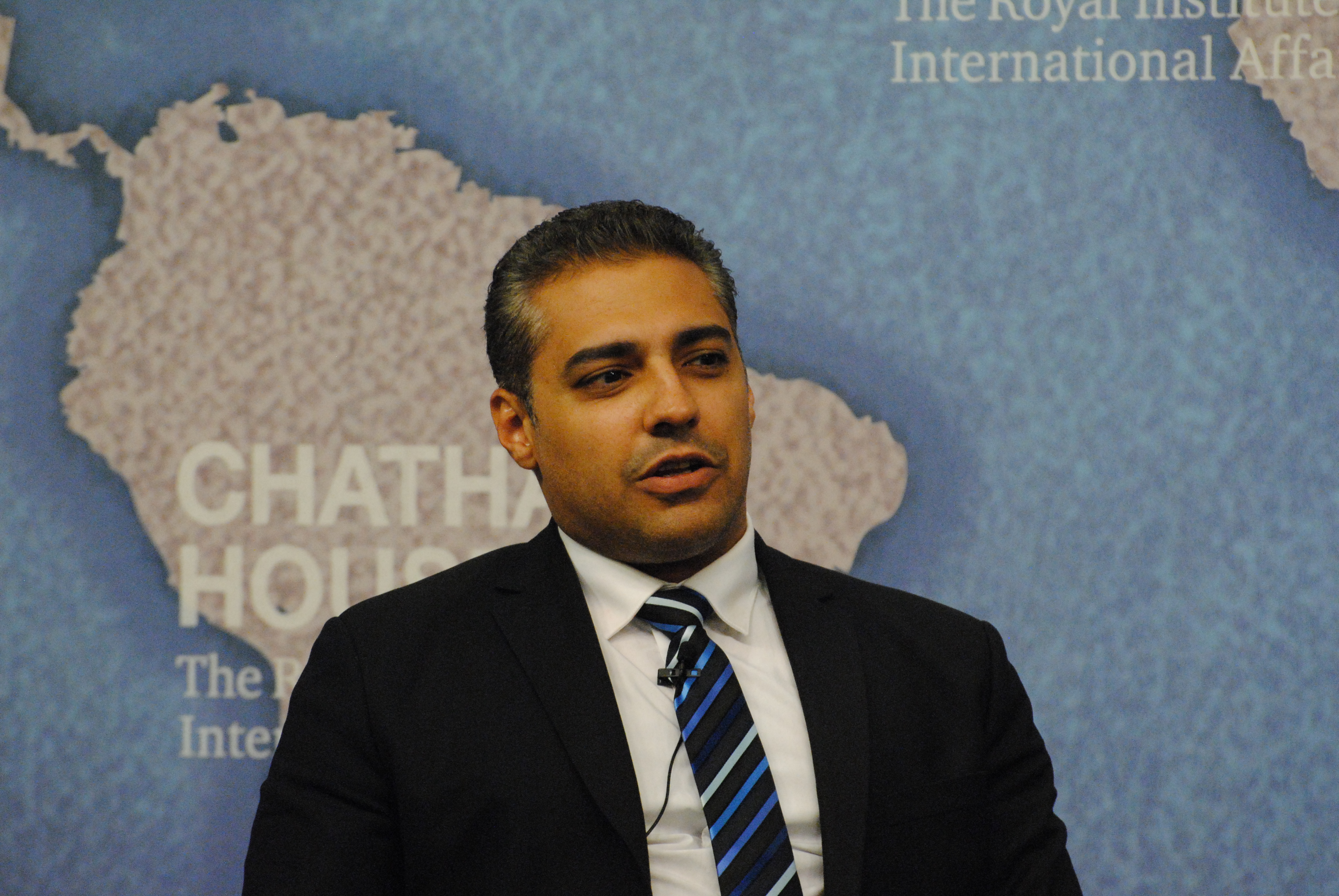
- Fahmy in 2015
- Born: Mohamed Fadel Fahmy; Cairo, Egypt
- Citizenship: Canadian
- Occupations: Journalist, author
- Years active: 1999–present
- Notable credit(s): CNN Freedom Project "Death in the Desert" "Egyptian Freedom Story" "Marriott Cell"

Mohamed Fadel Fahmy (Arabic: محمد فاضل فهمي pronounced [mæˈħæmmæd ˈfɑːdˤel ˈfæhmi]) is an Egyptian-born Canadian journalist, war correspondent, and author. He has worked extensively in the Middle East and North Africa, for CNN, BBC, and Al Jazeera English. He became internationally known after being detained by Egyptian authorities in 2013, until being pardoned two years later.

Fahmy covered the Iraq War in 2003 for the Los Angeles Times and entered Iraq on the first day of the war from Kuwait. Upon completion of his one-year mission, he authored his first book, Baghdad Bound. He covered the Arab Spring in 2011.

In September 2013, Fahmy accepted a new post as the Al Jazeera English International Bureau Chief based in Egypt. On 29 December 2013, he and two fellow Al Jazeera English journalists, Peter Greste and Baher Mohamed, were arrested by Egyptian authorities. On 23 June 2014, Fahmy was found guilty by a Cairo Criminal Court and sentenced to seven years of incarceration at the Tora Prison, a maximum-security prison. On 1 January 2015, the Egyptian Court of Appeals announced a retrial for Fahmy, Mohamed, and Greste. Release on bail was not allowed. Fahmy renounced his Egyptian citizenship on 3 February 2015 to benefit from a presidential executive order allowing the deportation of foreign prisoners. His colleague Peter Greste was deported to Australia. On 12 February 2015, both Fahmy and Baher Mohamed were released on bail and referred to a six-month-long retrial. On 29 August 2015, Fahmy, Mohamed, and Greste each received three-year sentences from the retrial judge. Greste was sentenced in absentia. On 23 September 2015, it was reported that Fahmy was pardoned by the Egyptian President Abdel Fattah al-Sisi. In a BBC HARDtalk interview shortly after his release, he criticised Al Jazeera English's decision to take the Egyptian Government to court for cancelling its network licence. He also confirmed that he is suing Al Jazeera English for "100 million dollars" for "damages." President al-Sisi restored his Egyptian citizenship on 10 June 2016.

Fahmy started his new job as an adjunct professor at the University of British Columbia upon winning his freedom and returning to Vancouver, Canada. He authored a book about his imprisonment in Egypt titled The Marriott Cell: An Epic Journey from Cairo's Scorpion prison to Freedom. The book was adapted into a screenplay written by Michael Bronner.

== Early life ==
Fahmy was born in Egypt.

== Career ==
=== 2011 Egyptian Revolution ===
Fahmy reported live from the scene of the Israeli Embassy protest in Cairo in September 2011 and protected an American PBS NewsHour crew and senior correspondent Margaret Warner from angry Egyptians who were protesting Israeli attacks on Egyptian soldiers.

He authored "Egyptian Freedom Story" in 2011 which included 200 photos to document the January 25th Revolution.

A Peabody Award was granted to Fahmy in 2011 for his contribution to the CNN coverage of the Arab Spring.

=== Arab Spring ===
In his role with CNN, he reported extensively on the fall of Hosni Mubarak during the January 25th revolution and on the Syrian uprising. He traveled to Libya during the early days of the revolution in 2011 and reported on the hunt for dictator Gaddafi, the formation of a transitional government and the rise of extremism.

In 2012, he covered the elections that brought the Muslim Brotherhood to power in Egypt and was the first western journalist to interview Mohamed Al Zawahiri, the brother of the Al Qaeda leader upon his release from prison.

=== Journalism Awards ===
- Tom Renner Investigative Reporting Award in 2011 for producing Death in the Desert broadcast on the CNN Freedom Project program. The film was singled out from 450 entries after it highlighted the magnitude of the illegal human trafficking operations run by gangs in the Sinai who kidnap and torture Sub-Saharan Africans looking to immigrate to Israel through Sinai.
- Peabody Award for contribution to the CNN Coverage of the Arab Spring in 2011.
- Canadian Commission World Press Freedom Award and a certificate from the UNESCO on World Press Freedom Day in 2014.
- Royal Television Journalism Judges' Award announced in London in February 2015.
- Australia's Voltaire award for free speech in 2015.
- International Association of Press Clubs Freedom of Speech Award in 2015.
- Writers Union of Canada: Freedom to Read Award in 2016.
- British Columbia Civil Liberties Association's Liberty Awards for exceptional contributions to human rights and civil liberties in 2016.

=== Philanthropy ===
He registered and launched the Fahmy Foundation nongovernmental organisation based in Vancouver during his imprisonment to advocate for and financially support journalists, photographers, and prisoners of conscience imprisoned worldwide.

Fahmy Foundation partnered with Amnesty International in writing a Protection Charter presented to Prime Minister Justin Trudeau and the liberal government in Ottawa. The document entails 12 practical steps for the government to reform and strengthen its mechanisms to protect Canadian citizens, permanent residents, journalists, and individuals with close Canadian connections from serious human rights violations in other countries.

=== Al Jazeera English ===
On 5 May 2015 Mohamed Fahmy sued Al-Jazeera for $100 million Canadian dollars ($83m; £53m) in a British Columbia court. The punitive and remedial damages are demanded for alleged negligence and breach of contract. He accuses the network of "negligence" by misinforming him about its legal status and their safety in Egypt.

== Egyptian trial ==
On January 29, 2014, it emerged that the Egyptian authorities were to charge 20 defendants in the case including Fahmy.

On 20 February 2014, Fahmy plead not guilty and described his prison conditions as "psychologically unbearable." Fahmy was denied bail and had his court case adjourned until 5 March 2014.

On 31 March 2014, he and co-defendants Peter Greste and Baher Mohammed made a request to a judge during a hearing to be released.

Fahmy received the Canadian Commission World Press Freedom Award and a certificate from UNESCO on World Press Freedom Day dated May 3, 2014, which coincided with his appearance in court. He was allowed out of the cage to explain the nature of journalism to the judge. He reminded judge Nagy Shehata that; "the world is watching" and asked for bail. His request was overruled after the judge wished him and his colleagues a "Happy Press Freedom Day".

Fahmy addressed the court in an emotional plea on June 16 and once again denied the charges and said, " I wish there was a single shred of evidence so I could defend myself. And, even if there was, you would have to prove ill-intent".

On June 23, 2014, the Cairo Criminal Court convicted the three journalists. International news organisations called the trial a farce. US Secretary of State John Kerry was highly critical of the sentences of Fahmy and his co-workers, terming them "chilling and draconian" and noted he had spoken to Egyptian governmental officials including President Abdul Fattah al-Sisi. The Egyptian president, who later said that he wished the journalists had simply been deported, the following day announced that he would not interfere with the judiciary. President al-Sisi said in a speech at the Military Academy graduation ceremony that he called Minister of Justice Mahfouz Saber and told him,

We will not intervene in the affairs of the judiciary because it is independent. If we earnestly seek a state of institutions, we must respect judicial rulings.

On 23 July 2014, the judge in the case released his reasoning for the sentence, saying the Al-Jazeera journalists were brought together "by the devil" to destabilize Egypt.

Telecommunication mogul and billionaire Naguib Sawiris alleged that Fahmy has no affiliation with the Muslim Brotherhood. Sawiris even took his fury further and released a video calling on president Abdel Fattah al-Sisi to release Fahmy.

His lawyer Amal Clooney hired on his own capacity and not through Aljazeera Media Network called the judicial process a "show-trial" in her 18 August 2014 op-ed for the Huffington Post. She released several statements, including one on 24 November 2014 calling on the Egyptians to release her client, and urged the Qatari government and Al Jazeera to take positive steps to support his freedom and refrain from actions that hinder his cause.

On January 1, 2014, the highest court in Egypt upheld the sentence.

On 1 February, Fahmy's colleague Peter Greste was deported to Australia. The Egyptian law allowing the deportation of foreigners stipulates that they face prison or trial in their home country, but Australia is not likely to uphold Greste's conviction, no explanation was given for his release. However, Fahmy was released on bail after spending 411 days of incarceration. He was banned from leaving Egypt, as his retrial continued in the Cairo Criminal Court, and faced the possibility of returning to prison at the end of the retrial.

=== Retrial ===
The trio stood trial on 1 January 2015, before the Egyptian High Appellate court. The court ordered a retrial for Fahmy and his two colleagues, while keeping them in custody. On 2 February 2015, it was reported that he would renounce his Egyptian Citizenship so he could fit the Foreign-Pardon law and be deported to his Canada, where he is a citizen. He renounced his Egyptian citizenship on 3 February 2015. On 12 February 2015 Fahmy was released on bail of 250,000 Egyptian Pounds. Baher Mohamed was also released. The presiding judge adjourned proceedings until 23 February.

On 29 August 2015, the Egyptian court sentenced Fahmy and Mohammad to three years in prison. They were found guilty of not registering with the country's Ministry of Culture, using central Cairo's Marriott hotel as a broadcasting point without permission, bringing into Egypt equipment without security officials' approval, and spreading false news. His legal team included Amal Clooney, who was able to secure on 30 August an interview with CBC Television's The National reporter in Egypt, Derek Stoffel, in which she called for Stephen Harper to intervene on behalf of Fahmy, saying

This is the most high-profile case of a Canadian abroad being imprisoned on sham charges. It's a dangerous precedent being set. It's a journalist who's going to prison for no reason... What needs to happen now, in my view, is very high-level engagement by the government of Canada and that means Prime Minister Harper engaging directly with President Sisi. If I were a Canadian citizen, I would want to see my prime minister now showing leadership on the global stage.

The ambassador in Egypt for the UK, John Casson, was disciplined by the Egyptian foreign ministry over his "unacceptable interference" in the affair, made in Arabic outside the court, on Facebook and on Twitter. The interference was deemed "incompatible with diplomatic norms and practices", and a spokesman "rejects any foreign criticism of judicial verdicts." Casson said the court's decision would "undermine confidence in Egypt's stability" although it was not immediately apparent why this should be the case. In the original trial, two al-Jazeera journalists from Britain, Sue Turton and Dominic Kane, had been tried and found guilty in absentia. Amal Clooney orchestrated another television interview for the benefit of British viewers. Clooney was to appear with the Canadian ambassador to Egypt, Troy Lulashnyk, to pressure Egyptian officials for a presidential pardon.

In the context of the 2015 Federal election in Canada, Justin Trudeau, the leader of the Liberal Party of Canada and Tom Mulcair, the leader of the New Democratic Party of Canada both tweeted their support of Fahmy and attacked Harper. Each of the opposition foreign affairs critics called for firm action: NDP Foreign Affairs Critic Paul Dewar said,

Very concretely, we are asking Stephen Harper to put aside the election campaign for a moment and call President al-Sisi directly and ask him to send Mr. Fahmy home.

while Liberal Foreign Affairs Critic Marc Garneau stated that Harper should contact el-Sissi and

...register Canada's strongest disapproval, and in fact to make it very clear that the relationship between Canada and Egypt, which has been a good one, is in jeopardy if Mr. Fahmy has to go back to jail.

=== Pardon ===
A presidential spokesman for Sisi announced on 23 September 2015 that Fahmy and Baher Mohamed had been pardoned and were slated for release. Sisi issued the pardons ahead of the Eid al-Adha holiday and festival.

== See also ==
- Al Jazeera controversies and criticism
