= Mahmoud Hussein =

Egyptian journalist

- Born: 12 December 1966 (age 59); Zawiyat Abo Musallam, Giza Governorate, Egypt
- Education: Cairo University
- Occupation: Journalist
- Years active: 1989–2016
- Known for: Al Jazeera

Mahmoud Hussein (born 12 December 1966) is an Egyptian former journalist who worked for Al Jazeera. He was held in an Egyptian prison for four years without being charged or going through trial until his release on 6 February 2021. His incarceration was in violation of Egyptian law and was condemned by international rights groups, media freedom organisations and the United Nations.

== Early life ==
Hussein was born on 12 December 1966 in the Giza Governorate village of Zawiyat Abo Musallam. While growing up, he would regularly listen to local farmers who debated amongst each other while his father was an avid radio listener on political affairs. Hussein credited those two influences as being preparations for his career as a journalist.

Hussein was the first in his family to attend school and graduated from high school in 1984. He attended Cairo University and graduated with a degree in economics and political science in 1988. Hussein achieved a master's degree in international law from Ain Shams University in 1989 and a second bachelor's degree in law in 1994. He also studied history for three years but did not complete his studies due to his employment with Nile TV.

== Career ==
Hussein's career in journalism began when a friend of his read a research paper he had written and showed it to the head of national affairs Voice of the Arabs radio station. Hussein was subsequently offered a job as a politics editor in 1989.

Hussein joined Nile TV in 1996. He worked as a political affairs correspondent before a promotion to head of correspondents. Hussein was stationed in Palestine for parts of his Nile TV tenure; he interviewed Yasser Arafat in 2000 and covered the Israeli disengagement from the Gaza Strip.

Hussein then worked as a freelance reporter for channels including Al-Alam News Network and Al Arabiya. He held the position of Sudanese bureau chief for Sudan TV in Cairo. Hussein taught news production and editing at the Radio and Television Institute in Cairo.

Hussein joined Al Jazeera's Cairo bureau as a correspondent in 2010; he had worked as a freelance correspondent for Al Jazeera since 2003. With Al Jazeera, he covered the 2011 Egyptian revolution and the Port Said Stadium riot. When the Egyptian authorities closed Al Jazeera's Cairo office in 2013, Hussein moved to their headquarters in Doha to work as a news producer.

== Arrest and imprisonment ==
On 20 December 2016, Hussein was arrested shortly after his arrival in Egypt while on a visit to see his family. He was questioned for 14 hours without a lawyer present and then released. Hussein was arrested for a second time on 23 December 2016 but it was not announced by Egyptian authorities until two days later. Hussein was accused of "incitement against state institutions and broadcasting false news with the aim of spreading chaos"; the charges were denied by Hussein and the Al Jazeera Media Network (AJMN). Egyptian media circulated information that detailed Hussein as a terrorist and an enemy of the state.

Hussein was held in the maximum-security Tora Prison where he experienced physical and psychological duress. He was kept in solitary confinement for the first three months after his arrest, where he suffered a broken arm and was refused proper medical treatment.

In May 2019, an Egyptian court rejected an order by the state prosecutor to release Hussein. Authorities returned Hussein to prison and opened a new investigation into him with unspecified charges. Hussein requested to visit his critically ill father in hospital before the latter's death in November 2019 but was rejected by the prison warden.

The Egyptian penal code sets a maximum pre-trial detention period of 620 days for individuals who are investigated for a felony; Hussein reached 1,000 days of illegal detention in September 2019. His detention was extended by Egyptian authorities more than a dozen times. Hussein shared a cell with three other inmates. He was allowed to have visitors once a week where his family observed his substantial weight loss and developed concerns for his health.

=== Calls for release ===
The Al Jazeera Media Network (AJMN) consistently denied the charges placed against Hussein and called for his release. Mostefa Souag, the Acting Director General of AJMN, has called Hussein's case as "baseless accusations and trumped-up charges." On the 1,000th day of his illegal detention, Al Jazeera launched a campaign website at FreeMahmoudHussein.com.

On 3 February 2018, the Office of the United Nations High Commissioner for Human Rights (OHCHR) deemed the detention of Hussein as "arbitrary" and demanded his immediate release. The OHCHR report concluded there was "no legal basis in Egyptian law" for Hussein's continued pre-trial detention and drew attention to Egyptian authorities' failure to produce justifiable evidence.

The International Press Institute and Amman Center for Human Rights Studies called for Hussein's release. His case has been detailed by the Tom Lantos Human Rights Commission.

On 6 February 2021, Hussein was released from prison. Mostefa Souag, the acting director-general of the AJMN, called the release "a moment of truth and an inspiring milestone towards press freedom."

== Personal life ==
Hussein is married. He has nine children.

== See also ==
- 2013–15 detention of Al Jazeera journalists by Egypt
