= Human rights violations during the Libyan civil war (2011) =

The outbreak of the Libyan civil war was followed by accusations of human rights violations by rebel forces opposed to Muammar Gaddafi, Gaddafi's armed forces, and NATO. The alleged violations include rape, extrajudicial killings, ethnic cleansing, misconduct and bombings of civilians.

== Libyan Armed Forces ==
=== Claims of systematic shooting at protesters ===
Luis Moreno Ocampo, chief prosecutor of the International Criminal Court, estimated that between 500 and 700 people were killed by Gaddafi's security forces in February 2011, before the rebels even took up arms. "Shooting at protesters was systematic," Moreno-Ocampo stated, discussing the Libyan government's response to the initial anti-government demonstrations.

The Libyan government denied that they ordered killings of demonstrators in the early days of the uprising. They said that soldiers acted in self-defense as they were attacked by mobs.

Moreno-Ocampo further stated that during the conflict, "War crimes are apparently committed as a matter of policy" by forces loyal to Gaddafi. This is further supported by claims of Human Rights Watch, that 10 protesters, who had already agreed to lay down arms, were executed by a government paramilitary group in Bani Walid in May.

In June 2011, an investigation carried out by Amnesty International claimed that allegations of use of anti-aircraft guns against crowds lack evidence, noting that rebels at times appeared to have made false claims or manufactured evidence. The used cartridges after protesters were shot at "came from Kalashnikovs or similar calibre weapons". According to the Amnesty investigation, "there is no proof of mass killing of civilians on the scale of Syria or Yemen", adding that in Bengazi 100 to 110 people were killed, and in Baida 59 to 64 people were killed. Most of these were probably protesters, and some might have had weapons.

However, in a later report from Amnesty International it was found that "al-Gaddafi forces committed serious violations of international humanitarian law (IHL), including war crimes, and gross human rights violations, which point to the commission of crimes against humanity. They deliberately killed and injured scores of unarmed protesters; subjected perceived opponents and critics to enforced disappearance and torture and other ill- treatment and arbitrarily detained scores of civilians. They launched indiscriminate attacks and attacks targeting civilians in their efforts to regain control of Misratah and territory in the east. They launched artillery, mortar and rocket attacks against residential areas. They used inherently indiscriminate weapons such as anti-personnel land mines and cluster bombs, including in residential areas."

In July 2011, Saif al-Islam Gaddafi had an interview with Russia Today, where he denied the ICC's allegations that he or his father ordered the killing of civilian protesters. He contended that as he was not a member of the government or the military, therefore he lacked the authority to give such orders. According to Saif, he made recorded calls to General Abdul Fatah Younis (who later defected to the rebel forces) to request that force not be used against protesters, to which Younis responded that they were attacking a military site, where surprised guards fired in self-defense.

=== Allegations of mass rape ===
A Libyan psychologist, Seham Sergiwa, conducted a survey of refugees in Tunisia and Egypt to document the trauma of the civil war. Nearly 300 women were reported to have been raped by Gaddafi's forces. The real number could be much higher, considering the stigma attached to rape victims in Libyan society. Every single woman in the survey who admitted to being raped said they were raped by loyalist soldiers or militiamen.

United Nations war-crimes expert M. Cherif Bassiouni, Human Rights Watch (HRW), Doctors Without Borders and Amnesty International stated that they found no evidence of systematic rape conducted by the Libyan government. Amnesty International's Donatella Rovera said that the Benghazi rebels had knowingly made false claims or manufactured evidence, quoting one example of pristine boxes of Viagra that the rebels said were found inside a totally burned out tank belonging to Gaddafi's troops. This raised serious doubts about the claim that Gaddafi handed out Viagra to his soldiers to enable them to rape more efficiently.

Physicians for Human Rights (PHR) collected testimony of eyewitness who reported that pro-Gaddafi forces transformed an elementary school into a detention site where they raped women and girls as young as 14 years old. PHR also reports of honor killings that occurred in response to these rapes.

=== Use of land mines as a means of war ===
Human Rights Watch has confirmed claims of rebels, that pro-Gaddafi forces used land mines frequently during the conflict. It found them on at least six different locations in Libya, mostly on frontlines of the Gaddafi forces. Among these land mines are not only anti-tank mines, but also anti-personnel mines, which can permanently pose a threat to civilians.

=== Shelling of civilian areas ===
Gaddafi forces have been accused by human-rights groups of shelling towns with heavy weapons, risking civilian lives indiscriminately. The most accusations refer to the siege of Misrata, accusing Gaddafi forces of targeting hospitals and civilian areas, also using internationally outlawed cluster bombs of Spanish production as ammunition, having risked the lives of civilians.

=== Other abuses of non-combatants ===
A Human Rights Watch report documents the "unlawful occupation and terror of hospital staff" by pro-Government forces in Yafran in the western mountains, risking the lives of the patients and terrifying the staff contrary to international law.

In August 2011, Physicians for Human Rights released a report documenting severe violations of human rights and evidence of war crimes and possible crimes against humanity in Misrata. Findings included that Qaddafi forces used civilians as human shields, attacked ambulances bearing the Red Crescent, destroyed religious buildings, and intentionally starved civilians. In the same report, PHR gave evidence to violations of medical neutrality, such as attacks on medical facilities, medical transport, and medical workers.

Documents which obtained by The Guardian's sister newspaper The Observer also revealed that Gaddafi's senior generals had ordered bombarding and forced starvation in the city of Misrata, as well as the killing and rape of many of its people.

== Anti-Gaddafi forces ==
=== Crimes against international humanitarian law ===
==== Execution of prisoners of war ====
A group of 15 to 22 Libyan army soldiers captured in Derna were reportedly executed in the neighboring village of Martuba. 20 kilometres (12 miles) According to a widely circulated story, the men were claimed to have been "executed by their own officers for disobeying orders".

Another group of 15 African mercenaries were publicly executed by hanging in front of the Bayda courthouse.

==== Murder and torture of injured soldiers ====
On 17 February, the Bayda hospital admitted two injured men, one of darker complexion and the other of olive complexion. The men were accused of fighting against the rebels and being mercenaries. A hospital doctor claimed that the black man was murdered and hung by an angry mob that had gathered around the hospital. The other injured man was reportedly beaten, shot and returned to the emergency room.

=== Lootings and beatings ===
In four towns in the western mountains captured in June by the opposition, HRW noticed looting of private property and beatings of alleged Gaddafi sympathizers by rebel forces. The National Transitional Council (NTC) then pledged to hold responsible the causers of the attacks and to prevent such abuses in the future.

=== Killing of civilians ===
During the Battle of Sirte, the rebels were accused of killing civilians, including men, women, and children, while there were also reports of the rebels harassing and stealing from the locals. According to one resident, "The rebels are worse than rats. NATO is the same as Osama bin Laden." According to another local woman, "We lived in democracy under Muammar Gaddafi, he was not a dictator. I lived in freedom, Libyan women had full human rights. It isn't that we need Muammar Gaddafi again, but we want to live just as we did before." A local elderly woman stated "They are killing our children. Why are they doing this? For what? Life was good before!"

== NATO airstrikes ==
On 9 August, the Libyan government claimed that 85 civilians were killed in NATO airstrikes on the village of Majer near Zliten. A NATO spokesman said that they were targeting four buildings in which nine vehicles were destroyed and that government claim "was not corroborated by available factual information at the site". The Libyan government declared three days of national mourning. Reporters were later taken to a hospital where they saw at least 30 dead bodies, including the bodies of at least two young children. The Libyan government claimed that the bodies of others killed in the airstrikes were taken to other hospitals. Neither of these claims were independently verified, although some media outlets came to the conclusion that it seemed more credible than usual that something tragic happened due to the presence of at least 14 bodies at one hospital, including an infant.

== Other ==
=== Allegations of Human rights watch groups falsifying claims ===
Some journalists have accused human-rights organizations of falsifying claims, that Gaddafi was using mercenaries from other parts of Africa to attack protesters, Among the sources pointing to the existence of mercenaries are the claims by Gaddafi's former Chief of Protocol Nouri Al Mismari, who has claimed the presence of mercenaries from countries such as Chad, Niger, and Mali.

==== Murder of guest workers and black Libyans ====
The Chadian government called on coalition forces to protect its citizens in rebel-held areas in Libya. It claimed that dozens had been accused and executed for allegedly being mercenaries in the pay of Gaddafi.

A Turkish oil worker reported witnessing the murder of 70 to 80 Sudanese and Chadian guest workers with pruning shears and axes by Libyans who accused them of being Gaddafi mercenaries.

HRW's Peter Bouckaert visited Bayda where 156 supposed mercenaries were being held captive. He reported that these men were actually black Libyans from Southern Libya. He argued that the support of the black southern Libyans for the Gaddafi regime was explainable, as Gaddafi fought to counter discrimination against them in Libyan society. In the same interview, Bouckaert also said that those 156 individuals were released by the rebels less than two weeks after being captured.

Killings of unarmed migrant workers by insurgents have been described. On 18 April, a British reporter who had just arrived at Benghazi by sea from Misrata described the sufferings of large numbers of migrant workers trapped in Misrata in a broadcast on BBC Radio 4. After mentioning casualties during government forces attack he said about the migrant workers that "…some have also died in clashes with the, err, rebel fighters. They were protesting about the conditions, demanding that they should be repatriated and on a couple of occasions this has led to the rebels opening fire and, err, people dying."

== See also ==
- Atrocity propaganda#Other cases
- Human rights violations during the Gaddafi regime
