= 2013–2015 detention of Al Jazeera journalists by Egypt =

2013–2015 arrest and detention of Al Jazeera English journalists
- Date: December 29, 2013 – September 23, 2015 (1 year, 8 months, 3 weeks and 4 days)
- Location: Cairo Marriott Hotel Cairo, Egypt
- Also known as: "the Marriot cell"; by Egyptian authorities
- Outcome: Presidential Pardon
- Suspects: (Australia) Peter Greste (Egypt) Baher Mohammed (Egypt) (Canada) Mohamed Fahmy
- Charges: reporting false news, connections with the Muslim Brotherhood (later overturned) reporting false news (convicted but later overturned)
- Verdict: Guilty on 2 counts (23 June 2014; later overturned); Guilty on 1 count (29 August 2015; charges cleared on 23 September 2015)
- Awards: (United Kingdom) Royal Television Society award (19 February 2015)
- As of 23 September 2015, Mohamed Fahmy and Baher Mohamed were pardoned by President Abdel Fattah el-Sisi and had their charges overturned while Peter Greste's charges have not yet been overturned since being released and deported to Australia on 1 February 2015.

On December 29, 2013, three journalists who were working for the Qatari-based international news channel Al Jazeera English, Australian Peter Greste, Canadian Mohamed Fahmy and Egyptian Baher Mohamed, were taken into custody by Egyptian security forces at the Marriott Hotel in Cairo following a raid at their room, which was used for the news channel's remote studio. The Egyptian Interior Ministry confirmed the arrest and said the journalists were accused of reporting news which was "damaging to national security".

On June 23, 2014, after a four-month trial, all three were found guilty and were sentenced to between 7 and 10 years of imprisonment, triggering harsh criticism from various governments and human rights organizations. A day later, Egyptian President Abdel Fattah el-Sisi declared that he would not interfere with judicial rulings.

In February 2015, Greste was released from prison and deported back to Australia via Cyprus, while the other two journalists were released on bail, pending a new trial. After the retrial, the reporters were again found guilty and sentenced to between 3 and 3.5 years of imprisonment. A month later, they were released from prison following a presidential pardon issued by President Abdel Fattah el-Sisi.

== 2013 arrest ==
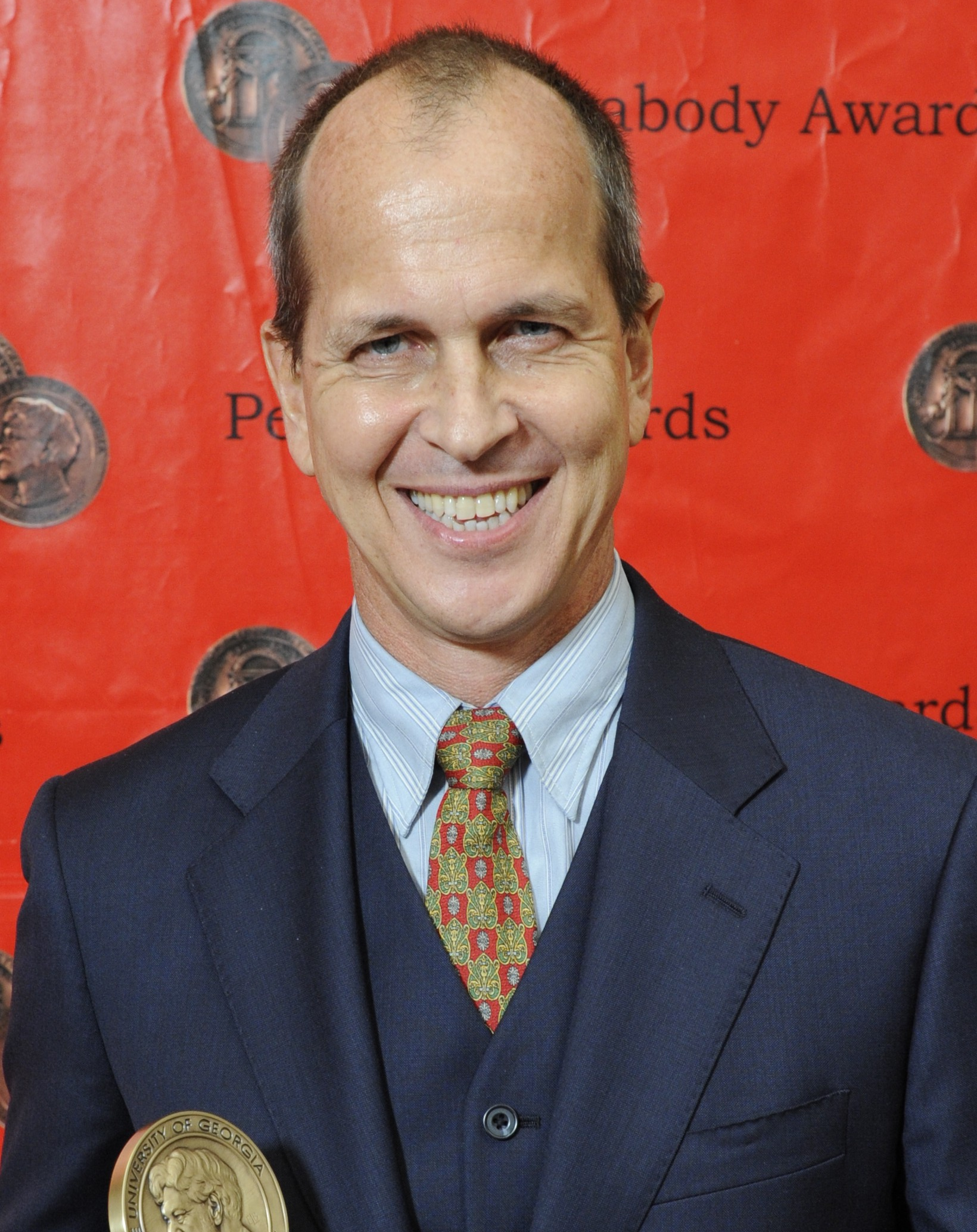
Peter Greste in 2012

Australian journalist Peter Greste and his colleagues Mohamed Fahmy and Baher Mohamed were arrested on 29 December 2013 at the Cairo Marriott Hotel after the police conducted a raid at their room, which was used as their makeshift news studio. The Egyptian Interior Ministry confirmed the arrest and said the journalists were accused of reporting false news which was "damaging to national security".

Following their arrest, Greste and his colleagues were imprisoned in Egypt in solitary confinement for a month before any formal charges were made.

On 29 January 2014, it emerged that the Egyptian authorities were to charge 20 journalists belonging to Al Jazeera, including Greste, of falsifying news and having a negative impact on overseas perceptions of the country.

On the same day, all three were charged with:

- Being members of a terrorist organisation, as the Egyptian government has designated the Muslim Brotherhood on December 25, 2013
- Aiding and funding the group
- Broadcasting false news and reports of civil strife in Egypt
- Operating without licenses

The three men were being held in the same cell in early February 2014. The United Nations High Commissioner for Human Rights urged the authorities in Egypt to "promptly release" the Al Jazeera staff.

== 2014 trial and sentencing ==
On 21 February 2014, Greste was denied bail and had his court case adjourned until 5 March 2014.

On 31 March 2014, he and co-defendants Mohammed Fahmy and Baher Mohamed made a request to a judge during a hearing to be released. During the hearing Greste told the judge: "The idea that I could have an association with the Muslim Brotherhood is frankly preposterous."

On paper, Fahmy has been described as the "ring-leader" of the "terrorist cell". Hundreds of so-called fabricated videos considered as evidence confiscated from the Al Jazeera English hard-disk were listed against him personally. Most of these allegedly fabricated videos were filmed in the past three years before Fahmy worked for Al Jazeera when he was still reporting for CNN in Cairo. The investigation states that he prepared a "media center" in the hotel where he held meetings with Muslim Brotherhood leaders and recruited students to gather news. But Fahmy testified in court that he was personally a liberal who marched as a private citizen in protests to support President Abdel Fattah al-Sisi against the Muslim Brotherhood. Prominent Egyptian figures like Amr Moussa, the former head of the Arab League, and telecommunication mogul and billionaire Naguib Sawiris attested to Fahmy's integrity in court and confirmed he has no affiliation with the Muslim Brotherhood.

Egyptian scientist Farouk El-Baz who worked on the United States space program also supported Fahmy in a letter submitted to the judge. Mr. Sawiris even took his fury further and released a video calling on Egyptian President Abdel Fattah al-Sisi to release Fahmy.

Mohamed Fahmy's international lawyer Amal Clooney, hired in his own capacity and not through Al Jazeera Media Network, called the judicial process a "show-trial" in her Huffington Post Article "The Anatomy of an Unfair Trial". She released several statements calling on the Egyptians to release her client and urged the Qatari government and Al Jazeera to take positive steps to support his freedom and refrain from actions that hinder his cause.

On 23 June 2014, all three were found guilty of the charges against them. Greste and Fahmy were sentenced to seven years imprisonment. Mohamed received a sentence of seven years imprisonment plus an additional three years for bullet possession which he picked up during a demonstration. International reactions were swift and negative. US Secretary of State John Kerry was highly critical of the sentences of Greste and his co-workers, terming them "chilling and draconian" and noted that he had spoken to Egyptian governmental officials including President Abdul Fattah al-Sisi. Al-Sisi however was unmoved. A day after the trial and amidst the widespread international condemnation, the Egyptian president declared that he would not interfere with judicial rulings.

Greste and his colleagues were seen internationally as political prisoners due to the nature of the trial, the lack of applicable evidence presented and the sentences.

Eleven defendants tried in absentia, including three foreign journalists, received 10-year sentences.

=== International reactions to the 2014 verdict ===
==== Non-governmental organisations ====
- Human Rights Watch called the trial a "miscarriage of justice based on zero evidence".
- PEN American Center criticized the ruling and stated: "The conviction, drawing on a trial devoid of any credible evidence against the accused, demonstrates a blatant disregard for the universally guaranteed right to free expression."

==== By country ====
- Australia: Australian Foreign Minister, Julie Bishop said that she was "bitterly disappointed" by the outcome.
- United Kingdom: British Prime Minister David Cameron said he was "completely appalled" and the UK Foreign Office has summoned the Egyptian ambassador in London over the guilty verdicts. Two of the journalists convicted in absentia are also British.
- United States: Secretary of State John Kerry was highly critical of the sentences of Greste and his co-workers, terming them "chilling and draconian" and noted he had spoken to Egyptian governmental officials including President Abdul Fattah al-Sisi.

== 2015 re-trial and sentencing ==
The trio stood trial on January 1, 2015, before the Cairo Court Of Cassation. The court ordered a retrial for Fahmy and his two colleagues, while keeping them in custody as their request to release on bail was denied.

On 29 August 2015 - after a 9-month-long trial, Fahmy was sentenced to three years in prison, Mohamed was sentenced to 3 1/2 years in prison and fined £E5,000 ($640), and Greste was sentenced in absentia to three years in prison at a sentencing hearing in Cairo. Following the verdict, Judge Hassan Farid said the accused broadcast "false news ... with the aim of harming the country".

From his home country of Australia, Greste said he would be unable to travel to Egypt or any country with an extradition treaty with Egypt if an international arrest warrant for him was issued. Furthermore, Greste said in a tweet that he was "shocked" and "outraged" about the verdict.

=== International reactions to the 2015 verdict ===
==== Non-governmental organisations ====
- Amnesty International called the verdict "farcical" and urged the Egyptian judiciary to overturn it.

==== By country ====
- Australia: Australian Foreign Minister, Julie Bishop said that she was "dismayed by the decision" and adding that she "will continue to pursue all diplomatic avenues" to overturn the sentence.

- Leader of the Opposition, Bill Shorten condemned the verdict and added that he stands in solidarity with imprisoned journalists in Egypt and rest of the world.

- Canada: The Canadian government condemned the verdict as "disappointing". Canadian Prime Minister Stephen Harper tweeted that Canada continues to call on Egypt for the immediate and full release of Mr. Fahmy, and full co-operation to facilitate his return home. Leader of the Opposition, Thomas Mulcair condemned the verdict and has called for Prime Minister Harper to seek a guarantee from Egyptian President al-Sisi that Mohamed Fahmy will be pardoned & returned to Canada

=== Release ===
On February 1, 2015, Greste was deported to Australia via Cyprus. The presidential decree that allows the deportation of foreigners stipulates that they face prison or trial in their home country, but Australia is unlikely to uphold Greste's conviction. Otherwise, no explanation was given for his release. Two days later, Fahmy renounced his Egyptian citizenship so he could be deported to Canada. His request was still pending at the time of the sentencing in August.

On February 12, Fahmy and Mohamed were released on bail of £E250,000 ($33,000) with strict conditions. After the judge handed down sentences in August, they were taken back into custody. Fahmy's lawyer, Amal Clooney, said she would meet with Egyptian government officials to ask for her client to be deported to Canada.

On September 23, 2015, Fahmy and Mohamed were released from prison after Egyptian president Abdel Fattah el-Sisi issued a pardon on 100 activists including the Al Jazeera journalists, which was announced on his Facebook page. This marks the occasion of Eid al-Adha and the President's visit to the 70th session of the United Nations General Assembly which will take place later this week. The Al Jazeera Media Network has welcomed their release but continues to demand all charges and sentences against its journalists are dropped.

After release Fahmy traveled back to Canada, where he took a role as a journalist in residence at the University of British Columbia in Vancouver, British Columbia.

== Honours ==
On February 19, 2015, the three detained reporters won a special Royal Television Society award for their sacrifices to journalism. Greste accepted the award in London for the three.

== Lawsuit against Al Jazeera ==
On May 5, 2015, Mohamed Fahmy filed a lawsuit against Al Jazeera for C$100 million (US$75.3 million) in punitive and remedial damages for alleged negligence and breach of contract. He accused the network of "negligence" by misinforming him about its legal status and their safety in Egypt.

== See also ==
- Al Jazeera controversies and criticism
- Mahmoud Hussein
- Jason Rezaian
