= Religious views on female genital mutilation =

- Worldwide prevalence of female genital mutilation (2016)
- Origin: Northeast Africa, possibly Meroë (current Sudan), c. 800 BCE – c. 350 CE
- Earliest reference: 163 BCE
- Concentration: Africa, Middle East, Indonesia, Malaysia
- Religions: Shafi and Dawoodi Bohra, but also some Animist and Christian groups
- Required by any religion: Shafi'i school of thought of Sunni Islam and Shia Dawoodi Bohras who require the partial cutting of the prepuce or a small nick on the prepuce.
- Definition: "Female genital mutilation comprises all procedures involving partial or total removal of the external female genitalia or other injury to the female genital organs for non-medical reasons" (WHO, UNICEF, UNFPA, 1997).

There is a widespread view among practitioners of female genital mutilation (FGM) that it is a religious requirement, although prevalence rates often vary according to geography and ethnic group. There is an ongoing debate about the extent to which the practice's continuation is influenced by custom, social pressure, lack of health-care information, and the position of women in society. (Note: Gerry Mackie and John LeJeune (2008): "An ethnic or religious explanation of FGM/C [female genital mutilation/circumcision] is not sufficient since, first, it is practiced in a wide variety of ethnic and religious groups; and second, the practice is not necessarily universal within the broad descriptive group, but is often practiced only within a number of subgroups. Take religion: there are Muslim communities who practice FGM/C, often believing that the practice is required by the holy book. Yet, nearby communities of the same religion may not engage in FGM/C, and worldwide most Muslims do not follow the practice. Religious obligation is an important factor in the decision to practice FGM/C, but is typically just one of several elements within what one WHO report (1999) calls a mental map that incorporates the stories, beliefs, values, and codes of conduct of society, and which are in fact 'interconnected and mutually reinforcing and, taken together, form overwhelming unconscious and conscious motivations' for its continuation.") The procedures confer no health benefits and can lead to serious health problems.

FGM is practised predominantly within certain Muslim societies, but it also exists within some adjacent Christian and animist groups. The practice is not required by Islam and fatwas have been issued forbidding FGM, favouring it, or leaving the decision to parents but advising against it. However, FGM was introduced in Southeast Asia by the spread of Shafi'i version of Islamic jurisprudence, which considers the practice obligatory. There is mention of it on a Greek papyrus from 163 BCE and a possible indirect reference to it on a coffin from Egypt's Middle Kingdom (c. 1991–1786 BCE). It has been found among Skoptsy Christians in Europe, Coptic Christians in Egypt, Orthodox Christians in Ethiopia, Protestants and Catholics in Sudan and Kenya. The only Jewish group known to have practiced it are the Beta Israel of Ethiopia. (Note: Shaye J. D. Cohen (2005): Aside from the Beta Israel of Ethiopia (the so-called Falashas) ... no Jewish community, in either ancient, medieval, or modern times, is known to have practiced female circumcision.")

== Background ==
=== Definition ===
Until the 1980s FGM was widely known as female circumcision, which gave the erroneous impression that it was equivalent in severity and health effects to male circumcision. In fact, FGM has only adverse health effects and is almost always more extensive than male circumcision. In 1990 the IAC began referring to it as female genital mutilation, as did the World Health Organization (WHO) in 1991. The WHO, UNICEF and UNFPA defined FGM in 1997 as "all procedures involving partial or total removal of the external female genitalia or other injury to the female genital organs for non-medical reasons". There are four WHO categories:

- Type I: "partial or total removal of the clitoral glans (the external and visible part of the clitoris, a highly sensitive part of the female genitals), and/or the prepuce/clitoral hood (the fold of skin surrounding the clitoral glans.)" Type Ia involves removal of just the prepuce. More common is Type Ib (clitoridectomy), the complete or partial removal of the clitoral glans (the visible tip of the clitoris) and clitoral hood.
- Type II (excision): complete or partial removal of the inner labia, with or without removal of the clitoral glans and outer labia.
- Type III (infibulation): removal of the inner and outer labia and the fusion of the wound, leaving a matchstick-sized hole for the passing of urine and menstrual blood.
- Type IV: all other practices including both more severe forms and symbolic nicking.

=== Origins ===
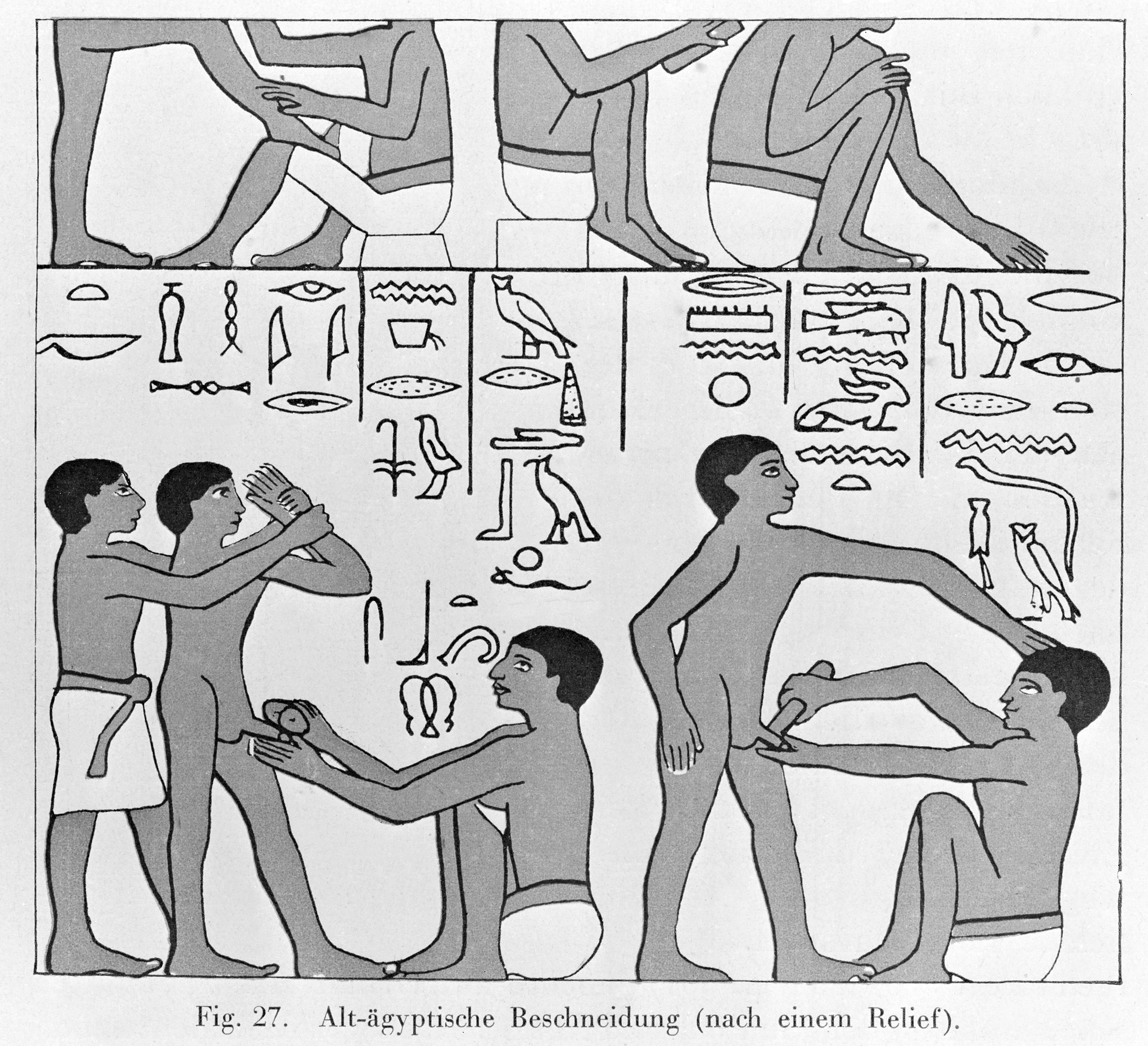
Figures showing a male circumcision scene, based on a wall carving found in Sakkara, Egypt

FGM is concentrated in what Gerry Mackie called an "intriguingly contiguous" zone in Africa—east to west from Somalia to Senegal, and north to south from Egypt to Tanzania. The practice is both "contiguously distributed and contagious", he writes: "It spreads across groups as more resource-endowed males encounter less resource-endowed females in circumstances of inequality." Marriageability is its "main engine of continuation". The practice's distribution in Africa meets in Nubia in the Sudan, leading Mackie to suggest that Type III FGM began there with the Meroite civilization (c. 800 BCE – c. 350 CE) to increase confidence in paternity.

The proposed circumcision of an Egyptian girl is mentioned on a Greek papyrus from 163 BCE. Spell 1117 of the Ancient Egyptian Coffin Texts may refer to an uncircumcised girl ('m't), although there is disagreement about the word's meaning. Found on the sarcophagus of Sit-Hedj-Hotep, the spell dates to Egypt's Middle Kingdom (c. 1991–1786 BCE). The examination of mummies has shown no evidence of FGM.

Strabo (c. 64 BCE – c. 23 CE) wrote about FGM after visiting Egypt around 25 BCE, as did Philo of Alexandria (c. 20 BCE – 50 CE): "the Egyptians by the custom of their country circumcise the marriageable youth and maid in the fourteenth (year) of their age, when the male begins to get seed, and the female to have a menstrual flow." Type III FGM became linked to slavery. João dos Santos wrote in 1609 of a group near Mogadishu who had a "custome to sew up their Females, especially their slaves being young to make them unable for conception, which makes these slaves sell dearer, both for their chastitie, and for better confidence which their Masters put in them".

== Christianity ==
The Bible does not mention FGM. (Note: Samuel Waje Kunhiyop (2008): "Nowhere in all of Scripture or in any of recorded church history is there even a hint that women were to be circumcised.") Christian authorities agree that the practice has no foundation in Christianity's religious texts, and Christian missionaries in Africa were at the forefront of efforts to stop it. Indeed, they led the way in referring to it as mutilation; from 1929 the Kenya Missionary Council called it the "sexual mutilation of women", following the lead of Marion Scott Stevenson, a Church of Scotland missionary. When, in the 1930s, Christian missionaries tried to make the abandonment of FGM a condition of church membership in colonial Kenya, they provoked a far-reaching campaign in defense of the practice.

Despite the absence of scriptural support, women and girls within select few Christian communities, including in Egypt, Kenya, Nigeria and Tanzania, do undergo FGM. It has been found among Coptic Christians in Egypt, Orthodox Christians in Ethiopia, and Protestants and Catholics in Sudan and Kenya. A 2013 UNICEF report identified 17 African countries in which at least 10 percent of Christian women and girls aged 15–49 had undergone it. In Niger, for example, 55 percent of Christian women and girls had experienced it, against two percent of Muslim women and girls.

The Skoptsy Christian sect in Europe practiced FGM as part of redemption from sin and to remain chaste.

== Islam ==
=== Overview ===
Circumcision has been called one of the "five practices" connected to the Fitrah (innate nature in Islam). FGM is found largely within and adjacent to Muslim communities. Prevalence rates among various Muslim nations depend on the ethnicity and location. In Arabic, the practice is referred to as khafḍ (Arabic: خفض) or khifaḍ (Arabic: خِفَض). Khitan (Arabic: خِتان), which means male circumcision, can also include FGM. Less severe forms of FGM, or what the World Health Organization calls Type I (removal of the clitoral hood and/or the clitoral glans), may be referred to as sunna (recommended).

Senior Muslim religious authorities have stated that FGM is neither required nor prohibited by Islam. The Quran does not mention FGM or male circumcision. FGM is praised in a few hadith (sayings attributed to Muhammad) as noble but not required, though the authenticity of these hadith has been questioned.

==== Hadith ====
Islamic hadith collectors Ahmad ibn Hanbal (780–855) and the Hanbali jurisprudent Abū Dāwūd (817–889) reported that Muhammad said circumcision was a "law for men and a preservation of honor for women" however these narrations or Hadith are regarded as daʻīf (weak). In a reported narration Muhammad made female genital cutting optional, but he warned against harming women. The above narration is designated as "weak"; according to the Islamic criteria of authenticity, it is missing a link in the chain of narrators and it is found in only one of the six undisputed hadith collections. According to Sayyid Sabiq, the author of Fiqh-us-Sunnah, all hadiths concerning female circumcision are non-authentic.

One hadith from the Sunan Abu Dawood collection states: "A woman used to perform circumcision in Medina. The Prophet said to her: Do not cut severely as that is better for a woman and more desirable for a husband." Ibn Hajar al-Asqalani describes this hadith as poor in authenticity, and quotes Ahmad Bayhaqi's opinion that it is "poor, with a broken chain of transmission". Yusuf ibn Abd-al-Barr commented: "Those who consider (female) circumcision a sunna, use as evidence this hadith of Abu al-Malih, which is based solely on the evidence of Hajjaj ibn Artaa, who cannot be admitted as an authority when he is the sole transmitter."

Another hadith used in support is in Sahih Muslim: "The Messenger of Allah said: When anyone sits amidst four parts (of the woman) and the circumcised parts touch each other a bath becomes obligatory." Mohammad Salim al-Awa states that, while the hadith is authentic, it is not evidence of support for FGM. He explains that because Arabic uses dualistic semantics, the word for "the two circumcised organs" can mean "the two organs," with only one being circumcised. A hadith in Sahih Bukhari says: "I heard the Prophet saying. "Five practices are characteristics of the Fitra: circumcision, shaving the pubic hair, cutting the moustaches short, clipping the nails, and depilating the hair of the armpits." Mohamed Salim Al-Awwa writes that it is unclear whether these requirements were meant for women and girls.

==== Fatwa ====
In addition to Sharia, the Ijtihad have been one of the four sources of Muslim law through the centuries. Ijtihad include fatwas (opinions of Muslim religious scholars), which are often widely distributed and describe behaviour that conforms to religious requirements. Fatwas have been issued favouring FGM, advising against it but leaving the decision to parents, and forbidding FGM.

==== Support for Type Ia mutilation ====
A number of Muslim authors (Kaleem Muhammad, M Ihsan Karaman) have condemned Types 1B, 2 and 3 female circumcision, while defending Islam "from accusations and slanders" that it supports painful, harmful, "barbaric" FGM while promoting Type Ia mutilation. Type Ia or hoodectomy involves removing only the clitoral hood, sometimes known as the prepuce. This they claim is the only Islamically allowed circumcision, and is "harmless" and "beneficial". (Note: Karaman and Kaleem Muhammad differ somewhat in that Muhammad speaks approvingly of hadith that endorse circumcision for women, while Karaman states "the hadiths reporting about the justification of FC [female circumcision] have been determined by the hadith scholars to be weak." Kaleem Muhammad states that "the type of female circumcision which is permitted in Islam entails cutting piece of the thin skin (prepuce)" i.e. hoodectomy, while Karaman states that he "believes that FC should be abandoned" but not hoodetomy.) Some authors base their support for type Ia on its similarity with male circumcision although others use the same justification for dissimilar and more invasive practices.

=== Sunni view ===
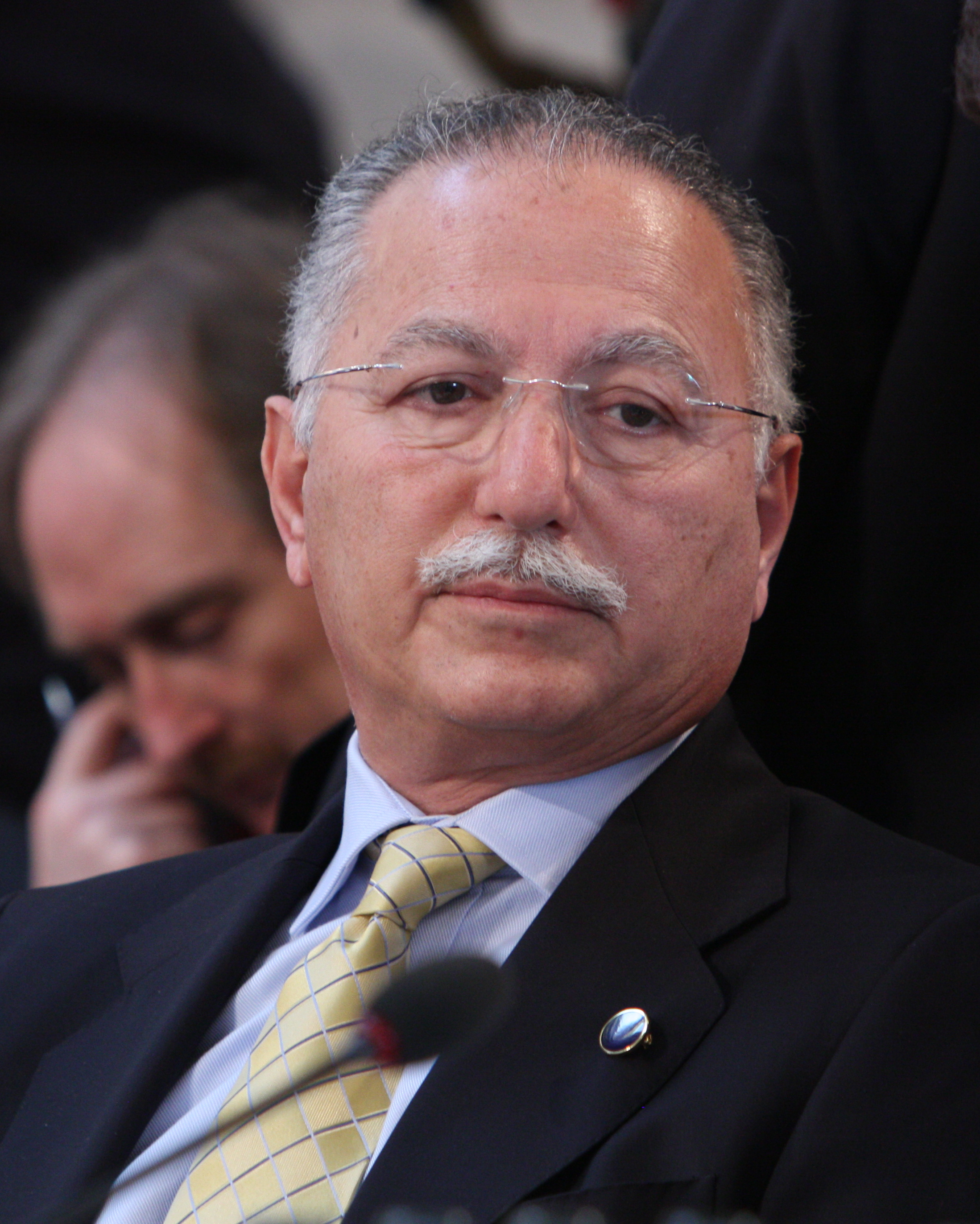
Ekmeleddin İhsanoğlu

Of the four Sunni schools of fiqh, three, the Hanafi, Maliki, and Hanbali schools, consider it recommended (Arabic: مُسْتَحَبّ, romanized: mustahabb) and one, the Shafi'i, consider it mandatory (wājib). The Maliki school considers circumcision recommended but not obligatory for men or women, and the Shafi'i considers it obligatory for both sexes.

Other scholars say it has no justification at all. Egyptian scholars such as Mohammed Emara and Mohammad Salim Al-Awa argue that FGM is not an Islamic practice and is not endorsed by Islamic jurisprudence. Several Muslim leaders have called for an end to the practice. In 2004, after CNN broadcast images of a girl in Cairo undergoing FGM, then Grand Mufti of Egypt Muhammad Sayyid Tantawi declared that hadiths on FGM were unreliable. A conference at Al-Azhar University in Cairo in 2006 saw prominent Muslim clergy declare it unnecessary. After a 12-year-old Egyptian girl died during an FGM procedure in 2007, the Al-Azhar Supreme Council of Islamic Research in Cairo ruled, according to UNICEF, that FGM had "no basis in core Islamic law or any of its partial provisions and that it is harmful and should not be practiced". Ali Gomaa, then Grand Mufti of Egypt, stated: "It's prohibited, prohibited, prohibited." Ekmeleddin İhsanoğlu, Secretary-General of the Organisation of Islamic Cooperation said in 2012 that FGM was "a ritual that has survived over centuries and must be stopped as Islam does not support it".

In May 2012, it was reported that the Muslim Brotherhood in Egypt was working to decriminalize FGM. According to reporter Mariz Tadros, they "offered to circumcise women for a nominal fee as part of their community services, a move that threatens to reverse decades of local struggle against the harmful practice. ... Many of the Brothers (and Salafis) argue that while it is not mandatory, it is nevertheless makrumā (noble, preferable, pleasing in the eyes of God).

==== Southeast Asia ====
External images
- FGM ceremony in Indonesia
- Preparations
- Girl before procedure
- Nine-month-old afterwards — Stephanie Sinclair (The New York Times Magazine, April 2006)

According to William Clarence-Smith, Islamic Southeast Asia "overwhelmingly" follows the Shafi`i school of law, the only one to make FGM obligatory. The greatest opposition in the area, he writes, is from syncretic Muslims in Java; some practitioners use the root of the turmeric plant to perform an alternative symbolic procedure.

Islam introduced FGM into Indonesia and Malaysia from the 13th century on. Over 80 percent of Malaysian women claim religious obligation as the primary reason for practising FGM, along with hygiene (41 percent) and cultural practice (32 percent). The practice is widespread among Muslim women in Indonesia. In 2013 the Indonesian Ulema Council, Indonesia's top Muslim clerical body, ruled that it favours FGM, stating that although it is not mandatory, it is "morally recommended". The Ulema has been pushing the Indonesian government to circumcise girls, arguing that it is part of Islamic teachings. In 2017, future vice president Ma'ruf Amin, then the council's general chair, said that FGM must not be outlawed, saying that it is an Islamic teaching that must be adhered.

In July 2024, Indonesia criminalized all forms of FGM after it repealed exceptions to the laws.

=== Shia view ===
==== Twelvers ====
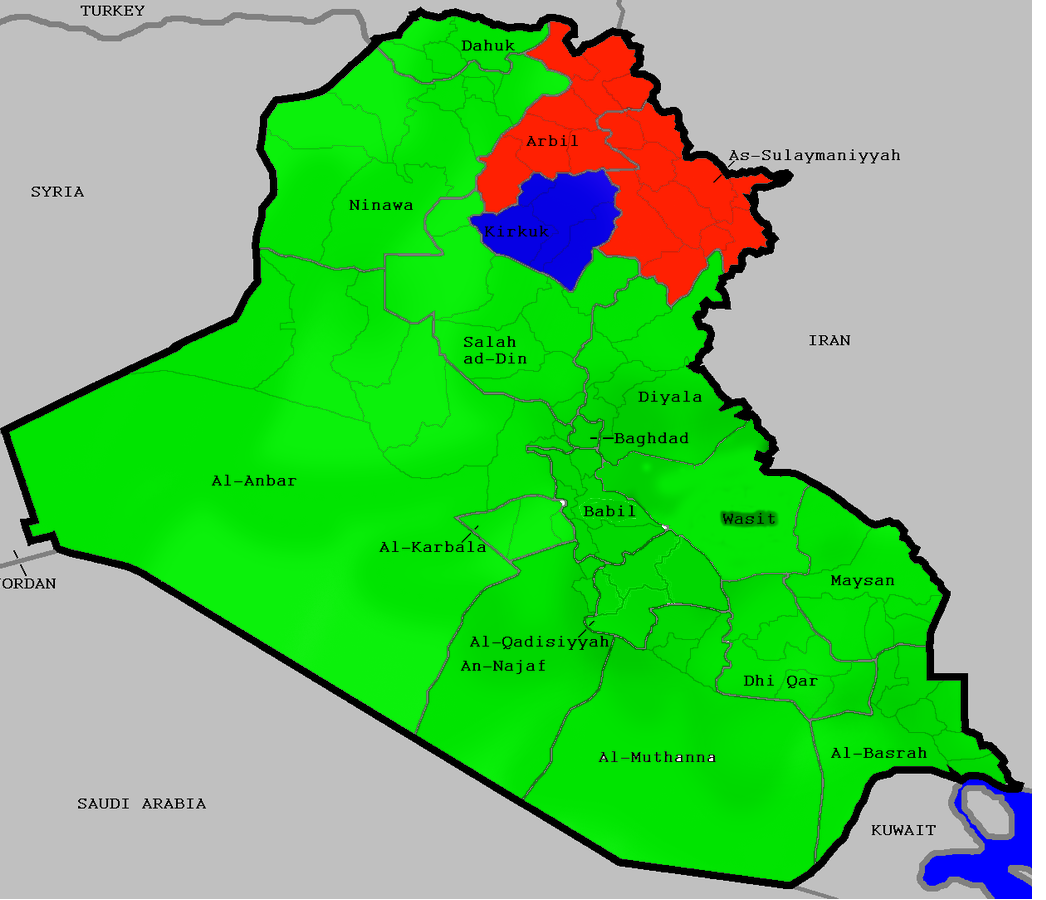
Prevalence of FGM in Iraq for women aged 15–49 using UNICEF "Female Genital Mutilation/Cutting, 2013, from . More recent 2016 survey: . 55–65% 15–25% Less than 3%

Shiite religious texts, such as the hadith transmitted by Al-Sadiq, indicate circumcision is only required for men. Grand Ayatollah Ali al-Sistani, the highest-ranking Shia (Marja’) in Iraq and the leader of the Hawza (Islamic University) of Najaf, forbids FGM on his website:

Question: Is female circumcision obligatory or is tradition and merely recommended?
Answer: If the purpose of female genital circumcision is cutting clitoris this operation is not right and is not a religious tradition. If the girl is hurt, it is prohibited. Female genital (sexual) mutilation or cutting off a part of her genital is certainly a crime against girls and there is no permission and justification for parents to do this operation.

FGM as a practice is nearly universally unknown among the orthodox Shia Muslims. In Iraq and Iran, it is carried out only among the Sunni minorities.

==== Ismailis ====
FGM is performed within the Dawoodi Bohra community in India, Pakistan, Yemen and East Africa. According to a 2015–2016 survey, over 80 percent of 365 Dawoodi Bohra women surveyed wanted the practice to end. In 2017 two doctors and a third woman connected to the Dawoodi Bohra in Detroit, Michigan, were arrested on charges of conducting FGM on two seven-year-old girls in the United States.

In Pakistan and India female genital mutilation is practiced by Muslims of the Dawoodi Bohra and Sheedi communities, who believe that it leads to purity.

== Judaism ==
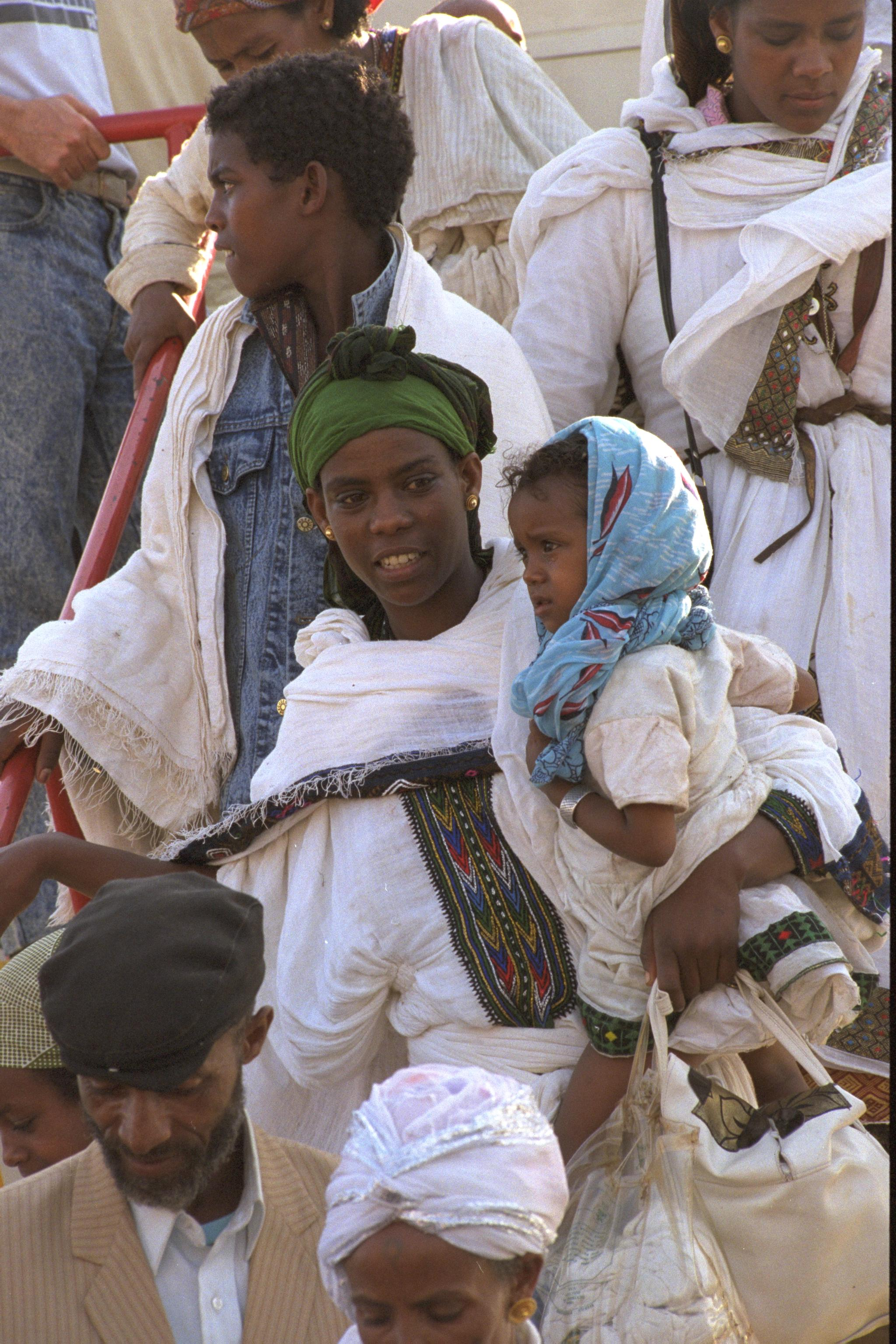
Ethiopian Jews arriving in Israel, 1991

Most forms of Judaism require male circumcision, but they do not allow FGM and the Hebrew Bible (Old Testament) does not mention it.

The only Jewish group known to have practised FGM is the Beta Israel of Ethiopia. The Beta Israel were not familiar with the Talmud, the Mishnah, and other rabbinical literature, and read and spoke little or no Hebrew. A majority of the community was flown to Israel between 1984 and 1991 in the covert Operation Moses and Operation Solomon, and upon arrival in Israel they immediately abandoned FGM. A study in 1997 found that one third of the 113 Beta Israel women examined in Israel had experienced any form of FGM; 27 percent had undergone partial or total clitoridectomy.

== Other religions ==
Several animist groups in Africa, particularly Guinea and Mali, practise it.

== See also ==
- Misogyny
- Religion and male circumcision
- Genital modification and mutilation
- Wartime sexual violence
