= Dhimmi =

Non-Muslims living in an Islamic state

Dhimmī (Arabic: ذمي ḏimmī, "protected person", IPA: [ˈðimmiː], collectively أهل الذمة ʾahl aḏ-ḏimmah/dhimmah, "protected people") is a historical term for non-Muslims living in an Islamic state with certain legal protections and restrictions. The word literally means "protected person", referring to the state's obligation under sharia to protect the individual's life, property, as well as freedom of religion, in exchange for loyalty to the state and payment of the jizya tax, in contrast to the zakat, or obligatory alms, paid by the Muslim subjects. Dhimmi were forbidden to bear arms and so did not perform military service and other privileges assigned specifically to Muslims. They were required to pay the poll tax (jizya) but had certain rights under the laws of property, contract, and obligation.

Dhimmis were subject to specific restrictions as well, which were codified in agreements like the Pact of Umar. These included prohibitions on building new places of worship, repairing existing ones in areas where Muslims lived, teaching children the Quran, and preventing relatives from converting to Islam. Depending on specific areas and periods, Dhimmis were also restricted in the professions they could engage in, limited in travelling outside of specific areas, owning property, and were periodically exposed to forced conversions and massacres. They were also required to wear a yellow badge or other distinctive clothing, refrain from carrying weapons, and avoid riding on saddles.

== History ==
Historically, dhimmi status was originally applied to Jews, Christians, and Sabians, who are considered "People of the Book" in Islamic theology. Later, this status was also applied to Zoroastrians, Sikhs, Hindus, Jains, and Buddhists.

Jews, Christians, and others were required to pay the jizyah, and forced conversions were forbidden. Despite this nominal prohibition, instances of forced conversion are well-documented.

During the rule of al-Mutawakkil, the tenth Abbasid Caliph, numerous restrictions reinforced the second-class citizen status of dhimmīs and forced their communities into ghettos. For instance, they were required to distinguish themselves from their Muslim neighbors by their dress. They were not permitted to build new churches or synagogues or repair old churches without Muslim consent according to the Pact of Umar.

Under Sharia, the dhimmi communities were usually governed by their own laws in place of some of the laws applicable to the Muslim community. For example, the Jewish community of Medina was allowed to have its own Halakhic courts, and the Ottoman millet system allowed its various dhimmi communities to rule themselves under separate legal courts. These courts did not cover cases that involved religious groups outside of their own communities, or capital offences. Dhimmi communities were also allowed to engage in certain practices that were usually forbidden for the Muslim community, such as the consumption of alcohol and pork.

Some Muslims reject the dhimma system by arguing that it is a system which is inappropriate in the age of nation-states and democracies. There is a range of opinions among 20th-century and contemporary Islamic theologians about whether the notion of dhimma is appropriate for modern times, and, if so, what form it should take in an Islamic state.

There are differences among the Islamic Madhhabs regarding which non-Muslims can pay jizya and have dhimmi status. The Hanafi and Maliki Madhabs generally allow non-Muslims to have dhimmi status. In contrast, the Shafi'i and Hanbali Madhabs only allow Christians, Unitarians, Jews, Sabeans and Zoroastrians to have dhimmi status, and they maintain that all other non-Muslims must either convert to Islam or be fought.

== The "Dhimma contract" ==
Based on Quranic verses and Islamic traditions, sharia law distinguishes between Muslims, followers of other Abrahamic religions, and Pagans or people belonging to other polytheistic religions. As monotheists, Jews and Christians have traditionally been considered "People of the Book", and afforded a special legal status known as dhimmi derived from a theoretical contract—"dhimma" or "residence in return for taxes". Islamic legal systems based on sharia law incorporated the religious laws and courts of Christians, Jews, and Hindus, as seen in the early caliphate, al-Andalus, Indian subcontinent, and the Ottoman millet system.

In Yemenite Jewish sources, a treaty was drafted between Muhammad and his Jewish subjects, known as kitāb ḏimmat al-nabi, written in the 17th year of the Hijra (638 CE), which gave express liberty to the Jews living in Arabia to observe the Sabbath and to grow-out their side-locks, but required them to pay the jizya (poll-tax) annually for their protection. Muslim governments in the Indus basin readily extended the dhimmi status to the Hindus and Buddhists of India. Eventually, the largest school of Islamic jurisprudence applied this term to all Non-Muslims living in Muslim lands outside the sacred area surrounding Mecca, Arabia.

In medieval Islamic societies, the qadi (Islamic judge) usually could not interfere in the matters of non-Muslims unless the parties voluntarily chose to be judged according to Islamic law, thus the dhimmi communities living in Islamic states usually had their own laws independent from the sharia law, as with the Jews who would have their own rabbinical courts. These courts did not cover cases that involved other religious groups, or capital offences or threats to public order. By the 18th century, however, dhimmi frequently attended the Ottoman Muslim courts, where cases were taken against them by Muslims, or they took cases against Muslims or other dhimmi. Oaths sworn by dhimmi in these courts were tailored to their beliefs. Non-Muslims were allowed to engage in certain practices (such as the consumption of alcohol and pork) that were usually forbidden by Islamic law, in point of fact, any Muslim who pours away their wine or forcibly appropriates it is liable to pay compensation. Some Islamic theologians held that Zoroastrian "self-marriages", considered incestuous under sharia, should also be tolerated. Ibn Qayyim Al-Jawziyya (1292–1350) opined that most scholars of the Hanbali school held that non-Muslims were entitled to such practices, as long as they were not presented to sharia courts and the religious minorities in question held them to be permissible. This ruling was based on the precedent that there were no records of the Islamic prophet Muhammad forbidding such self-marriages among Zoroastrians, despite coming into contact with Zoroastrians and knowing about this practice. Religious minorities were also free to do as they wished in their own homes, provided they did not publicly engage in illicit sexual activity in ways that could threaten public morals.

There are parallels for this in Roman and Jewish law. According to law professor H. Patrick Glenn of McGill University, "[t]oday it is said that the dhimmi are 'excluded from the specifically Muslim privileges, but on the other hand they are excluded from the specifically Muslim duties' while (and here there are clear parallels with western public and private law treatment of aliens—Fremdenrecht, la condition de estrangers), '[f]or the rest, the Muslim and the dhimmi are equal in practically the whole of the law of property and of contracts and obligations'." Quoting the Qur'anic statement, "Let Christians judge according to what We have revealed in the Gospel", Muhammad Hamidullah writes that Islam decentralized and "communalized" law and justice. However, the classical dhimma contract is no longer enforced. Western influence over the Muslim world has been instrumental in eliminating the restrictions and protections of the dhimma contract.

=== The Dhimma contract and Sharia law ===
The dhimma contract is an integral part of traditional Islamic law. From the 9th century AD, the power to interpret and refine law in traditional Islamic societies was in the hands of the scholars (ulama). This separation of powers served to limit the range of actions available to the ruler, who could not easily decree or reinterpret law independently and expect the continued support of the community. Through succeeding centuries and empires, the balance between the ulema and the rulers shifted and reformed, but the balance of power was never decisively changed. At the beginning of the 19th century, the Industrial Revolution and the French Revolution introduced an era of European world hegemony that included the domination of most of the Muslim lands. At the end of the Second World War, the European powers found themselves too weakened to maintain their empires. The wide variety in forms of government, systems of law, attitudes toward modernity and interpretations of sharia are a result of the ensuing drives for independence and modernity in the Muslim world.

Muslim states, sects, schools of thought and individuals differ as to exactly what sharia law entails. In addition, Muslim states today utilize a spectrum of legal systems. Most states have a mixed system that implements certain aspects of sharia while acknowledging the supremacy of a constitution. A few, such as Turkey, have declared themselves secular. Local and customary laws may take precedence in certain matters, as well. Islamic law is therefore polynormative, and despite several cases of regression in recent years, the trend is towards liberalization.

=== The end of the Dhimma contract ===
The status of the dhimmi "was for long accepted with resignation by the Christians and with gratitude by the Jews" but the rising power of Christendom and the radical ideas of the French Revolution caused a wave of discontent among Christian dhimmis. The continuing and growing pressure from the European powers combined with pressure from Muslim reformers gradually relaxed the inequalities between Muslims and non-Muslims.

On 18 February 1856, the Ottoman Reform Edict of 1856 (Ottoman Turkish: خط همايونى, romanized: Hatt-i Humayan) was issued, building upon the 1839 edict. It came about partly as a result of pressure from and the efforts of the ambassadors of France, Austria and the United Kingdom, whose respective countries were needed as allies in the Crimean War. It again proclaimed the principle of equality between Muslims and non-Muslims, and produced many specific reforms to this end. For example, the jizya tax was abolished and non-Muslims were allowed to join the army.

According to some scholars, discrimination against dhimmis did not end with the Edict of 1856, and they remained second-class citizens at least until the end of World War I. H.E.W. Young, the British Council in Mosul, wrote in 1909, "The attitude of the Muslims toward the Christians and the Jews is that of a master towards slaves, whom he treats with a certain lordly tolerance so long as they keep their place. Any sign of pretension to equality is promptly repressed."

=== Views of modern Islamic scholars on the status of non-Muslims in an Islamic society ===
Ruhollah Khomeini	The Iranian Shia Muslim Ayatollah Ruhollah Khomeini indicates in his book Islamic Government: Governance of the Jurist that non-Muslims should be required to pay the poll tax, in return for which they would profit from the protection and services of the state; they would, however, be excluded from all participation in the political process. Bernard Lewis remarks about Khomeini that one of his main grievances against the Shah, Mohammad Reza Pahlavi, was that his legislation allowed the theoretical possibility of non-Muslims exercising political or judicial authority over Muslims.
Yusuf al-Qaradawi	The Egyptian theologian Yusuf al-Qaradawi, chairman of the International Union of Muslim Scholars, has stated in his Al Jazeera program Sharia and Life, which has an estimated audience of 35 to 60 million viewers: "When we say dhimmis (ahl al-dhimma) it means that [...] they are under the covenant of God and His Messenger and the Muslim community and their responsibility (ḍamān), and it is everyone's duty to protect them, and this is what is intended by the word. At present many of our brethren are offended by the word dhimmis, and I have stated in what I wrote in my books that I don't see anything to prevent contemporary Islamic ijtihad from discarding this word dhimmis and calling them non-Muslim citizens."
Mohammad Salim al-Awa	Another Egyptian Islamist, Mohammad Salim al-Awa argued the concept of dhimmi must be re-interpreted in the context of Egyptian nationalism. Al-Awa and other Muslim scholars based this on the idea that while the previous dhimma condition result from the Islamic conquest, the modern Egyptian state results from a joint Muslim-Christian campaign to end the British occupation of Egypt. In modern-day Egypt, he argues, the constitution replaces the dhimma contract.
Muhammad Husayn Tabataba'i	Muhammad Husayn Tabataba'i, a 20th-century Shia scholar writes that dhimmis should be treated "in a good and decent manner". He addresses the argument that good treatment of dhimmis was abrogated by Quranic verse 9:29 by stating that, in the literal sense, this verse is not in conflict with good treatment of dhimmis.
Javed Ahmad Ghamidi	Javed Ahmad Ghamidi, a Pakistani theologian, writes in Mizan that certain directives of the Quran were specific only to Muhammad against peoples of his times, besides other directives, the campaign involved asking the polytheists of Arabia for submission to Islam as a condition for exoneration and the others for jizya and submission to the political authority of the Muslims for exemption from capital punishment and for military protection as the dhimmis of the Muslims. Therefore, after Muhammad and his companions, there is no concept in Islam obliging Muslims to wage war for propagation or implementation of Islam.
Naser Makarem Shirazi	The Iranian Shia jurist Grand Ayatollah Naser Makarem Shirazi states in Selection of the Tafsir Nemooneh that the main philosophy of jizya is that it is only a financial aid to those Muslims who are in the charge of safeguarding the security of the state and dhimmis' lives and properties on their behalf.
Fahmi Huwaidi/Tarek El-Bishry	Prominent Islamic thinkers like Fahmi Huwaidi and Tarek El-Bishry have based their justification for full citizenship of non-Muslims in an Islamic states on the precedent set by Muhammad in the Constitution of Medina. They argue that in this charter the People of Book, have the status of citizens (muwatinun) rather than dhimmis, sharing equal rights and duties with Muslims.
L. Ali Khan	Legal scholar L. Ali Khan also points to the Constitution of Medina as a way forward for Islamic states in his 2006 paper titled The Medina Constitution. He suggests this ancient document, which governed the status of religions and races in the first Islamic state, in which Jewish tribes are "placed on an equal footing with [...] Muslims" and granted "the freedom of religion", can serve as a basis for the protection of minority rights, equality, and religious freedom in the modern Islamic state.
Tariq Ramadan	Tariq Ramadan, Professor of Islamic Studies at the University of Oxford, advocates the inclusion of academic disciplines and Islamic society, along with traditional Islamic scholars, in an effort to reform Islamic law and address modern conditions. He speaks of remaining faithful to the higher objectives of sharia law. He posits universal rights of dignity, welfare, freedom, equality and justice in a religiously and culturally pluralistic Islamic (or other) society, and proposes a dialogue regarding the modern term "citizenship," although it has no clear precedent in classical fiqh. He further includes the terms "non-citizen", "foreigner", "resident" and "immigrant" in this dialogue, and challenges not only Islam, but modern civilization as a whole, to come to terms with these concepts in a meaningful way with regards to problems of racism, discrimination and oppression.

== Dhimmi communities ==
Jews and Christians living under early Muslim rule were considered dhimmis, a status that was later also extended to other non-Muslims like Hindus and Buddhists. They were allowed to "freely practice their religion, and to enjoy a large measure of communal autonomy" and guaranteed their personal safety and security of property, in return for paying tribute and acknowledging Muslim rule. Islamic law and custom prohibited the enslavement of free dhimmis within lands under Islamic rule. Taxation from the perspective of dhimmis who came under the Muslim rule, was "a concrete continuation of the taxes paid to earlier regimes" (but much lower under the Muslim rule). They were also exempted from the zakat tax paid by Muslims (instead paying their own religious dues such as tithes). The dhimmi communities living in Islamic states had their own laws independent from the Sharia law, such as the Jews who had their own Halakhic courts. The dhimmi communities had their own leaders, courts, personal and religious laws, and "generally speaking, Muslim tolerance of unbelievers was far better than anything available in Christendom, until the rise of secularism in the 17th century". "Muslims guaranteed freedom of worship and livelihood, provided that they remained loyal to the Muslim state and paid a poll tax". "Muslim governments appointed Christian and Jewish professionals to their bureaucracies", and thus, Christians and Jews "contributed to the making of the Islamic civilization".

However, dhimmis faced social and symbolic restrictions, and a pattern of stricter, then more lax, enforcement developed over time. Marshall Hodgson, a historian of Islam, writes that during the era of the High Caliphate (7th–13th Centuries), zealous Shariah-minded Muslims gladly elaborated their code of symbolic restrictions on the dhimmis.

From an Islamic legal perspective, the pledge of protection granted dhimmis the freedom to practice their religion and spared them forced conversions. The dhimmis also served a variety of useful purposes, mostly economic, which was another point of concern to jurists. Religious minorities were free to do whatever they wished in their own homes, but could not "publicly engage in illicit sex in ways that threaten public morals". In some cases, religious practices that Muslims found repugnant were allowed. One example was the Zoroastrian practice of incestuous "self-marriage" where a man could marry his mother, sister or daughter. According to the medieval Islamic legal scholar Ibn Qayyim al-Jawziyya, non-Muslims had the right to engage in such religious practices even if it offended Muslims, under the conditions that such cases not be presented to Islamic Sharia courts and that these religious minorities believed that the practice in question is permissible according to their religion. This ruling was based on the precedent that Muhammad did not forbid such self-marriages among Zoroastrians despite coming in contact with them and having knowledge of their practices.

The Arabs generally established garrisons outside towns in the conquered territories, and had little interaction with the local dhimmi populations for purposes other than the collection of taxes. The conquered Christian, Jewish, Mazdean and Buddhist communities were otherwise left to lead their lives as before.

=== Christians ===
According to historians Lewis and Stillman, local Christians in Syria, Iraq, and Egypt were non-Chalcedonians and many may have felt better off under early Muslim rule than under that of the Byzantine Orthodox of Constantinople. In 1095, Pope Urban II urged western European Christians to come to the aid of the Christians of Palestine. The subsequent Crusades brought Roman Catholic Christians into contact with Orthodox Christians whose beliefs they discovered to differ from their own perhaps more than they had realized, and whose position under the rule of the Muslim Fatimid Caliphate was less uncomfortable than had been supposed. Consequently, the Eastern Christians provided perhaps less support to the Crusaders than had been expected. When the Arab East came under Ottoman rule in the 16th century, Christian populations and fortunes rebounded significantly. The Ottomans had long experience dealing with Christian and Jewish minorities, and were more tolerant towards religious minorities than the former Muslim rulers, the Mamluks of Egypt.

However, Christians living under Islamic rule have suffered certain legal disadvantages and at times persecution. In the Ottoman Empire, in accordance with the dhimmi system implemented in Muslim countries, they, like all other Christians and also Jews, were accorded certain freedoms. The dhimmi system in the Ottoman Empire was largely based upon the Pact of Umar. The client status established the rights of the non-Muslims to property, livelihood and freedom of worship but they were in essence treated as second-class citizens in the empire and referred to in Turkish as gavours, a pejorative word meaning "infidel" or "unbeliever". The clause of the Pact of Umar which prohibited non-Muslims from building new places of worship was historically imposed on some communities of the Ottoman Empire and ignored in other cases, at discretion of the local authorities. Although there were no laws mandating religious ghettos, this led to non-Muslim communities being clustered around existing houses of worship.

In addition to other legal limitations, dhimmis, including the Christians among them, were not considered equals to Muslims and several prohibitions were placed on them. Their testimony against Muslims was inadmissible in courts of law wherein a Muslim could be punished; this meant that their testimony could only be considered in commercial cases. They were forbidden to carry weapons or ride atop horses and camels. Their houses could not overlook those of Muslims; and their religious practices were severely circumscribed (e.g., the ringing of church bells was strictly forbidden).

=== Jews ===
Because the early Islamic conquests initially preserved much of the existing administrative machinery and culture, in many territories they amounted to little more than a change of rulers for the subject populations, which "brought peace to peoples demoralized and disaffected by the casualties and heavy taxation that resulted from the years of Byzantine-Persian warfare".

María Rosa Menocal, argues that the Jewish dhimmis living under the caliphate, while allowed fewer rights than Muslims, were still better off than in the Christian parts of Europe. Jews from other parts of Europe made their way to al-Andalus, where in parallel to Christian sects regarded as heretical by Catholic Europe, they were not just tolerated, but where opportunities to practice faith and trade were open without restriction save for the prohibitions on proselytization.

Bernard Lewis states:

Generally, the Jewish people were allowed to practice their religion and live according to the laws and scriptures of their community. Furthermore, the restrictions to which they were subject were social and symbolic rather than tangible and practical in character. That is to say, these regulations served to define the relationship between the two communities, and not to oppress the Jewish population.

Professor of Jewish medieval history at Hebrew University of Jerusalem, Hayim Hillel Ben-Sasson, notes:

The legal and security situation of the Jews in the Muslim world was generally better than in Christendom, because in the former, Jews were not the sole "infidels", because in comparison to the Christians, Jews were less dangerous and more loyal to the Muslim regime, and because the rapidity and the territorial scope of the Muslim conquests imposed upon them a reduction in persecution and a granting of better possibility for the survival of members of other faiths in their lands.

According to the French historian Claude Cahen, Islam has "shown more toleration than Europe towards the Jews who remained in Muslim lands."

Comparing the treatment of Jews in the medieval Islamic world and medieval Christian Europe, Mark R. Cohen notes that, in contrast to Jews in Christian Europe, the "Jews in Islam were well integrated into the economic life of the larger society", and that they were allowed to practice their religion more freely than they could do in Christian Europe.

According to the scholar Mordechai Zaken, tribal chieftains (also known as aghas) in tribal Muslim societies such as the Kurdish society in Kurdistan would tax their Jewish subjects. The Jews were in fact civilians protected by their chieftains in and around their communities; in return they paid part of their harvest as dues, and contributed their skills and services to their patron chieftain.

=== Hindus and Buddhists ===
By the 10th century, the Turks of Central Asia had invaded the Indo-Gangetic plains, and spread Islam in Northwestern parts of India. At the end of the 12th century, the Muslims advanced quickly into the Ganges Plain. In one decade, a Muslim army led by Turkic slaves consolidated resistance around Lahore (Punjab) and brought today's northern India, as far as Bengal, under Muslim rule. From these Turkic slaves would come sultans, including the founder of the sultanate of Delhi. By the 15th century, major parts of Northern India was ruled by Muslim rulers, mostly descended from invaders. In the 16th century, India came under the influence of the Mughals. Babur, the first ruler of the Mughal empire, established a foothold in the north which paved the way for further expansion by his successors.

== Restrictions ==
There were a number of restrictions on dhimmis. In a modern sense the dhimmis would be described as second-class citizens. According to historian Marshall Hodgson, from very early times Muslim rulers would very often humiliate and punish dhimmis (usually Christians or Jews that refused to convert to Islam). It was official policy that dhimmis should “feel inferior and to know ‘their place".

Although dhimmis were allowed to perform their religious rituals, they were obliged to do so in a manner not conspicuous to Muslims. Loud prayers were forbidden, as were the ringing of church bells and the blowing of the shofar. They were also not allowed to build or repair churches and synagogues without Muslim consent. Moreover, dhimmis were not allowed to seek converts among Muslims. In Mamluk Egypt, where non-Mamluk Muslims were not allowed to ride horses and camels, dhimmis were prohibited even from riding donkeys inside cities. Sometimes, Muslim rulers issued regulations requiring dhimmis to attach distinctive signs to their houses.

Most of the restrictions were social and symbolic in nature, and a pattern of stricter, then more lax, enforcement developed over time. The major financial disabilities of the dhimmi were the jizya, poll tax and the fact dhimmis and Muslims could not inherit from each other. That would create an incentive to convert if someone from the family had already converted. Ira M. Lapidus states that the "payment of the poll tax seems to have been regular, but other obligations were inconsistently enforced and did not prevent many non-Muslims from being important political, business, and scholarly figures. In the late ninth and early tenth centuries, Jewish bankers and financiers were important at the 'Abbasid court." The jurists and scholars of Islamic sharia law called for humane treatment of the dhimmis.

A Muslim man may marry a Jewish or Christian dhimmī woman, who may keep her own religion (though her children were automatically considered Muslims and had to be raised as such), but a Muslim woman cannot marry a dhimmī man unless he converts to Islam. Dhimmīs are prohibited from converting Muslims under severe penalties, while Muslims are encouraged to convert dhimmīs.

=== Jizya tax ===
Payment of the jizya obligated Muslim authorities to protect dhimmis in civil and military matters. Sura 9 (At-Tawba), verse 29 stipulates that jizya be exacted from non-Muslims as a condition required for jihad to cease. Islamic jurists required adult, free, healthy males among the dhimma community to pay the jizya, while exempting women, children, the elderly, slaves, those affected by mental or physical handicaps, and travelers who did not settle in Muslim lands. According to Abu Yusuf dhimmi should be imprisoned until they pay the jizya in full. Other jurists specified that dhimmis who don't pay jizya should have their heads shaved and made to wear a dress distinctive from those dhimmis who paid the jizya and Muslims.

Lewis states there are varying opinions among scholars as to how much of a burden jizya was. According to Norman Stillman: "jizya and kharaj were a "crushing burden for the non-Muslim peasantry who eked out a bare living in a subsistence economy." Both agree that ultimately, the additional taxation on non-Muslims was a critical factor that drove many dhimmis to leave their religion and accept Islam. However, in some regions the jizya on populations was significantly lower than the zakat, meaning dhimmi populations maintained an economic advantage. According to Cohen, taxation, from the perspective of dhimmis who came under Muslim rule, was "a concrete continuation of the taxes paid to earlier regimes". Lewis observes that the change from Byzantine to Arab rule was welcomed by many among the dhimmis who found the new yoke far lighter than the old, both in taxation and in other matters, and that some, even among the Christians of Syria and Egypt, preferred the rule of Islam to that of Byzantines. Montgomery Watt states, "the Christians were probably better off as dhimmis under Muslim-Arab rulers than they had been under the Byzantine Greeks." In some places, for example Egypt, the jizya was a tax incentive for Christians to convert to Islam.

Some scholars have tried compute the relative taxation on Muslims vs non-Muslims in the early Abbasid period. According to one estimate, Muslims had an average tax rate of 17–20 dirhams per person, which rose to 30 dirhams per person when in kind levies are included. Non-Muslims paid either 12, 24 or 48 dirhams per person, depending on their taxation category, though most probably paid 12.

The importance of dhimmis as a source of revenue for the Rashidun Caliphate is illustrated in a letter ascribed to Umar I and cited by Abu Yusuf: "if we take dhimmis and share them out, what will be left for the Muslims who come after us? By God, Muslims would not find a man to talk to and profit from his labors."

The early Islamic scholars took a relatively humane and practical attitude towards the collection of jizya, compared to the 11th century commentators writing when Islam was under threat both at home and abroad.

The jurist Abu Yusuf, the chief judge of the caliph Harun al-Rashid, rules as follows regarding the manner of collecting the jizya

No one of the people of the dhimma should be beaten in order to exact payment of the jizya, nor made to stand in the hot sun, nor should hateful things be inflicted upon their bodies, or anything of that sort. Rather they should be treated with leniency.

In the border provinces, dhimmis were sometimes recruited for military operations. In such cases, they were exempted from jizya for the year of service.

=== Administration of law ===
Religious pluralism existed in medieval Islamic law and ethics. The religious laws and courts of other religions, including Christianity, Judaism and Hinduism, were usually accommodated within the Islamic legal framework, as exemplified in the Caliphate, Al-Andalus, Ottoman Empire and Indian subcontinent. In medieval Islamic societies, the qadi (Islamic judge) usually could not interfere in the matters of non-Muslims unless the parties voluntarily chose to be judged according to Islamic law. The dhimmi communities living in Islamic states usually had their own laws independent from the Sharia law, such as the Jews who had their own Halakha courts.

Dhimmis were allowed to operate their own courts following their own legal systems. However, dhimmis frequently attended the Muslim courts in order to record property and business transactions within their own communities. Cases were taken out against Muslims, against other dhimmis and even against members of the dhimmi's own family. Dhimmis often took cases relating to marriage, divorce or inheritance to the Muslim courts so these cases would be decided under sharia law. Oaths sworn by dhimmis in the Muslim courts were sometimes the same as the oaths taken by Muslims, sometimes tailored to the dhimmis' beliefs.

Muslim men could generally marry dhimmi women who are considered People of the Book, however Islamic jurists rejected the possibility any non-Muslim man might marry a Muslim woman. Bernard Lewis notes that "similar position existed under the laws of Byzantine Empire, according to which a Christian could marry a Jewish woman, but a Jew could not marry a Christian woman under pain of death".

== Relevant texts ==
=== Quranic verses as a basis for Islamic policies toward dhimmis ===
Lewis states

- Al-Baqara 256 "Let there be no compulsion in religion: ...",^{[ 2:256]} means non-Muslims should not be forced to adopt Islam
- The phrase "Unto you your religion, and unto me my religion.", from Surah Al-Kafirun 109:6 has been used as a "proof-text for pluralism and coexistence".
- Surah Al-Baqara 2:62 has served to justify the tolerated position accorded to the followers of Christianity, Judaism, and Sabianism under Muslim rule.

=== Hadith ===
A hadith by Muhammad, "Whoever killed a muʿāhid (a person who is granted the pledge of protection by the Muslims) shall not smell the fragrance of Paradise though its fragrance can be smelt at a distance of forty years (of traveling).", is cited as a foundation for the right of non-Muslim citizens to live peacefully and undisturbed in an Islamic state. Anwar Shah Kashmiri writes in his commentary on Sahih al-Bukhari Fayd al-Bari on this hadith: "You know the gravity of sin for killing a Muslim, for its odiousness has reached the point of disbelief, and it necessitates that [the killer abides in Hell] forever. As for killing a non-Muslim citizen [muʿāhid], it is similarly no small matter, for the one who does it will not smell the fragrance of Paradise."

A similar hadith in regard to the status of the dhimmis: "Whoever wrongs one with whom a compact (treaty) has been made [i.e., a dhimmi] and lays on him a burden beyond his strength, I will be his accuser."

=== Constitution of Medina ===
The Constitution of Medina, a formal agreement between Muhammad and all the significant tribes and families of Medina (including Muslims, Jews and pagans), declared that non-Muslims in the Ummah had the following rights:

1. The security (dhimma) of God is equal for all groups,
2. Non-Muslim members have equal political and cultural rights as Muslims. They will have autonomy and freedom of religion.
3. Non-Muslims will take up arms against the enemy of the Ummah and share the cost of war. There is to be no treachery between the two.
4. Non-Muslims will not be obliged to take part in religious wars of the Muslims.

=== Khaybar agreement ===
A precedent for the dhimma contract was established with the agreement between Muhammad and the Jews after the Battle of Khaybar, an oasis near Medina. Khaybar was the first territory attacked and conquered by Muslims. When the Jews of Khaybar surrendered to Muhammad after a siege, Muhammad allowed them to remain in Khaybar in return for handing over to the Muslims one half their annual produce.

=== Pact of Umar ===
The Pact of Umar, traditionally believed to be between caliph Umar and the conquered Jerusalem Christians in the seventh century, was another source of regulations pertaining to dhimmis. However, Western orientalists doubt the authenticity of the pact, arguing it is usually the victors and not the vanquished who impose rather than propose, the terms of peace, and that it is highly unlikely that the people who spoke no Arabic and knew nothing of Islam could draft such a document. Academic historians believe the Pact of Umar in the form it is known today was a product of later jurists who attributed it to Umar in order to lend greater authority to their own opinions. The similarities between the Pact of Umar and the Theodosian and Justinian Codes of the Eastern Roman Empire suggest that perhaps much of the Pact of Umar was borrowed from these earlier codes by later Islamic jurists. At least some of the clauses of the pact mirror the measures first introduced by the Umayyad caliph Umar II or by the early Abbasid caliphs.

== Cultural interactions and cultural differences ==
During the Middle Ages, local associations known as futuwwa clubs developed across the Islamic lands. There were usually several futuwwah in each town. These clubs catered to varying interests, primarily sports, and might involve distinctive manners of dress and custom. They were known for their hospitality, idealism and loyalty to the group. They often had a militaristic aspect, purportedly for the mutual protection of the membership. These clubs commonly crossed social strata, including among their membership local notables, dhimmi and slaves – to the exclusion of those associated with the local ruler, or amir.

Muslims and Jews were sometimes partners in trade, with the Muslim taking days off on Fridays and Jews taking off on Saturdays.

Andrew Wheatcroft describes how some social customs such as different conceptions of dirt and cleanliness made it difficult for the religious communities to live close to each other, either under Muslim or under Christian rule.

== 20th century ==
Allal al-Fassi, a Moroccan politician, invoked the concept of dhimmi status to deny Moroccan Jews full Moroccan identity: "He who says Moroccan, says Muslim. Moroccan nationality was created by the French Protectorate. All Moroccans are Muslim: the 'Moroccan' Jew is only a dhimmi."

== 21st century ==
The dhimma and the jizya poll tax are no longer imposed in Muslim majority countries. In the 21st century, jizya is widely regarded as being at odds with contemporary secular conceptions of citizens' civil rights and equality before the law, although there have been reports of religious minorities in conflict zones and areas subject to political instability being forced to pay jizya.

In 2009, it was reported that the Taliban imposed the jizya on Pakistan's minority Sikh community after occupying some of the Sikhs’ homes and kidnapping a Sikh leader.

In 2013, the Muslim Brotherhood in Egypt occupied the town of Dalga immediately following the overthrow of Mohammed Morsi on 3 July, and reportedly imposed jizya taxes on the 15,000 Christian Copts living in the town. In autumn of that same year, Egyptian authorities were able to retake control of the town, following two prior failed attempts.

In February 2014, the Islamic State of Iraq and the Levant (ISIL) announced that it intended to extract jizya payments from Christians in the city of Raqqa, Syria, which ISIL controlled at the time. Christians who refused to accept the dhimma contract and pay the jizya tax would have to convert to Islam, leave, or be executed. Twice per year: wealthy Christians would have to pay half an ounce of gold — the 2014 currency equivalent of $664 ($903.00 in 2025); middle-class Christians would have to pay half that amount; and poorer Christians would be charged one-fourth that amount. In June 2014, the Institute for the Study of War reported that ISIL claims to have collected jizya and fay.

On 18 July 2014, ISIL ordered the Christians in Mosul, Iraq, to accept the dhimma contract and pay the jizya, or convert to Islam. If they refused to accept either of the options, the Christians would be murdered.

== See also ==
- Dhimmitude – Characterization of the status of non-Muslims under Islamic rule
- Gentile – Term referring to a non-Jew
- Islam and other religions
- Ger toshav – Non-Jewish resident in the Land of Israel
- Jizyah – Islamic tax on non-Muslims
- Musta'min – Islamic term for non-Muslims temporarily residing in Muslim-ruled lands
- Persecution of Buddhists
- Persecution of Christians
- Persecution of Hindus
- Persecution of Jews
- Religious discrimination – Treating a person or group differently because of their religious beliefs
- Zunnar – Type of identifying mark in historic Islamic societies
