= Khairat el-Shater =

Egyptian politician (born 1950)

- محمد خيرت الشاطر
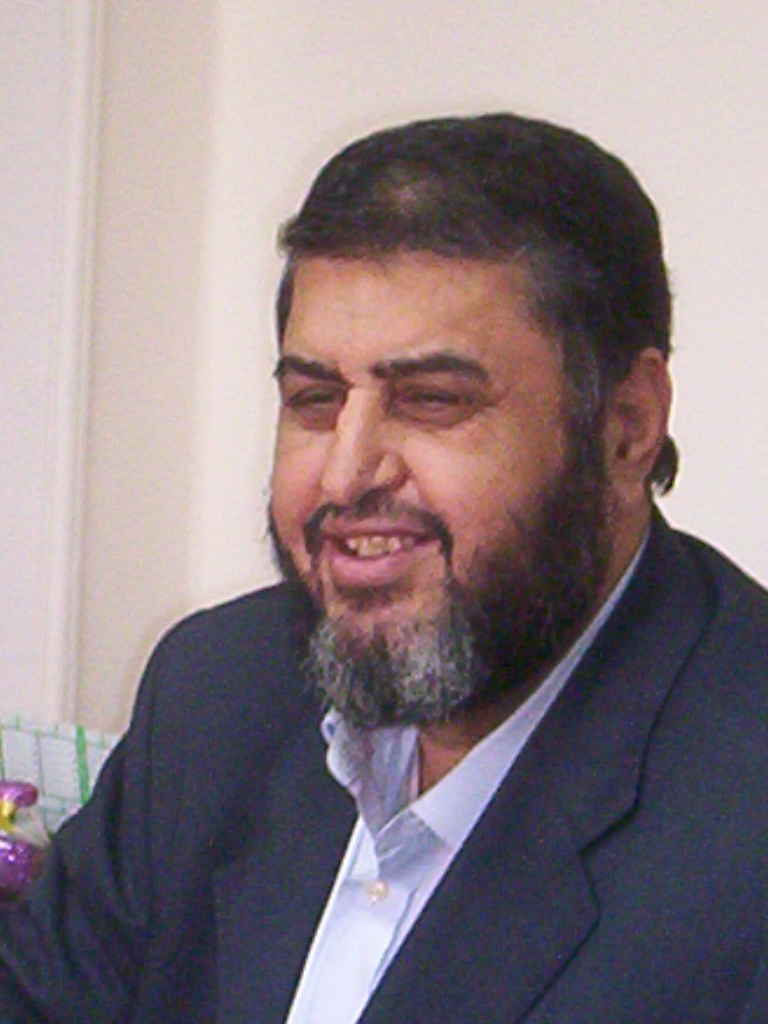
- Khairat el-Shater in 2004

Personal details
- Born: Mohammed Khairat Saad el-Shater; 4 May 1950 (age 76) Kafr Al-Teraa Al-Qadimah, Dakahlia, Egypt
- Party: Freedom and Justice Party
- Other political affiliations: Muslim Brotherhood
- Education: Alexandria University; Mansoura University
- Profession: Engineer
- Website: www.khairatshater.com

Mohammed Khairat Saad el-Shater (Arabic: محمد خيرت سعد الشاطر, IPA: [mæˈħæmmæd ˈxæjɾæt ˈsæʕd eʃˈʃɑːtˤeɾ]; born 4 May 1950) is an Egyptian engineer, businessman and Islamist political activist. A leading member of the Muslim Brotherhood, as the Deputy Supreme Guide, el-Shater was the initial candidate of the movement's Freedom and Justice Party during the 2012 Egyptian presidential election before being disqualified by the election commission. Previously, he was the deputy chairman of the Brotherhood.

== Life and career ==
Born in Kafr Al-Teraa Al-Qadimah, Dakahlia, el-Shater joined the youth wing of the ruling Arab Socialist Union party at age 16, during the presidency of Gamal Abdel Nasser. He studied engineering at the Alexandria University. There he participated in the February 1968 student protests against the government. After serving in the military for two years, el-Shater studied for a master's degree and worked as a lecturer at the Mansoura University. After the assassination of President EL Sadat in 1981, el-Shater was exiled as an Islamist dissident, and left for England. After returning in the mid-1980s, he became an active member of the Muslim Brotherhood. In 1995, he became head of the Brotherhood's Greater Cairo branch.

El-Shater led a successful furniture and textile business with branches in Cairo's luxurious shopping malls, which earned him a fortune of several millions. He is considered a main financier and chief strategist of the Brotherhood. Under the Mubarak regime, he was imprisoned from 2007 until his release by the Supreme Council of the Armed Forces in March 2011. Following the victory of the Freedom and Justice Party (parliamentary wing of the Muslim Brotherhood) in the 2011/12 parliamentary election, el-Shater was tipped as a likely candidate for Prime Minister of a coalition government. The Middle East researcher Avi Asher-Schapiro considers el-Shater to be a strong advocate of privatization and free market.

Even though he is the nominal number two in the Brotherhood's hierarchy, some consider him its actual leader. In the eyes of many analysts and activists, he is one of the main reasons behind the anti-revolutionary style of politics the MB followed since the fall of Mubarak. He is also claimed to be responsible for the expulsion of the dissident Brotherhood member Abdel Moneim Aboul Fotouh and his supporters.

== Presidential candidacy ==
On 31 March 2012 the Freedom and Justice Party named him their candidate for the presidential election in May. El-Shater formally resigned from the Brotherhood in order to run for president and to avoid violating the Brotherhood's pledge not to field a candidate. The announcement of Shater's presidential candidacy was a historical first for the 83-year-old group, which originally pledged that none of their members would run for president to calm secular and western governments' fears of a complete Islamist takeover by the group. Earlier in 2012, Khairat El-Shater had denied any intentions for entering the presidential race on Al Jazeera, after Ahmed Mansour, host of the show Without Limits (bilā ḥudūd بلا حدود), had subtly questioned the sequence of events which later took place on 31 March 2012. The Egyptian Supreme Council of the Armed Forces barred El-Shater from the presidential race on 14 April 2012, stating that he was only released from prison in March 2011, in violation of election rules stating that a candidate has to be released from prison for 6 years before he can become a candidate.

== Arrest ==
El-Shater was arrested on 5 July 2013, following the revolution which unseated the Brotherhood-led government and President Mohamed Morsi. On 14 July 2013 Egypt's General Prosecutor Hisham Barakat (later assassinated) ordered his assets to be frozen. On 29 October 2013, a three-judge panel at Cairo Criminal Court stepped down from the proceedings, citing "uneasiness" over the trial. On 11 December 2013, a second panel of judges withdrew from the trial. On 28 February 2015, he was sentenced to life in prison. On 16 May 2015, another court issued a preliminary death sentence against him in a separate case. Both verdicts can be appealed.
