= Khitan (circumcision) =

Islamic rite of male circumcision

Khitan (Arabic: ختان) or Khatna (Arabic: ختنة) is the Arabic term for circumcision, and the Islamic term for the practice of religious male circumcision in Islamic culture. Male circumcision is widespread in the Muslim world, and accepted as an established practice by all Islamic schools of jurisprudence. It is considered a sign of belonging to the wider Muslim community (Ummah).

Islamic male circumcision is analogous but not identical to Jewish male circumcision (Brit milah). Muslims are currently the largest single religious group in which the practice is widespread, although circumcision is not mentioned in the Quran itself but is mentioned in the ḥadīth literature and sunnah (accounts of the sayings and living habits attributed to the Islamic prophet Muhammad during his lifetime). Accordingly, in Iran, South Asia, Central Asia, Russia, Turkey, and the Balkans, derivatives of the word sunnah are used to refer to male circumcision. The same applies to the word Khitan in the Arabic language, which can refer to both genders.

== Religious sources ==
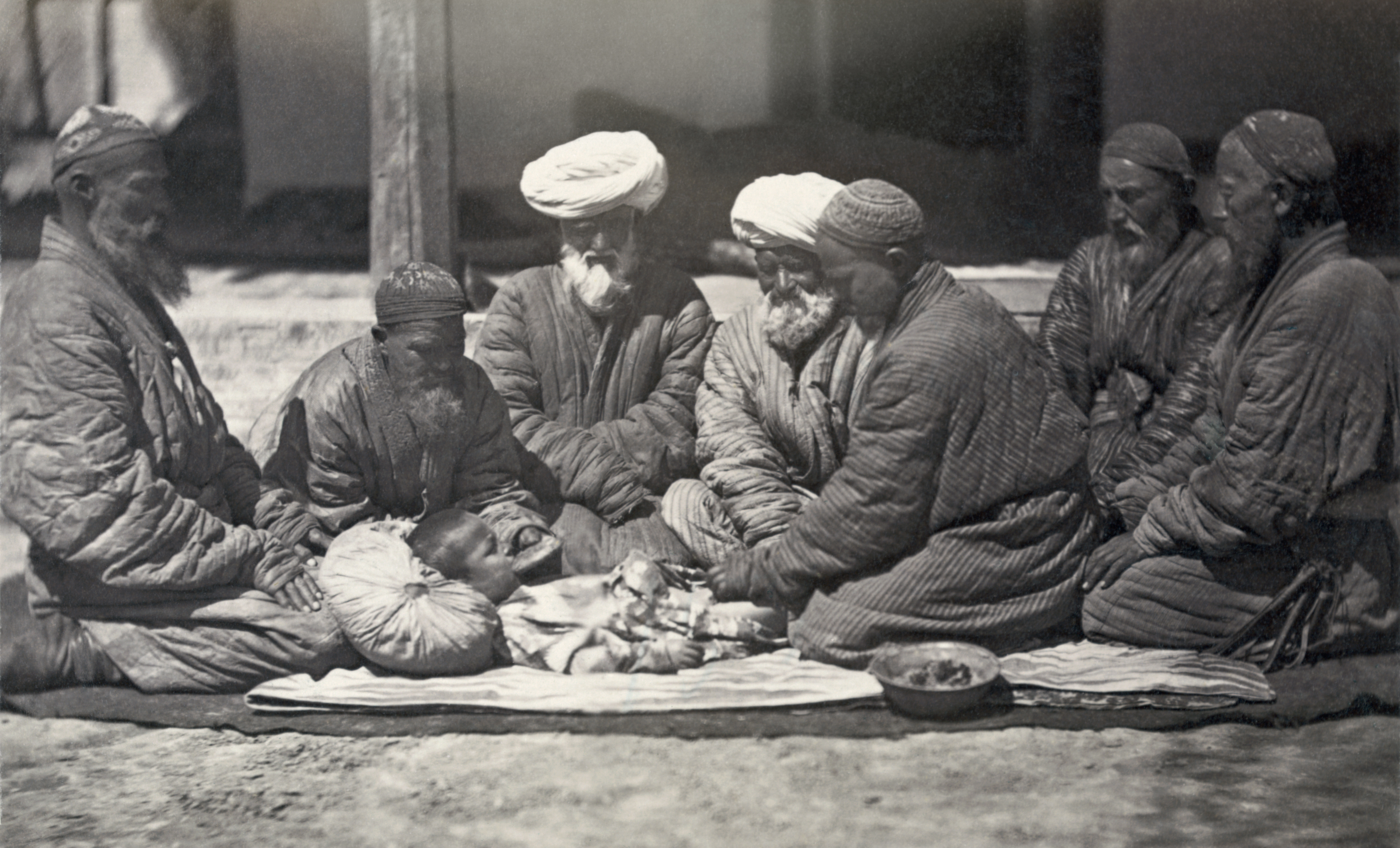
Circumcision being performed in Central Asia, c. 1865–1872. Restored albumen print.

The Quran itself does not mention circumcision explicitly in any verse. In the time of the Islamic prophet Muhammad, both male and female circumcision were carried out by Pagan Arabian tribes, and male circumcision was performed by the Jewish tribes of Arabia for religious reasons. This has also been attested by the classical Muslim scholar al-Jāḥiẓ, as well as by the Roman-Jewish historian Flavius Josephus.

According to some ḥadīth reports, Muhammad was born without a foreskin, while others maintain that his grandfather, ʿAbd al-Muṭṭalib, circumcised him when he was seven days old. Some ḥadīth report that Heraclius, Emperor of the Byzantine Empire, had referred to Muhammad as "the king of the circumcised".

Some ḥadīth reports mention circumcision in a list of practices known as fitra (acts considered to be of a refined person). Abū Hurayra, one of the companions of Muhammad, was quoted saying:

"five things are fitra: circumcision, shaving pubic hair with a razor, trimming the mustache, paring one's nails and plucking the hair from one's armpits" (reported in the ḥadīth of Sahih al-Bukhari and Sahih Muslim).

However, there are other ḥadīth which do not name circumcision as part of the characteristics of fitra. Hence, the different hadiths do not agree on whether circumcision is part of fitra or not.

Muhammad's wife Aisha supposedly quoted Muhammad as saying that: "if the two circumcised parts have been in touch with one another, ghusl (ritual purification) is necessary." According to some other ḥadīth reports, Muhammad supposedly circumcised his grandsons, Ḥasan ibn ʿAlī and Ḥusayn ibn ʿAlī, on the seventh day after their birth. Sahih al-Bukhari and Sahih Muslim also quote Muhammad saying that Abraham performed his own circumcision at the age of eighty. It is also reported by Abū Dāwūd and Aḥmad ibn Ḥanbal that Muhammad stated that circumcision was a "law for men and a preservation of honor for women". Many scholars consider narrations regarding female circumcision to not be authentic and consider it a cultural practice rather than a religious one.

According to historians of religion and scholars of religious studies, the Islamic tradition of circumcision was derived from the pagan practices and rituals of pre-Islamic Arabia. Circumcision was introduced to many lands of the Middle East and North Africa for the first time through Islam itself following the early Muslim conquests under the Rāshidūn Caliphate, whose commanders were the companions and contemporaries of Muhammad. For example, the Persians did not practice male or female circumcision before the advent of Islam. Post-Islamic converts such as Afshin were found guilty in trials of remaining uncircumcised.

Islamic scholars have diverse opinions on the obligatory nature of male circumcision, with some considering it mandatory (wājib), while others view it as only being highly recommended (sunnah). Shīʿīte traditions, however, such as those practised in Iran, have the most stringent requirements for male circumcision, since it is seen as a ritual of purification akin to Christian baptism rather than an initiation to adulthood.

=== Sunnī Islam ===
In the Sunnī branch of Islam, the four schools of Islamic jurisprudence have different opinions and attitudes towards circumcision; some state that it is recommendable, others that it is permissible but not binding, while others regard it as a legal obligation. Amongst Muslim legal scholars (Ulama), there are differing opinions about the compulsory or non-obligatory status of circumcision in accordance with Islamic law (sharīʿa). The Shāfiʿī school of Ḥanafī jurists also consider circumcision to be recommendable exclusively for Muslim males on the seventh day after birth. Some Salafis have argued that circumcision is required in Islam to provide ritual cleanliness based on the covenant with Abraham, while the purpose of female circumcision for Muslim women is to "regulate" and reduce their sexual desires.

=== Shīa Islam ===
Within the Shīʿīte branch of Islam, some but not all Shīʿīte denominations regard the practice as obligatory. They rely on sayings that come from classical Shīʿīte Muslim scholars. In one narration Muhammad was asked if an uncircumcised man could go to pilgrimage. He answered "not as long as he is not circumcised". They quote ʿAlī ibn Abī Ṭālib as saying: "If a man becomes Muslim, he must submit to circumcision even if he is 80 years old." Another narration from Jaʿfar al-Ṣādiq, the 6th Shīʿīte Imam, says: "Circumcise your sons when they are seven days old as it is cleaner (athar) and the flesh grows faster and because the earth hates the urine of the uncircumcised." It is also believed that the urine of the uncircumcised is impure, while if one prays with unclean genitals their prayer may not be considered as acceptable, even of those who have been circumcised, meaning that it may have to be repeated again at a time when the believer has purified themselves and removed the impurity. Another hadith attributed to Muhammad states: "the earth cries out to God in anguish because of the urine of the uncircumcised", and that "the earth becomes defiled from the urine of the uncircumcised for forty days."

=== Alevism ===
Circumcision has historically been practiced among Alevis in Turkey, though it is not a religious requirement in Alevism, which places greater emphasis on ethical conduct and inner spirituality than on ritual observance. Scholars and community observers note that the practice among Alevis has primarily resulted from broader societal pressure and the influence of dominant Sunni Muslim norms rather than from Alevi religious doctrine. In recent decades, circumcision has declined, particularly among more secular Alevi families, with younger generations increasingly viewing it as unnecessary and unrelated to Alevi beliefs, and many Modern Alevis families choosing to leave the decision up to the individual.

== Procedure ==
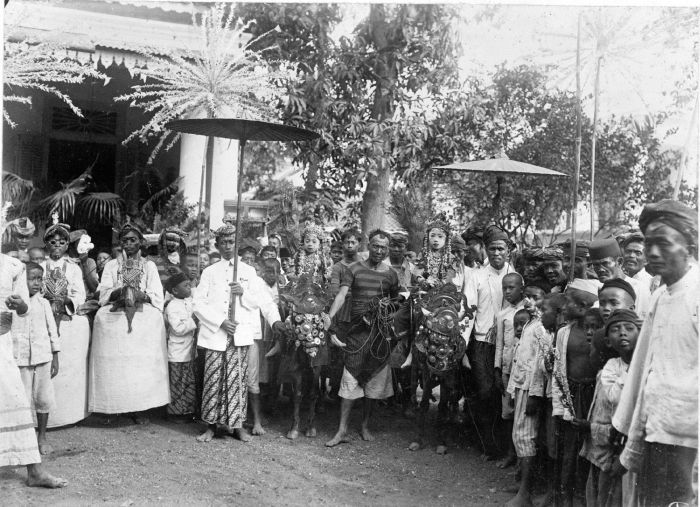
Traditional procession after the Islamic circumcision ceremony of a child in the Dutch East Indies, 1915–1918

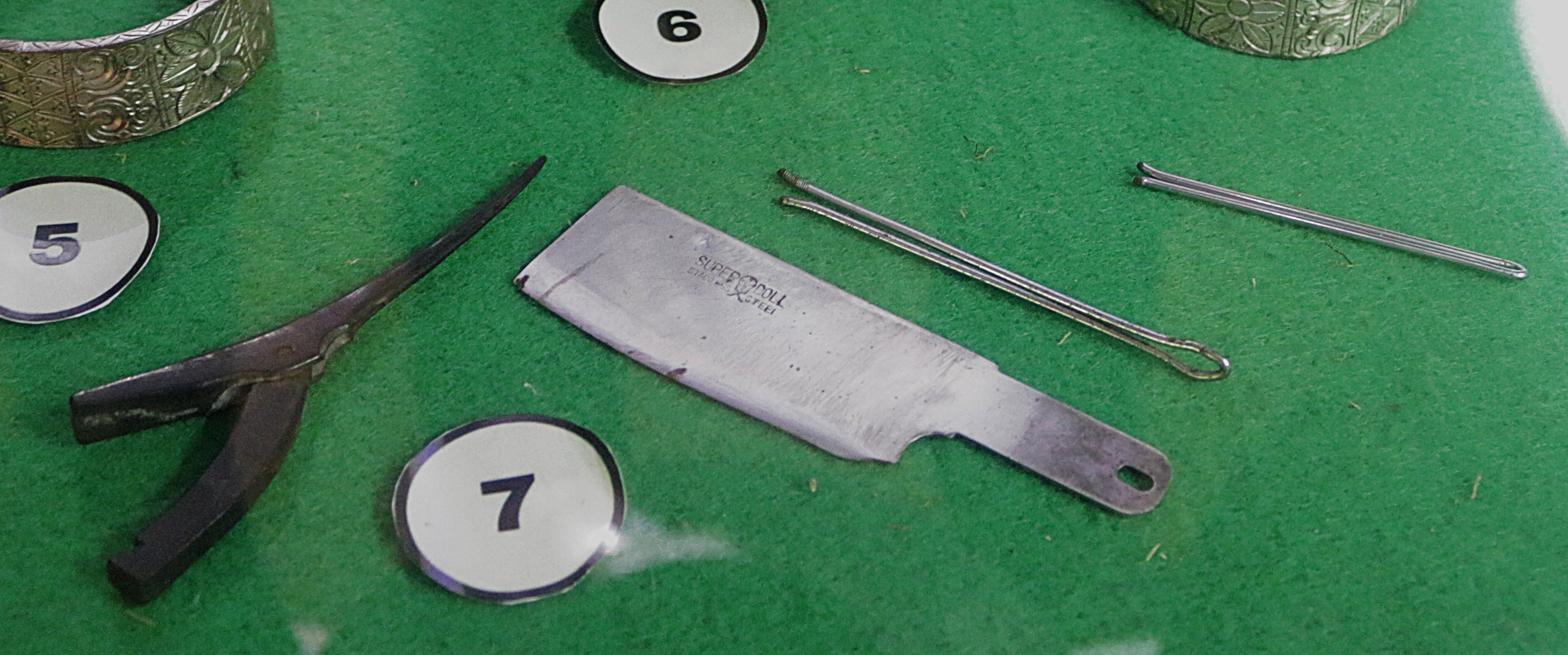
Traditional tools for khitan

Circumcisions are usually carried out in health facilities or hospitals, and performed by trained medical practitioners. The circumciser can be either male or female, and is not required to be a Muslim but must be medically trained. There is no fixed age for circumcision in Islam, and the age when boys get circumcised, and the procedures used, tends to change across countries, cultures, families, and time. In some Muslim-majority countries, circumcision is performed on Muslim boys after they have learned to recite the whole Quran from start to finish.

== Time of circumcision ==
Islamic scriptures do not fix a particular time for circumcision. Therefore, there is a wide variation in practice among Muslim communities around the world, with children often being circumcised in late childhood or early adolescence, depending on family, region, and country. The preferred age is usually seven, although some Muslims are circumcised as early as on the seventh day after birth and as late as at the commencement of puberty.

In the Western Balkans, circumcision of Muslim boys is performed mostly from age three to seven.

== Celebrations ==
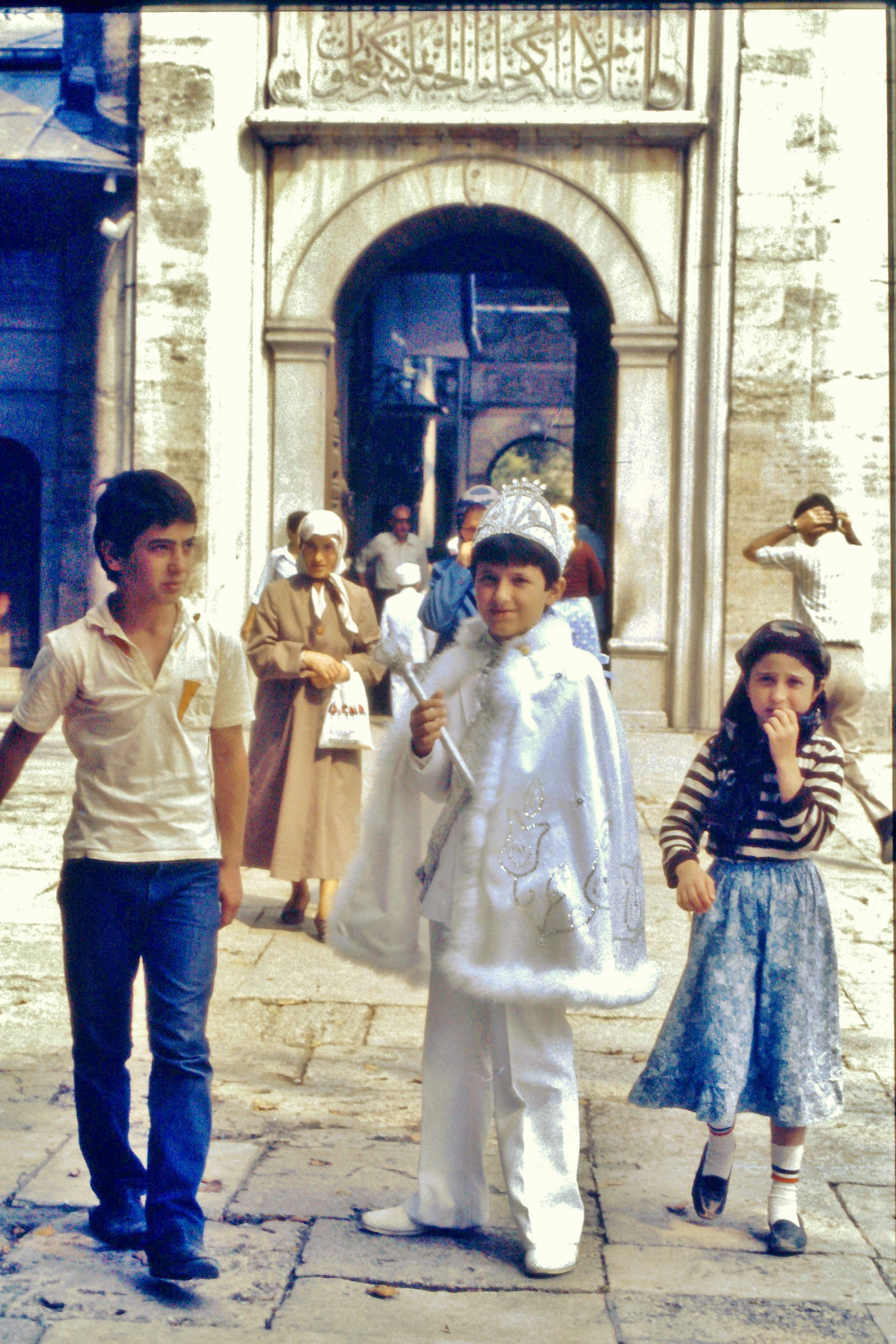
A Turkish boy in traditional circumcision costume.

The occasion is widely celebrated in Turkey and called "Sünnet Töreni", which marks the child's transition to adulthood. The custom is also done in Muslim areas in the Balkans where the celebration is called "Sunet".

== Comparisons with female circumcision ==
In Arabic, female circumcision is referred to as khafḍ (Arabic: خفض) or khifaḍ (Arabic: خِفَض). In many Muslim communities, khafḍ is a rite of passage and refers to the excision of female genital organs. The Quran does not mention male or female circumcision, and the practice in Islam generally only exists for men. Female circumcision is only considered obligatory within the Shafi'i madhhab. Female circumcision was practiced in Arabia prior to the advent of Islam. The practice persisted throughout Islamic history because female circumcision remained culturally entrenched as a rite of passage, preparing a girl for marriage.

Traditionally, Islamic scholars found justification for khafḍ in the hadiths. A hadith from the Sunan Abu Dawood collection states:

"A woman used to perform circumcision in Medina. The Prophet said to her: Do not cut severely as that is better for a woman and more desirable for a husband."

Ibn Hajar al-Asqalani describes this hadith as poor in authenticity, and quotes Ahmad Bayhaqi's opinion that it is "poor, with a broken chain of transmission". Yusuf ibn Abd-al-Barr commented:

"Those who consider (female) circumcision a sunna, use as evidence this hadith of Abu al-Malih, which is based solely on the evidence of Hajjaj ibn Artaa, who cannot be admitted as an authority when he is the sole transmitter."

Map showing the % of women and girls aged 15–49 years (unless otherwise stated) who have undergone FGM/C according to the March 2020 Global Response report. Grey countries' data are not covered.

Another hadith used in support is in Sahih Muslim: "The Messenger of Allah said: When anyone sits amidst four parts (of the woman) and the circumcised parts touch each other a bath becomes obligatory." Mohammad Salim al-Awa states that, while the hadith is authentic, it is not evidence of support for women circumcision. He states that the Arabic for "the two circumcision organs" is a single word used to connote two forms of circumcision. While the female form is used to denote both male and female genitalia, it should be considered to refer only to the male circumcised organ. A hadith in Sahih Bukhari says: "I heard the Prophet saying. "Five practices are characteristics of the Fitra: circumcision, shaving the pubic hair, cutting the moustaches short, clipping the nails, and depilating the hair of the armpits." Mohamed Salim Al-Awwa writes that it is unclear whether these requirements were meant for females.

The various schools of Sunni Islamic jurisprudence have expressed differing views on khafḍ. The Hanafi and Hanbali schools of Islamic jurisprudence view khafḍ as makruma (noble) for women, but is not required. The Maliki school recommends it, but is not required. But in the Shafi'i school, female circumcision is obligatory (wājib). Female circumcision is mostly unknown among the Shia Muslims, but male circumcision is required.

According to UNICEF, over 200 million women in Africa, the Middle East and North Africa, and Southeast Asia have been subjected to the practice and are living with female genital mutilation. In 2007, the Al-Azhar Supreme Council of Islamic Research in Cairo declared that female genital mutilation has "no basis in core Islamic law or any of its partial provisions". Egypt's religious authorities stressed that their view is against female circumcision. Grand Mufti Ali Gomaa said on the privately owned al-Mahwar network: "It's prohibited, prohibited, prohibited."

== See also ==
- Brit milah
- Religion and circumcision
  - Religion and circumcision#Christianity
  - Religion and circumcision#Druze
  - Religion and circumcision#Hinduism
  - Religion and circumcision#Sikhism
  - Religion and circumcision#Buddhism
- Circumcision controversies
- History of circumcision
- Glossary of Islam
- Outline of Islam
- Index of Islam-related articles
