= Abu Al-Izz Al-Hariri =

Egyptian politician (1946–2014)

Abu Al-Izz Al-Hariri (2 June 1946 – 3 September 2014) was an Egyptian socialist politician. He was a member of parliament for Alexandria.

He ran for president in the 2012 Egyptian presidential election as the Socialist Popular Alliance Party candidate. He placed eighth in the first round with 0.17% of the votes, or 40,090 votes. He became Egypt's youngest member of parliament in 1976.
