= Hisham Bastawisy =

Egyptian judge and the vice president of the Egyptian Court of Cassation (1951–2021)

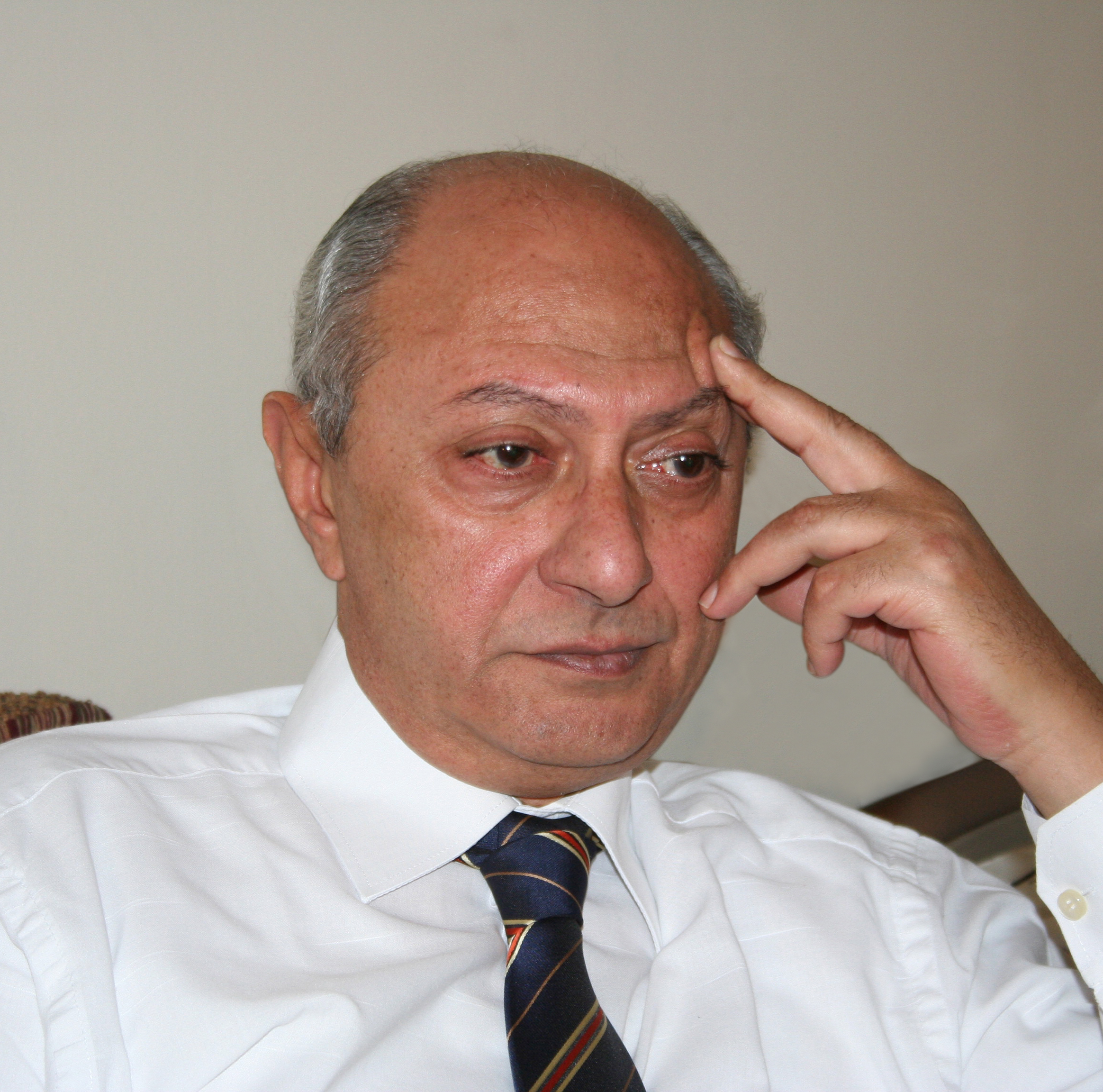

Vice President of the Egyptian Court of Cassation

Personal details
- Born: 23 May 1951 Cairo, Egypt
- Died: 17 April 2021 (aged 69)
- Party: Tagammu
- Spouse: Olfat Salah
- Education: Cairo University

Hisham Mohammed Osman Bastawisy (Arabic: هشام محمد عثمان بسطاويسي) (23 May 1951 – 17 April 2021) was an Egyptian judge and the vice president of the Egyptian Court of Cassation. He was one of the leaders of the Egyptian opposition before and during the 2011 Egyptian revolution. He ran for the office of president during the 2012 elections as a Tagammu nominee.

He died on 17 April 2021, aged 69.
