= Beginning Party =

Beginning Party حزب البداية
- Leader: Hossam El-Din Mahmood Jalal
- Founded: 3 August 2011
- House of Representatives: 0 / 568

The Beginning Party (Arabic: حزب البداية) is a political party in Egypt made up of former members of the NDP.
