= Fahmi Huwaidi =

Egyptian columnist

Fahmi Huwaidi (Arabic: فهمي هويدي; born 29 August 1937 in El Saff, Giza Governorate) is an Egyptian columnist. A "moderate Islamist", he writes for Al Jazeera and the Egyptian opposition newspaper Al-Dustour. He has been called "probably the most widely read Islamic political analyst".

In 2006, he stopped writing for Al-Ahram, for which he had written for 48 years, complaining that words had been omitted from his weekly column.
