= Quiver Party =

Political party in Egypt

Quiver Party حزب الكنانة Hezb Kenana
- Leader: Ashraf Zaky Barouma
- Founded: 2009
- House of Representatives: 0 / 568

The Egyptian Quiver Party or Egyptian Kenana Party is a political party that calls for free trade and social justice.
