= Mohammad Salim Al-Awa =

Egyptian politician

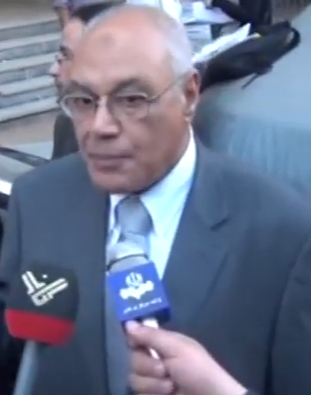
- Born: 22 December 1942 (age 83); Alexandria, Egypt.
- Occupations: Lawyer, Professor, Writer and Politician

Mohammad Salim Al-Awa (Arabic: محمد سليم العوَّا; born December 22, 1942) is an Egyptian Islamist thinker, widely considered to belong to the moderate Islamic democratic strain. He is the former Secretary General of the International Union for Muslim Scholars based in London, and head of the Egyptian Association for Culture and Dialogue, a member of the Academy of the Arabic Language in Cairo, an Advisor to the Arab Bureau of Education for the Gulf States - KSA 1979–1985. He received a PhD in Comparative Law from the University of London 1972. Al-Awa has been called one of the few Islamic thinkers who has made a "serious attempt" at "defining what Islamism would mean in a modern society," or "courageously delved into the realities of Islamic history and experimented with new interpretations."

He is considered one of the symbols of the modern trend in Islam, and his thought is characterized by moderation and focus on dialogue rather than conflict between the Islamic world and the West. He is also an advocate of dialogue and rapprochement between Sunnis and Shia'tes. He defended several members of the Muslim Brotherhood who were imprisoned during the era of Hosni Mubarak. He was one of those who strongly opposed the project of transferring power to Gamal Mubarak. On 14 June 2011, Al-Awa declared his candidacy for the 2012 Egyptian presidential election in September of that year.

== Early life and education ==
Al-Awa descends from the Al-Awa family from Damascus, the majority of whose members still live in Damascus. His grandfather, Abdullah Salim Al-Awa, chose to move and reside in Alexandria, Egypt, around 1880/1881, and married a woman originally from the city of Sohag in Upper Egypt. The first nationality law issued in Egypt included Al-Awa's grandfather and father, which considered every resident on its land since January 1, 1914, to be an Egyptian national. Thus, Muhammad Salim Al-Awa's grandfather and father only held Egyptian nationality, since the grandfather was an Ottoman subject, like all those subject to the rule of the Ottoman State, which did not have nationalities based on country of birth or residence.

He graduated from the Faculty of Law at Alexandria University in 1963, and obtained a diploma in Islamic Sharia and a diploma in public law. Bachelor of Laws, Alexandria University in 1963. Diploma in Public Law, Alexandria University in 1965.

He obtained a PhD in comparative law between English and Islamic legislation from the School of Oriental and African Studies at the University of London in 1972.
