= Gandhi as a Political Strategist =

1979 book by Gene Sharp

- Author: Gene Sharp
- Language: English
- Publisher: Porter Sargent
- Publication date: 1979
- Publication place: United States; others
- Pages: 357
- ISBN: 0-87558-090-4
- OCLC: 5591944

Gandhi as a Political Strategist is a book about the political strategies used by Mahatma Gandhi, and their ongoing implications and applicability outside of their original Indian context. Written by Gene Sharp, the book was originally published in the United States in 1979. An Indian edition was published in 1999. The book has been reviewed in several professional journals.

== Topics covered ==
Gandhi as a Political Strategist contains 13 chapters that are separated into two major parts (table below, right). All chapters are written by Sharp, who also wrote a preface. The chapters were originally published elsewhere in journals between 1957 and 1970, but were revised for this volume, sometimes extensively. An introduction by Coretta Scott King, widow of Martin Luther King Jr., states that Gandhi and King each "discovered an idea whose time had long since come," but that only with Gandhi as a Political Strategist do we have a single volume providing "an in-depth analysis of Gandhi's political strategy and its relevance for social struggle today.... a lucid, compelling case for nonviolent direct action as the most effective means for advancing social change that humankind has ever known."

Sharp's preface states that "Many of the people born in the West since 1940 or so have little idea who Gandhi was." After sketching the epoch in which Gandhi lived, Sharp states that the book's thesis is that

Gandhi was an extraordinary political strategist... an appreciation of this is necessary to understand the man and the movements with which he challenged the most vast Empire which the world had ever seen, and contributed significantly to its dissolution.... This book also suggests that we need to continue to consider Gandhi's challenge to established political tenets, his refinements of nonviolent struggle, and his perceptions of requirements for ending oppression, restructuring society, and lifting dependency on political violence.

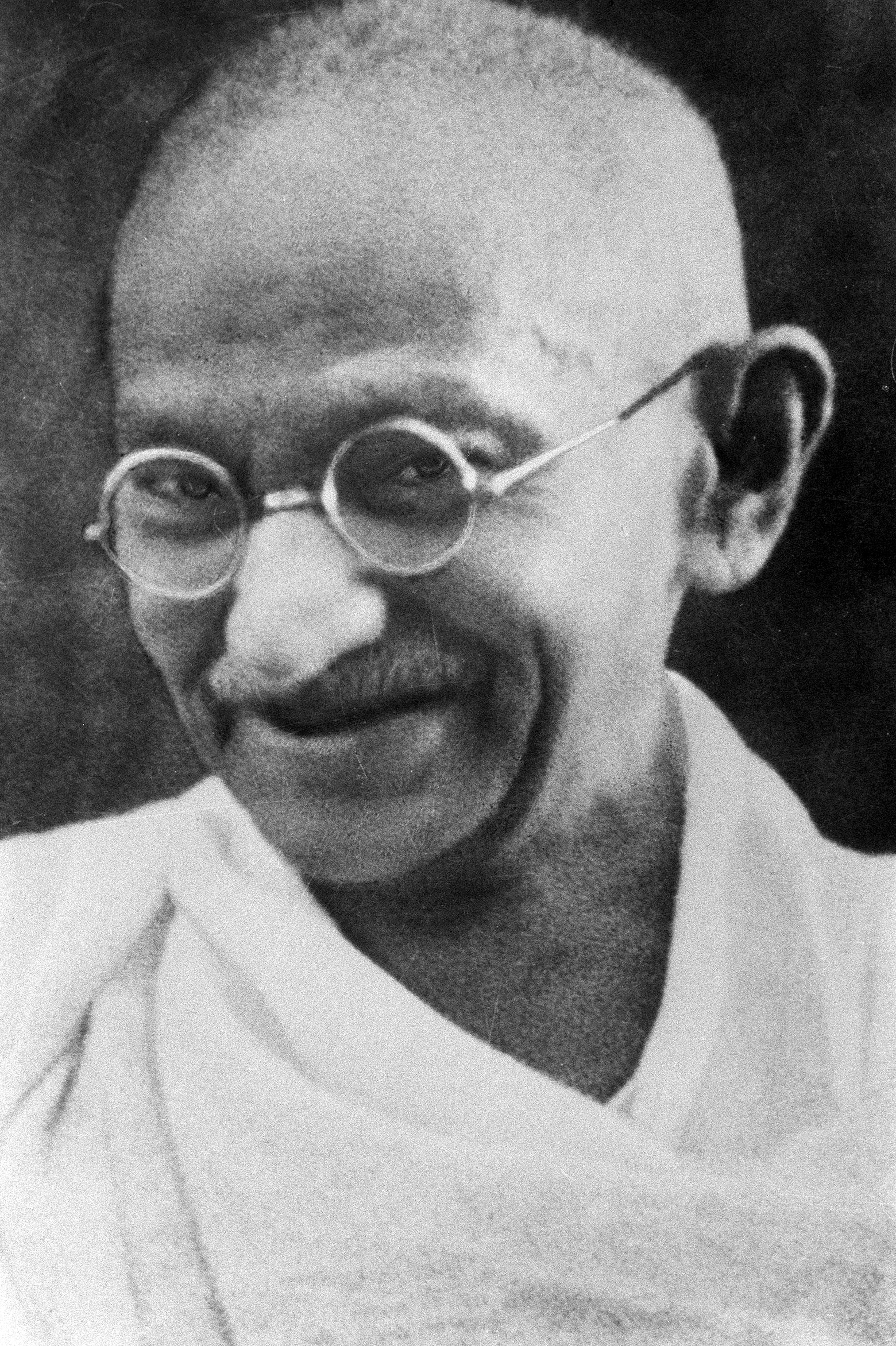
Photo of Gandhi in his 70s, in the 1940s. "Many of the people born in the West since 1940 or so have little idea who Gandhi was."

Chapter Titles (Gandhi as a Political Strategist)
Part One: Gandhi as a Political Strategist
1.	Gandhi's Political Significance
2.	Origins of Gandhi's Use of Nonviolent Struggle: A Review-Essay on Erik Erikson's Gandhi's Truth
3.	Gandhi on the Theory of Voluntary Servitude
4.	Satyagraha and Political Conflict: A Review of Joan V. Bondurant's Conquest of Violence
5.	The Theory of Gandhi's Constructive Program
6.	Gandhi's Evaluation of Indian Nonviolent Action
7.	India's Lesson for the Peace Movement
8.	Gandhi's Defense Policy
9.	Gandhi as a National Defense Strategist
Part Two: Essays on Ethics and Politics
10.	Types of Principled Nonviolence (Note: The six types are "nonresistance, active reconciliation, moral resistance, selective nonviolence, satyagraha, and nonviolent revolution.... There is no strict separation between some of these types.... This classification should be viewed simply as a tool to facilitate understanding and study... which is neither perfect nor final" (GPS 1979, p. 206).) (Note: Sharp identifies two meanings of satyagraha, and Chapter 10 focuses on only one of them. Sharp states that in Chapter 10, "satyagraha is the type of principled nonviolence developed by Mohandas K. Gandhi. This [Chapter 10] discussion is focused exclusively on Gandhi's normative approach to nonviolence. The term satyagraha is also used to indicate his technique of action suitable for use by people not sharing his beliefs. On that focus, see the chapters in this book which discuss satyagraha as a technique of struggle" (GPS 1979, p. 219).)
11.	Ethics and Responsibility in Politics: A Critique of the Present Adequacy of Max Weber's Classification of Ethical Systems (Note: Sharp's "five 'ideal types' of ethical systems determined on the basis of their view of means and ends" (p. 247) are: "(1) Ethic of loyalty to ultimate ends and unconcern with results.... (2) Ethic of deliberate consistency in means and ends.... (3) Ethic of willingness to use the 'necessary' and 'most suitable' means.... (4) Ethic of 'the necessary evil of violence'.... (5) Ethic of loyalty to violence as means and end" (GPS 1979, pp. 247–248).)
12.	Morality, Politics, and Political Technique
13.	Nonviolence: Moral Principle or Political Technique? Clues from Gandhi's Thought and Experience (Note: Sharp notes that "If, as Gandhi believed, the ethical course of action and the practical course of action are ultimately identical, then the 'believer' in the nonviolent ethic must be involved with the practical development of the political technique, and the 'practical politician' can explore the possibility of substituting effective nonviolent means in place of violence in one specific problem area after another.... If, however, this development did not prove practicable, it would suggest that nonviolence is not valid as an universal ethic." (GPS 1979, p. 305).)

Sharp notes that "Gandhi offered his views for consideration by others who should independently evaluate them," asserting that "In many ways, we have already moved beyond Gandhi. Yet, we will be able to do so far more ably if we seek to learn as much as possible [from Gandhi]."

Each of Part One's nine chapters focuses on Gandhi as a political strategist. Chapter 1 seeks to rebut what it asserts are six mistaken views of Gandhi that have "masqueraded as 'realistic' assessments." Two other chapters review and critique books on the origin (ch. 2) and nature (ch. 4) of Gandhi's approach to nonviolence, which he called satyagraha. A chapter on "voluntary servitude" discusses and analyzes Gandhi's view that servitude in hierarchical social and political systems is essentially voluntary, implying that even the worst tyranny can be ended through the withdrawal of submission and cooperation. Another describes Gandhi's theory of the "constructive program... an attempt to build the beginnings of the new social order while the old society still exists." Other chapters address Gandhi's defense policy, his own evaluation of his success with satyagraha, and implications of the Gandhian experience for the whole world.

The four chapters in Part Two address wider ethical and political issues concerning "how people can live in the real world... without violation of their ethical principles." One chapter distinguishes six types of "principled nonviolence," only one of which is Gandhi's satyagraha. Another chapter argues that sociologist Max Weber's influential theoretical dichotomy between an 'ethic of ultimate ends' and an 'ethic of responsibility' is "now inadequate and needs to be replaced." Sharp proposes an alternative five-part typology. In this second part, Gandhi is the direct focus of only the final chapter, which analyzes the relation between nonviolence as a political technique and nonviolence as a moral principle.

Gandhi as a Political Strategist also includes 6 appendices covering topics such as preparing courses on Gandhi, resources for further study, and other scholarship that uses a "technique approach" in studying nonviolence. (Note: Shridharani, Krishnalal Jethalal (1939). War Without Violence. New York: Harcourt, Brace and company. OCLC 768773096. (351 pages). Appendix B of Gandhi as a Political Strategist is adapted from an introduction written by Sharp for a reprint of War Without Violence by the Garland Library of War and Peace. New York: Garland, 1972.) Sharp states that for a "presentation of Gandhi's perceptions of the dynamics of nonviolent struggle in open conflict with a repressive opponent... the reader is referred to... The Politics of Nonviolent Action, Part III."

== Reception ==
Reviews of Gandhi as a Political Strategist (GPS) have appeared in Contemporary Sociology, Journal of Developing Areas, Ethics, Third World Quarterly, and American Journal of Sociology.

In Contemporary Sociology, Rayman stated that "Until this penetrating work by Sharp, there has been no thorough coverage in English of the form and content of Gandhian strategy and political policy." She wrote that

On the empirical dimension, Sharp.... employs case studies of Indian nonviolent campaigns to demonstrate how Gandhi refused to embrace a dogmatic view of truth but rather sought to make nonviolence a vehicle for experimentation in "the search for truth" for all peoples. Thus, as a political tool, nonviolence posits a duty of disloyalty against unjust regimes, and a commitment to courage and activism on the part of each individual.

Among several theoretical contributions,

Sharp's... attempt to pose nonviolent action as synthesis of the opposing Weberian doctrines of "ethic of ultimate ends and the ethics of responsibility" raises serious questions for those who look only to violent revolutions as change catalysts.

Rayman concluded that the major shortcoming of "this sophisticated and imaginative work" was that it "fails to address sufficiently questions of political economy, including class stratification, colonialism, and developing forms of socialism and capitalism within Gandhi's era."

In the Journal of Developing Areas, Nakhre wrote that in its opening chapters, GPS "effectively explodes some widespread myths and misrepresentations about Gandhi which 'have masqueraded as ‘realistic’ assessments'" Indeed, GPS "is a book of very great importance to all serious students of conflict. Its scholarship is meticulous and profound. In a world increasingly prone to violence it challenges the reader to look anew at nonviolence, particularly as practiced by Gandhi, as a viable alternative"

In Ethics, Ostergaard wrote that Sharp makes it clear that "one reason why Gandhi merits attention is that he did directly challenge the means-end framework of thought." He also stated that:

Sharp's purpose is to show, especially to those who have too readily dismissed nonviolence as a pacifist illusion, that there does exist a genuine functional alternative to war, both external and internal. In a world where the Machiavellian principle that the end justifies the means continues to hold sway, Sharp's approach has much to commend it. If people generally are ever to give up the belief that, in the last resort, violence is indispensable in settling... important conflicts... it is more likely to come about by convincing them that nonviolent action is a practical and more effective alternative than by persuading them that violence is morally unjustifiable.

In the Third World Quarterly, Marxist historian V. G. Kiernan wrote that "Marxists in India in recent years have felt compelled to think afresh about Gandhi and his place in Indian history, even if they do not yet have him in clear focus." Gandhi as a Political Strategist is "based on thorough sifting of Gandhi's writings and statements... the author's approach is highly appreciative, but not at all uncritical," and "it is well worth while" that these essays have been brought together. While Sharp is convinced that Gandhian methods can be further developed "so as to become a substitute for war between nations," Gandhi's own suggestions "can only... offer a starting point." But "the positive content of Gandhi's philosophy remains, and this survey does justice to it.... that arbitrary governments can only survive while their subjects are willing to kowtow to them."

In the American Journal of Sociology, Boulding wrote that "No one is better qualified than Sharp to analyze Gandhi as a political strategist and to put his work in the context of 20th-century nonviolent political action in its totality. Had Sharp sat down to do such a review using the tools and concepts he has developed.... we would have had a book of major importance." But the present book fails to offer "a systematic analysis of the evolution of Gandhi's thought over time, although [Sharp] gives tantalizing suggestions for such an analysis." More generally, Boulding viewed the book's reprinted essays as repetitive, stating that they "do not hang together well." She also regarded Sharp as overly simplistic in his characterizations of the western peace movement. To Boulding, the first chapter, reviewing Erikson's Gandhi's Truth, "is one of the best.... It describes the various nonviolent movements active... in Africa... Russia, China, Ireland, England, and India... documenting the largely unrecognized models available to the young Gandhi." Boulding concluded that a "systematic analysis of Gandhi's strategic thinking in the context of 20th-century currents of nationalism and social change movements has still to be written. I, for one, hope Sharp himself will write it."

== Editions ==
The original edition was published in the US in 1979, and another English-language edition was published in India in 1999:

- Sharp, Gene (1979). Gandhi as a political strategist: With essays on ethics and politics. Boston: Porter Sargent. ISBN 0-87558-090-4. ISBN 0-87558-092-0, OCLC 5591944 (357 pages); with introduction by Coretta Scott King.
- Sharp, Gene (1999). Gandhi as a political strategist: With essays on ethics and politics. New Delhi: Gandhi Media Centre. OCLC 52226697.; with introduction by Federico Mayor, then Director-General of UNESCO

== Notes ==
Explanatory notes

Citations
