= Étienne de La Boétie =

French judge, writer and philosopher (1530–1563)

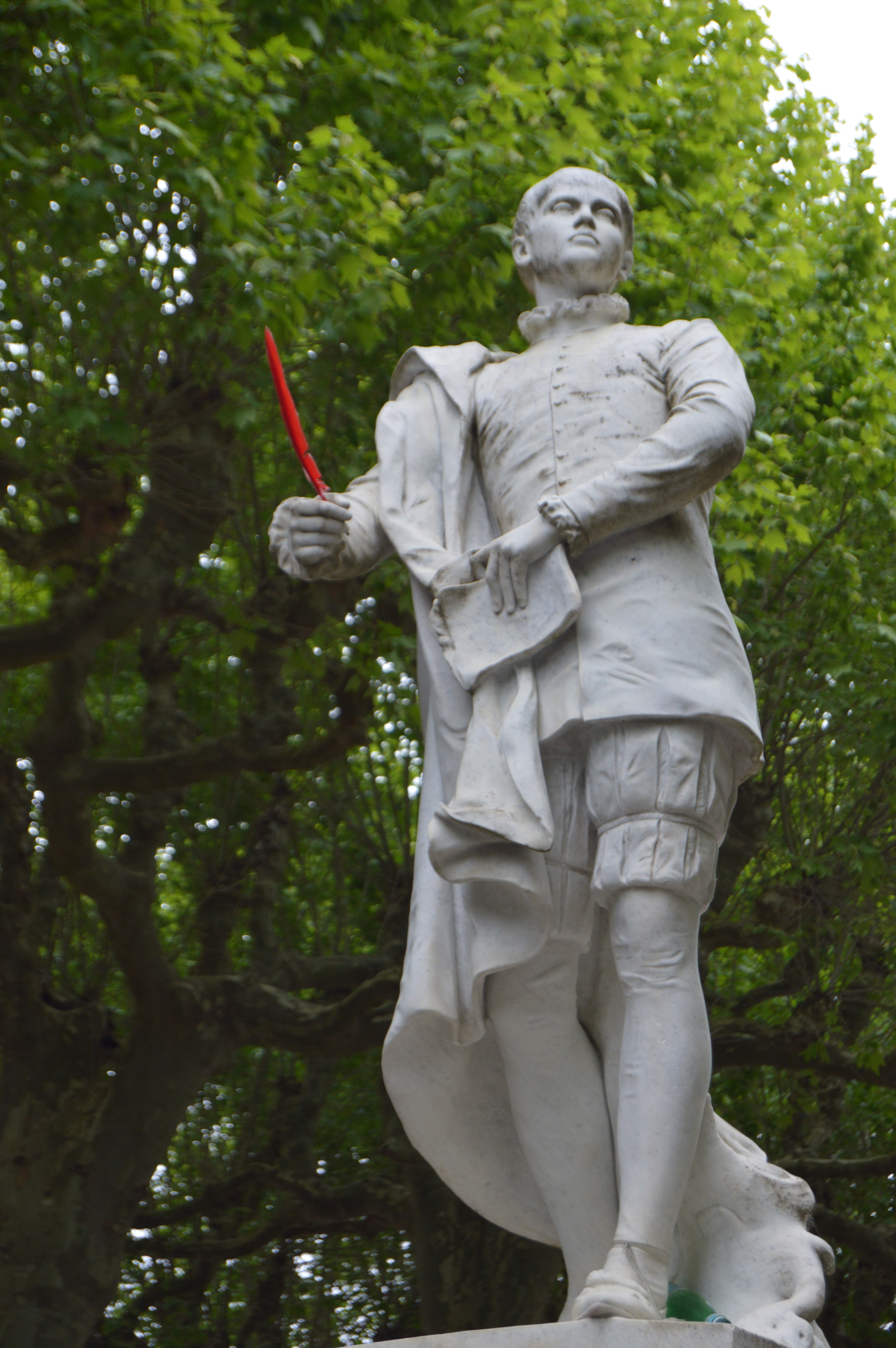
- Born: 1 November 1530; Sarlat-la-Canéda, Périgord, France
- Died: 18 August 1563 (aged 32); Germignan near Bordeaux, France

Education
- Education: College of Guienne; University of Orléans

Philosophical work
- Era: Renaissance philosophy: 16th-century philosophy
- Region: Western philosophy: French philosophy
- School: French Renaissance; Renaissance humanism
- Main interests: Classical studies, legal philosophy, poetry, political philosophy
- Notable ideas: Voluntary servitude

Étienne or Estienne de La Boétie (French: [etjɛn d(ə) la bɔesi] , also [bwati] or [bɔeti]; Occitan: Esteve de La Boetiá; 1 November 1530 – 18 August 1563) was a French magistrate, classicist, writer, poet and political theorist, best remembered for his relationship with essayist Michel de Montaigne. His early political treatise Discourse on Voluntary Servitude was posthumously adopted by the Huguenot movement and is sometimes seen as an early influence on modern anti-statist, utopian and civil disobedience thought.

== Life ==
La Boétie was born in Sarlat, in the Périgord region of southwest France, in 1530 to an aristocratic family. His father was a royal official of the Périgord region and his mother was the sister of the president of the Bordeaux Parliament (assembly of lawyers). Orphaned at an early age, he was brought up by his uncle and namesake, the curate of Bouilbonnas, and received his law degree from the University of Orléans in 1553. His great and precocious ability earned La Boétie a royal appointment to the Bordeaux Parliament the following year, despite his being under the minimum age. There he pursued a distinguished career as judge and diplomatic negotiator until his untimely death from illness in 1563 at the age of thirty-two. La Boétie was also a distinguished poet and humanist, translating Xenophon and Plutarch, and being closely connected with the leading young Pleiade group of poets, including Pierre de Ronsard, Jean Daurat and Jean-Antoine de Baïf.

La Boétie was favorable to the conciliation of Catholicism and Protestantism; "warned of the dangerous and divisive consequences of permitting two religions, which could lead to two opposed states in the same country. The most he would have allowed the Protestants was the right to worship in private, and he pointed out their own intolerance of Catholics. His policy for religious peace was one of conciliation and concord through reforms in the church that would eventually persuade the Protestants to reunite with Catholicism". He served with Montaigne in the Bordeaux parlement and is immortalized in Montaigne's essay on friendship. Some historians have questioned whether the two were lovers or not, but each played influential roles in each other's lives regardless.

== Writings ==
La Boétie's writings include a few sonnets, translations from the classics and an essay attacking monarchy and tyranny in general, Discours de la servitude volontaire ou le Contr'un (Discourse on Voluntary Servitude, or the Anti-Dictator). The essay asserts that tyrants have power because the people give it to them. Liberty has been abandoned once by society, which afterward stayed corrupted and prefers the slavery of the courtesan to the freedom of one who refuses to dominate as he refuses to obey. Thus, La Boétie linked obedience and domination, a relationship which would be later theorised by latter anarchist thinkers. By advocating a solution of simply refusing to support the tyrant, he became one of the earliest advocates of civil disobedience and nonviolent resistance. Murray N. Rothbard summarizes La Boétie's political philosophy as follows:

To him, the great mystery of politics was obedience to rulers. Why in the world do people agree to be looted and otherwise oppressed by government overlords? It is not just fear, Boetie explains in the Discourse on Voluntary Servitude, for our consent is required. And that consent can be non-violently withdrawn.

It was once thought following Montaigne's claims that La Boétie wrote the essay in 1549 at the age of eighteen, but recent authorities argue that it is "likely that the Discourse was written in 1552 or 1553, at the age of twenty-two, while La Boétie was at the university". Some Montaigne scholars have argued that the essay was in fact the work of Montaigne himself. The essay was circulated privately and not published until 1576 after La Boétie's death. He died in Germignan near Bordeaux in 1563. La Boétie's days are described in a long letter from Montaigne to his own father.

== Influence ==
In the 20th century, many European anarchists began to cite La Boétie as an influence, including Gustav Landauer, Bart de Ligt and Simone Weil. Autonomist Marxist thinker John Holloway also cites him in his book Crack Capitalism in order to explain his idea of "breaking with capitalism". Gene Sharp, the leading theorist of nonviolent struggle, cites his work frequently in both The Politics of Nonviolent Action and From Dictatorship to Democracy.

== Gallery ==
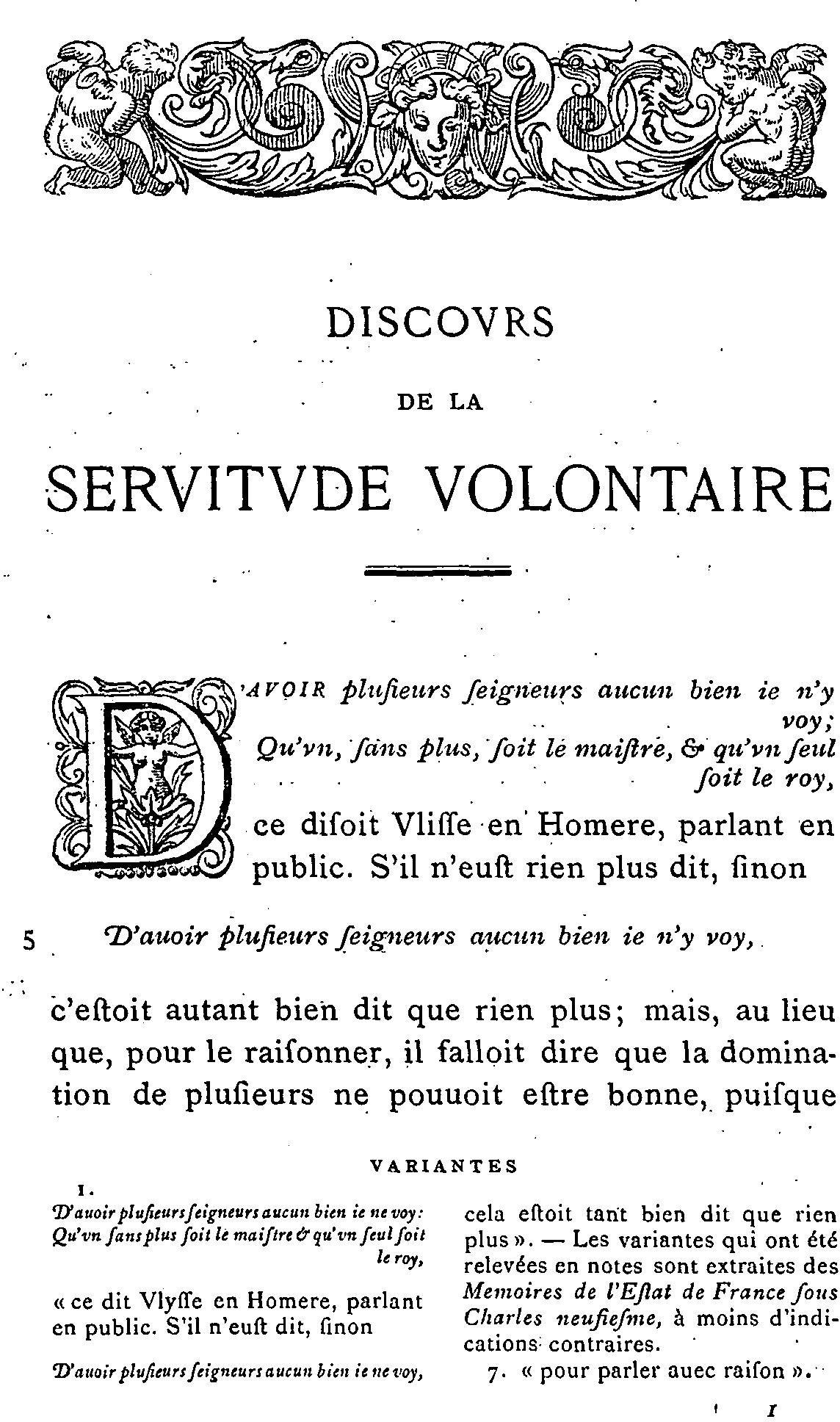
Discours de la servitude volontaire

Œuvres complètes (Complete Works), 1892

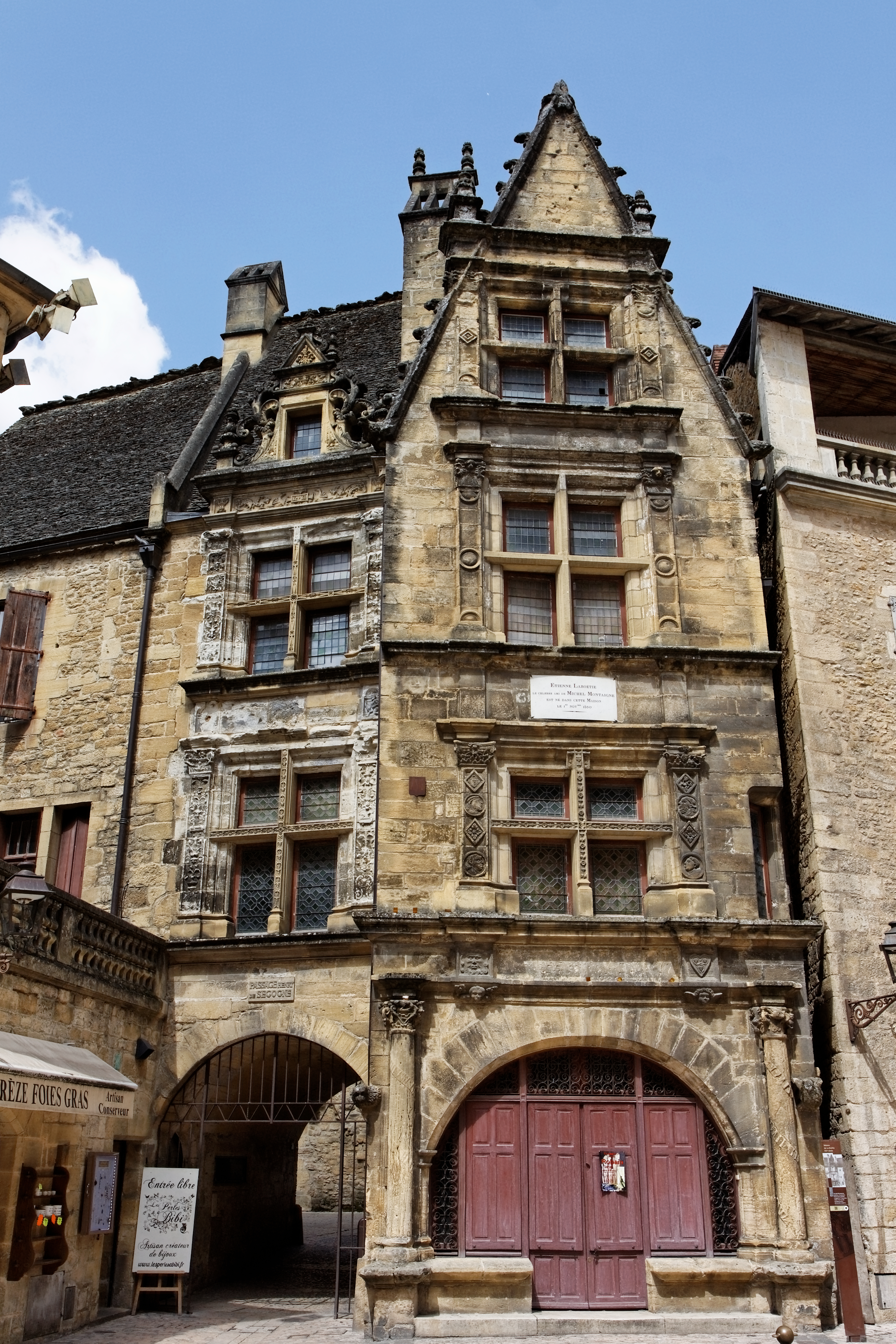
La Boétie's home at Sarlat

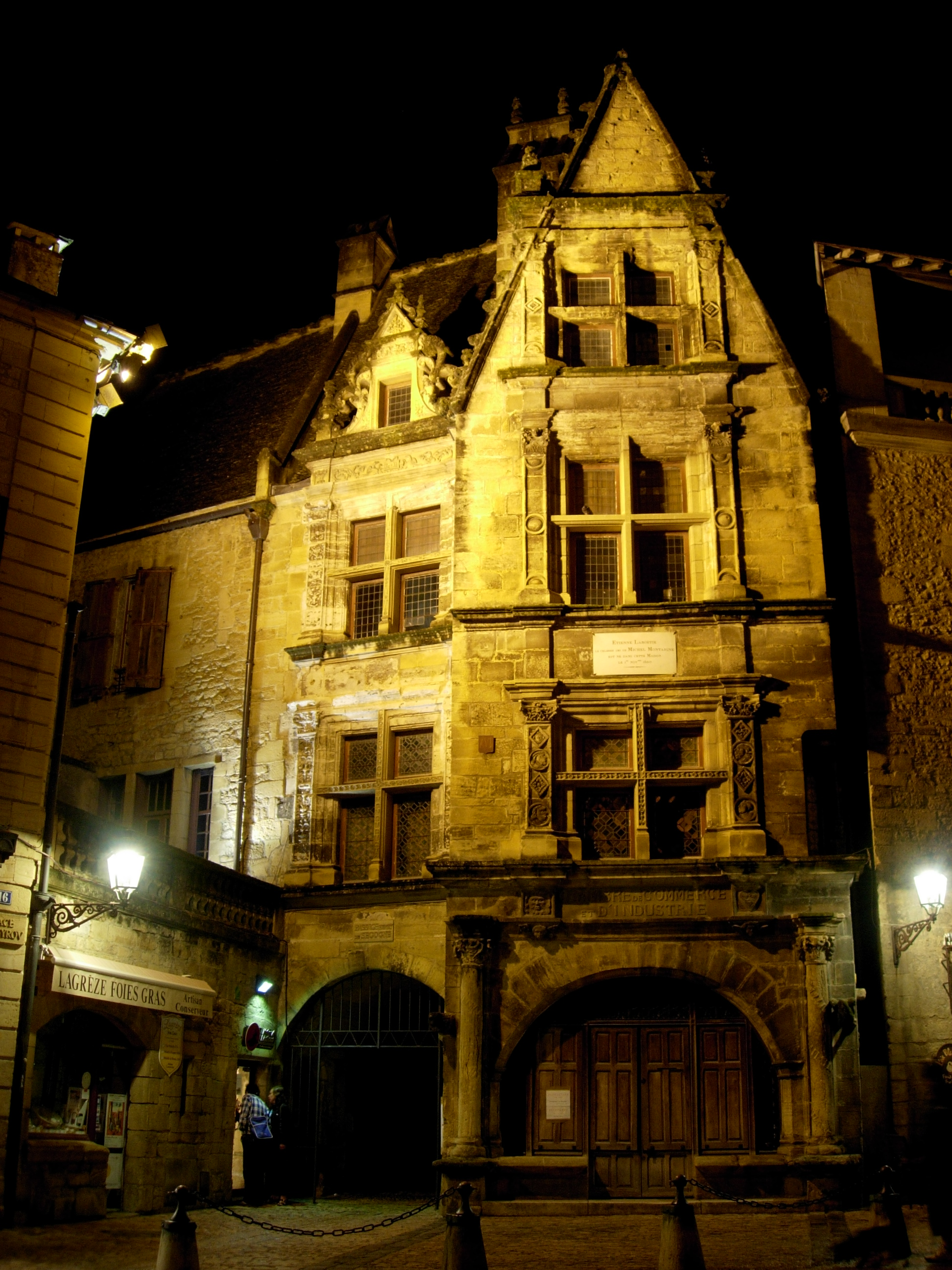
Birthplace of La Boétie

== Bibliography ==
- Œuvres complètes, Editions William Blake & Co., 1991. ISBN 2905810602.
- Discours de la servitude volontaire, Editions Mille et une nuits, 1997. ISBN 2910233944.
- Discours de la servitude volontaire, Editions Flammarion, 1993. ISBN 2080703943.
- The Politics of Obedience: The Discourse of Voluntary Servitude, translated by Harry Kurz and with an introduction by Murray Rothbard, Montrèal/New York/London: Black Rose Books, 1997. ISBN 1551640899.
- The Politics of Obedience: The Discourse of Voluntary Servitude, translated by Harry Kurz and with an introduction by Murray Rothbard, Free Life Editions, 1975. ISBN 091415611X.
