= Resistance, Politics, and the American Struggle for Independence, 1765–1775 =

American history book

- Author: Walter H. Conser, Jr., Ronald M. McCarthy, David J. Toscano, & Gene Sharp (Eds.)
- Language: English
- Genre: History
- Publisher: Lynne Rienner
- Publication date: 1986
- Pages: 592
- ISBN: 0-931477-75-1
- OCLC: 13008252

Resistance, Politics, and the American Struggle for Independence, 1765–1775 is a book that examines the role of nonviolent struggle in the period before the American Revolution. Edited by Walter H. Conser, Jr., Ronald M. McCarthy, David J. Toscano and Gene Sharp, the book was published in the United States in 1986. It argues that the Stamp Act resistance and other campaigns from 1765 to 1775 were fundamental for shaping the outcome of the struggle for American independence, and were not merely a "prelude" to armed conflict.

Nonviolent resistance was at the heart of these campaigns, but key features of this nonviolence have been largely neglected by historians. To fill this perceived gap, the book provides a sustained narrative of the 1765–1775 resistance, followed by a set of interpretive essays aimed to provoke further discussion and inquiry. Six hypothetical explanations are offered for why the colonists shifted to military struggle, despite the considerable success of nonviolent struggle. Reviews have appeared in several historical and legal journals.

== Origins ==
Resistance, Politics, and the American Struggle for Independence, 1765–1775 (RPASI), claims that most historians of colonial America have treated the events of 1765–1775 as merely a "prelude" to the US Revolutionary War. Events such as the resistance to the Stamp Act and Townshend Acts are typically treated as "not significant in themselves." This book, however

questions this assumption and suggests that these forms of resistance—primarily nonviolent ones—pursued by the American colonists from 1765 to 1775 were of fundamental importance themselves for the outcome of the struggle for independence, shaping the growth of new political, economic, and social institutions which could sustain truly independent self-government.

In their preface, the editors state that their interest in the historical period covered in RPASI began in the 1970s, when they were studying nonviolent action as a pragmatic tool of civilian struggle. In their work, they

discovered a large number of events in American colonial history - boycotts, nonimportation, noncooperation, and protest demonstrations of many kinds - all of which could be described as examples of nonviolent action [and] the incidence and success... seemed so significant that we were surprised that the subject had received so little attention. Although many scholars have described the decade in great detail, the richness and importance of the nonviolent activity was lost because of their emphasis on a seemingly inevitable rush toward war.

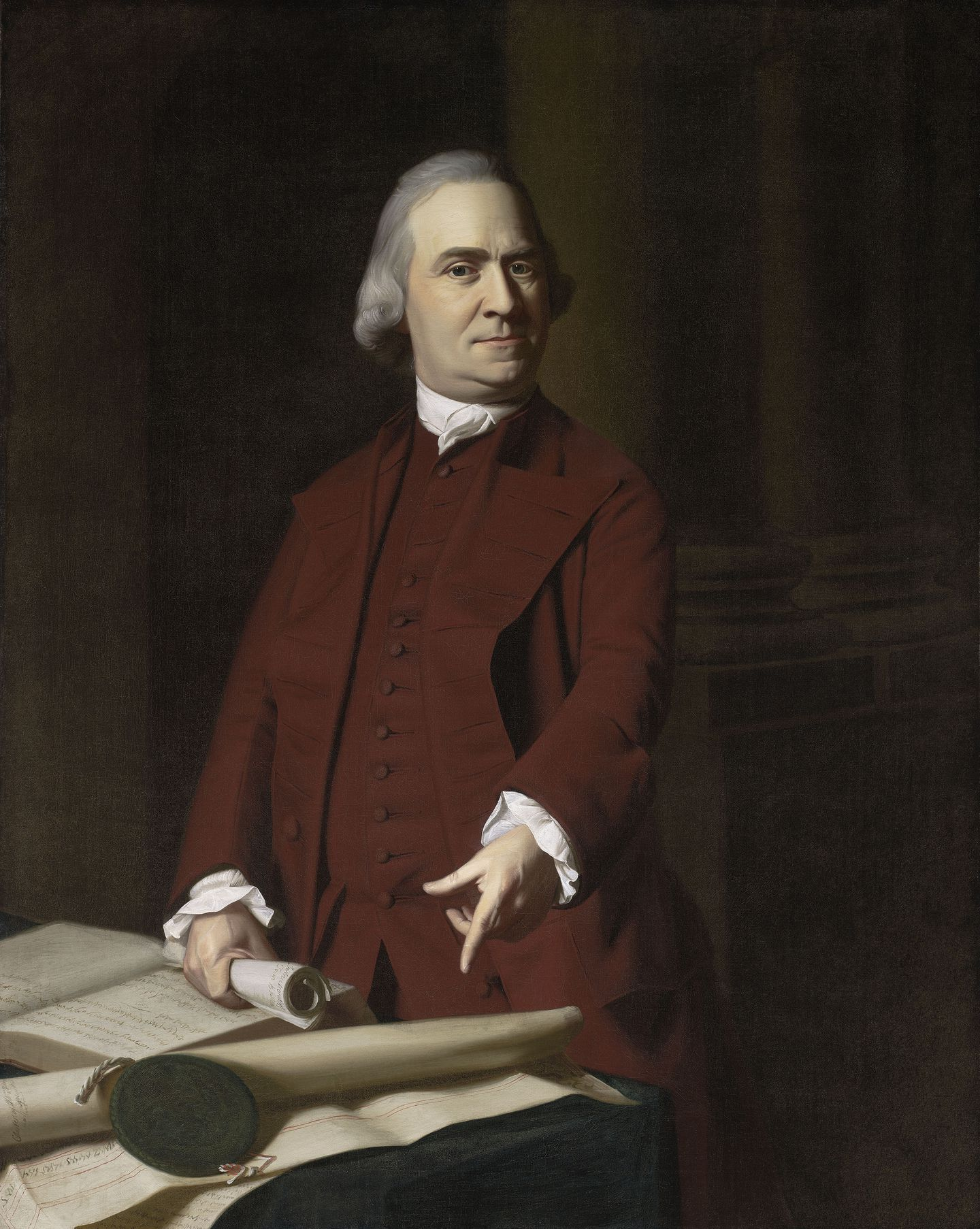
"I beseech you... to avoid Blood and Tumult.... Nothing can ruin us but our Violence." —Samuel Adams, 1774.

Indeed, "researchers often look throughout the length of a period for evidence of what they regard as its inevitable outcome... for example... for the roots of war.... In the process, they... may ignore the contributions of alternative means to the outcome." An example is that "Samuel Adams, whom many... associate with the tactics of violence, issued numerous statements prior to Lexington and Concord opposing the use of armed force" (see quote at left).

The book project was originally conceived due to recognition by co-editor Gene Sharp, a leading scholar of nonviolent struggle, that the American colonists had "employed the techniques of nonviolent resistance" in their struggle against Great Britain.

The book was sponsored by Harvard University's Center for International Affairs, and by the Albert Einstein Institution, both led by Sharp. The editors claim that the book "if read carefully, is likely to spark scholarly controversy and argument," and that they "believe that such debate can clarify the issues... and enhance the understanding of this critical decade in our history."

== Topics covered ==
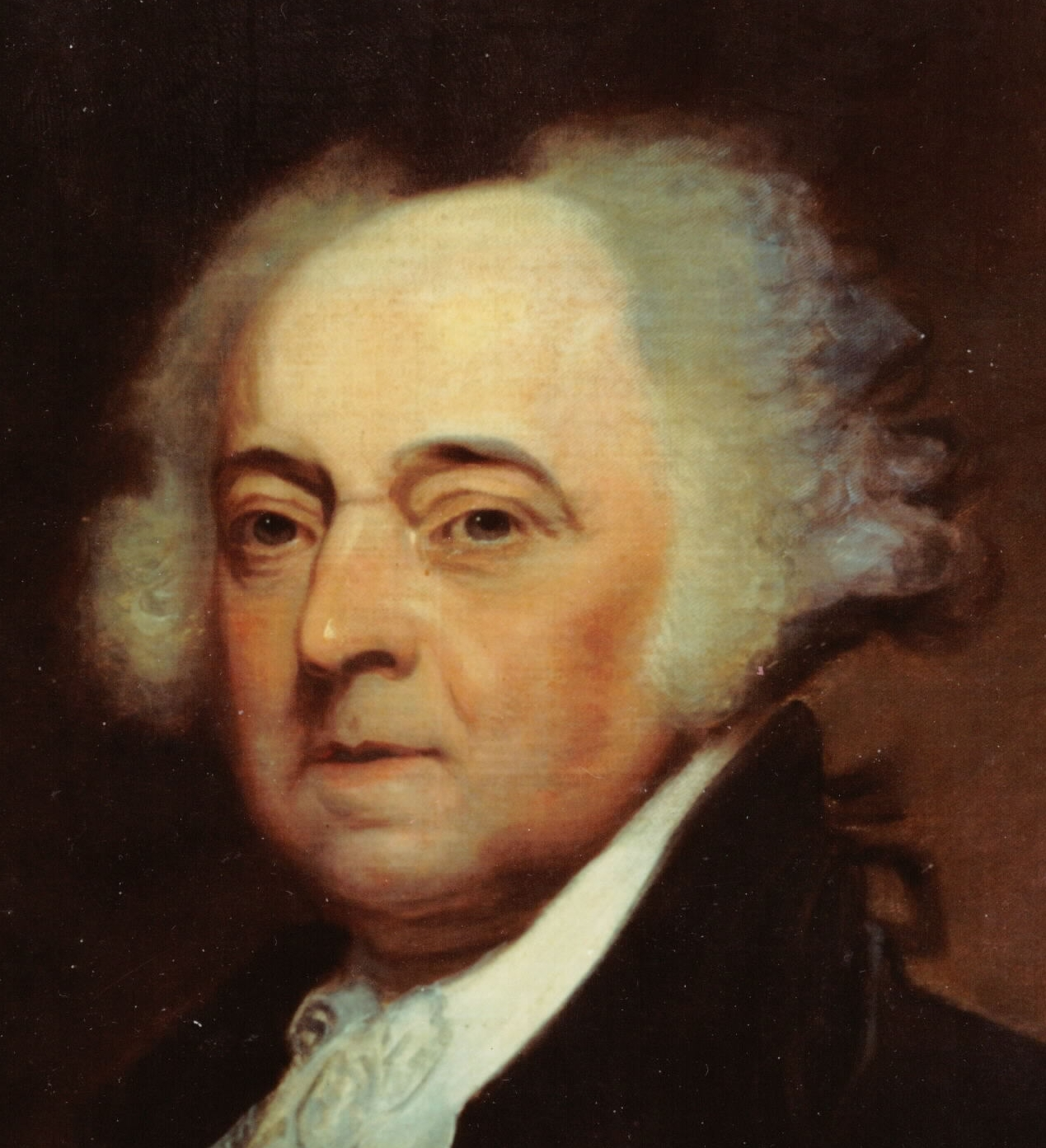
John Adams (US President, 1797–1801)

"A history of military operations from April 19, 1775 to the 3d of September, 1783, is not a history of the American Revolution.... The revolution was in the minds and hearts of the people, and in the union of the colonies; both of which were substantially effected before hostilities commenced."
—John Adams, 1815.

List of RPASI Chapters

Chapter Title
Author(s)
Part 1: A Decade of Struggle, 1765–1775
1.
The American Independence Movement, 1765–1775: A Decade of Nonviolent Struggles
Walter H. Conser, Jr., Ronald M. McCarthy, & David J. Toscano
2.
The Stamp Act Resistance
Walter H. Conser, Jr.
3.
The First Rockingham Ministry and the Repeal of the Stamp Act
Paul Langford
Introduction to Chapter 4
Conser & McCarthy
4.
Nonconsumption and Nonimportation... Against the Townshend Acts
Leslie J. Thomas
5.
British Response to American Reactions
Ian R. Christie
Introduction to Chapter 6
David J. Toscano
6.
The Continental Association: Economic Resistance
David L. Ammerman
7.
The British Business Community and... Nonimportation
Paul Langford
8.
The British Ministers
Ian R. Christie
Part II: The Impact of the Struggle
9.
The Impact of Commercial Resistance
Conser & McCarthy
10.
Religion and... Resistance
Walter H. Conser, Jr.
11.
English Radicals and American Resistance
C. C. Bonwick
12.
A Shift in Strategy: The Organization of Military Struggle
Toscano, McCarthy, & Conser
13.
British Attitudes to the American Revolution
J. H. Plumb
14.
Parallel Government in America
Ronald M. McCarthy
‍Hypothethcal Reasons for Shift to Military Strategy
H1
Changes within the movement and "the last resource"
H2
Inadequacy of the nonviolent technique
H3
A violent party
H4
A fait accompli
H5
The military as a symbol of sovereignty
H6
Misunderstanding of the nonviolent technique

Resistance, Politics, and the American Struggle for Independence, 1765-1775 contains 14 chapters that are intended to "relate integrally to one another and provide a complete narrative of the period [of 1765-1775]." These chapters are listed in the table at right.

After the first introductory chapter, the next 7 chapters contain the book's "narrative section," which focuses on describing the struggles from 1765 to 1775 chronologically, using the "terminology of the day," and only "rarely [making] use of the term 'nonviolent action.'" The book's final 6 chapters are analytical, offering interpretations of the decade's events. These chapters address questions raised in the narrative section, and also suggest areas for future research.

Basic concepts are introduced in Chapter 1, which gives an overview of the three main resistance campaigns of 1765 to 1775 opposing the Stamp Act of 1765, the Townsend Acts of 1767, and the Coercive Acts of 1774. Nonviolent action is described as a technique that operates to bring about change through serving to "manipulate the shared social, cultural, economic and political system in which the opposing parties engage in conflict." Citing Sharp's Politics of Nonviolent Action, they divide methods of nonviolent action into the three categories of nonviolent protest and persuasion, noncooperation, and nonviolent intervention. Nonviolent action succeeds by "rendering the opponent's sources of power unusable, unworkable, and uncontrollable," through mechanisms that may include conversion, accommodation, or "nonviolent coercion [that] occurs when an opponent is forced against his or her will to grant the actionists' demands."

The most dramatic use of nonviolent intervention on the part of the colonists is found in their creation of new governmental bodies such as the provincial congresses and conventions. By receiving overwhelming support from the populace, these extralegal bodies and their local counterparts effectively replaced the Crown's established government in the colonies.

The editors argue (Ch. 1) that previous scholarship has overlooked "the degree to which the colonists used a kind of 'weapons system' that operated without force of arms or violence in trying to compel the British government to change its policies." Viewed from this angle, commercial resistance (nonimportation) is analyzed closely (Ch. 9). It is apparent that the colonists' skill in applying the methods of nonviolent struggle "improved greatly over the decade," as did the "intellectual underpinnings" of their resistance (Chs. 10, 11).

Still, at the close of the decade, the nonviolent movement was abandoned in favor of military resistance, and the editors discuss six alternative hypothetical explanations for why this shift occurred (Ch. 12; see table at right). The hypothetical explanations are not meant as mutually exclusive, but as "avenues for fruitful inquiry." Indeed,

The editors believe that definitive conclusions are premature at this time and await the future efforts of skillful scholars sensitive to the issues raised in this volume. What actually went on in the "minds and hearts" of the colonists... will always be difficult to assess [but] the historical record is present for serious examination.

John Adams (quoted above right), who lived through and helped lead the independence struggle, claimed that "The revolution was... substantially effected before hostilities commenced." McCarthy (Ch. 14) argues that "independence in many of the colonies had essentially been achieved prior to the commencement of military hostilities at Lexington and Concord."

Appendices: Historical Documents
A.	Examination of Benjamin Franklin on the Stamp Act, 12-–13 February 1766
B.	Letter Three of John Dickinson's Letters from a Farmer in Pennsylvania
C.	Excerpt from the Boston Newsletter, 6 July 1769
D.	Virginia Association, August 1774
E.	Suffolk Resolves, 14 September 1774
F.	Continental Association, October 1774
G.	Letters and Diary Extracts of Josiah Quincy, Jr., 1774–1775

The book concludes with 7 appendices that reproduce key historical materials (see table below right), as well as a 23-page index.

== Reviews and influence ==
Reviews have appeared in the Journal of Southern History the Journal of American History, and the Law and History Review.

In the Journal of Southern History, Mills wrote of RPASI that "Although the work covers familiar ground, the approach is fresh and the treatment is stimulating. The interpretative theme is certain to provoke debate." He added that "The criticisms one might make of this study are cosmetic (e.g., the considerable variations in the sizes of several chapters) rather than substantive."

In the Journal of American History, Ireland commended the historical essays as shedding light on important aspects of the American Revolution, stating that "having them collected together in one place is useful." He was critical of most chapters by the editors as "much less valuable," and came away feeling "that I have missed the point, or that there is no point here of any great moment for a historian."

In Law and History Review, Roeber wrote that RPASI "includes stimulating essays by ten authors, four British," and

The British contributors... present an image of British domestic tactics of resistance, and ministerial policy on the use of the military that is quite striking.... an impressive documentation of what one might call an eighteenth-century British ethic of restraint, both on the part of aggrieved complainants, and authorities faced with fractious subjects.

But in the American colonial frontier, "military tactics were acknowledged by all to be more vicious than those employed in European conflicts." Thus, for Roeber, "One comes away from this rich and stimulating series of essays with the disturbing sense that Americans had, at the very time of the Republic's founding, been swept up on a tide of violent resistance that fit with their colonial frontier experience."

Mills wrote that "One can hope that the challenge to conduct more research into the period from 1774 to 1775 and the shift from nonviolent to violent action will be heeded."

== See also ==
- Nonviolent revolution
