= Transarmament =

Replacement of armed forces with infrastructure to support nonviolent resistance

Transarmament (closely related to civilian-based defense) is the partial or total replacement of armed forces with the physical and social infrastructure to support nonviolent resistance. Gene Sharp defined transarmament as "the process of changeover from a military-based defense policy to a civilian-based defense policy." Unlike disarmament, "transarmament always involves the replacement of one means to provide defense with another" instead of the "simple reduction or abandonment of military capacity."

== Civilian defense ==
The term "transarmament" appears to have been introduced in 1937 in a pamphlet by Kenneth Boulding. It appears not to have been used again until the 1960s.

According to Adam Roberts,

At least four possible stages [of transarmament] can be envisaged:
1. Research and investigation into civilian defence, in order to judge its workability, relate it to a specific country's defence problems, and develop strategic and tactical concepts so that the proposal can be presented in concrete and practical terms.
2. General public education in non-violent action and civilian defence; concentrated training of key groups and individuals; organizational preparations.
3. Application of civilian defence in specific areas without complete abandonment of military defence policy.
4. Public commitment to use civilian defence in resisting all threats formerly dealt with by military methods. Completion of process of transarment. (p. 338)

== Offensive to defensive ==
"Transarmament" has later been used—for example, by Johan Galtung—as a technical term to describe a shift in military strategy. Galtung distinguishes between offensive and defense armaments and suggests transitioning to a defensive system of national defense. His use of the term does not imply nonviolence. Galtung advocates precise weapons with limited range and destructive effects.

== See also ==
- Making Europe Unconquerable: The Potential of Civilian-Based Deterrence and Defence

(1985 book by Gene Sharp)
