= Gene Sharp =

American political scientist (1928–2018)

- Born: January 21, 1928; North Baltimore, Ohio, U.S.
- Died: January 28, 2018 (aged 90); Boston, Massachusetts, U.S.
- Education: Ohio State University (BA, MA); University of Oxford (DPhil)
- Known for: Theory of nonviolent resistance
- Awards: Right Livelihood Award
- Scientific career
- Fields: Political science, civil resistance, nonviolent revolution
- Workplaces: University of Massachusetts Dartmouth, Harvard University, Albert Einstein Institution

Gene Sharp (January 21, 1928 – January 28, 2018) was an American political scientist. He was the founder of the Albert Einstein Institution, a non-profit organization dedicated to advancing the study of nonviolent action, and professor of political science at the University of Massachusetts Dartmouth. He was known for his extensive writings on nonviolent struggle, which have influenced numerous anti-government resistance movements around the world.

Sharp received the 2008 Peace Abbey Courage of Conscience Award for his lifelong commitment to the defense of freedom, democracy, and the reduction of political violence through scholarly analysis of the power of nonviolent action. Unofficial sources have claimed that Sharp was nominated for the Nobel Peace Prize in 2015, and had previously been nominated three times, in 2009, 2012 and 2013. Sharp was widely considered the favorite for the 2012 award. In 2011, he was awarded the El-Hibri Peace Education Prize. In 2012, he was a recipient of the Right Livelihood Award for "developing and articulating the core principles and strategies of nonviolent resistance and supporting their practical implementation in conflict areas around the world".

== Biography ==
Sharp was born in North Baltimore, Ohio, the son of an itinerant Protestant minister. He received a Bachelor of Arts in Social Sciences in 1949 from Ohio State University, where he also received his Master of Arts in Sociology in 1951. In 1953–54, Sharp served nine months of a two-year sentence based on his conviction for refusing conscription during the Korean War. He discussed his decision to go to prison for his beliefs in letters to Albert Einstein, who wrote a foreword to his first book on Gandhi. He worked as factory laborer, guide to a blind social worker, and secretary to A. J. Muste, America's leading pacifist. Between 1955 and 1958, he was Assistant Editor of Peace News (London), the weekly pacifist newspaper from where he helped organize the 1958 Aldermaston March. The next two years he studied and researched in Oslo with Professor Arne Næss, who together with Johan Galtung drew extensively from Mohandas Gandhi's writings in developing the Satyagraha Norms. In 1968, he received a Doctor of Philosophy in political theory from Oxford University. Funding for Sharp's research at this time came from the DARPA project of the US Department of Defense.

Sharp was appointed a professor of political science at the University of Massachusetts Dartmouth in 1972. He held research appointments at Harvard University's Center for International Affairs from 1965. In 1983 he founded Harvard's Program on Nonviolent Sanctions in Conflict and Defense (PNS), which "continued in the spirit of its founder." In 1994, PNS was merged with another Harvard organization called Cultural Survival to form the Program on Nonviolent Sanctions and Cultural Survival, which itself later closed in 2005. In 1983 Sharp also founded the Albert Einstein Institution, a non-profit organization devoted to studies and promotion of the use of nonviolent action in conflicts worldwide. In 2004, the Albert Einstein Institution lost much of its funding (with income dropping from more than $1m a year to as little as $160,000), and from then on was run out of Sharp's home in East Boston, near Logan Airport.

In 2012, he received the Zambrano Foundation Distinguished Lifetime Democracy Award.

Sharp died on January 28, 2018, at home in Boston, having just turned 90.

== Theory of nonviolent resistance ==
Gene Sharp described the sources of his ideas as in-depth studies of Mohandas K. Gandhi, A. J. Muste, Henry David Thoreau to a minor degree, and other sources footnoted in his 1973 book The Politics of Nonviolent Action, which was based on his 1968 PhD thesis. In the book, he provides a pragmatic political analysis of nonviolent action as a method for applying power in a conflict. The second volume of the book includes 198 methods of nonviolent action. The list has been regularly used by activists and been expanded on in reports for the International Center of Nonviolent Conflict to include digital and other tactics.

Sharp's key theme is that power is not monolithic; that is, it does not derive from some intrinsic quality of those who are in power. For Sharp, political power, the power of any state – regardless of its particular structural organization – ultimately derives from the subjects of the state. His fundamental belief is that any power structure relies upon the subjects' obedience to the orders of the ruler(s). If subjects do not obey, rulers have no power.

In Sharp's view, all effective power structures have systems by which they encourage or extract obedience from their subjects. States have particularly complex systems for keeping subjects obedient. These systems include specific institutions (police, courts, regulatory bodies, etc.), but may also involve cultural dimensions that inspire obedience by implying that power is monolithic (the god cult of the Egyptian pharaohs, the dignity of the office of the president, moral or ethical norms and taboos, etc.). Through these systems, subjects are presented with a system of sanctions (imprisonment, fines, ostracism) and rewards (titles, wealth, fame) which influence the extent of their obedience.

Sharp identifies this hidden structure as providing a window of opportunity for a population to cause significant change in a state. Sharp cites the insight of Étienne de La Boétie (1530–1563) that if the subjects of a particular state recognize that they are the source of the state's power, they can refuse their obedience and their leader(s) will be left without power.

Sharp published Waging Nonviolent Struggle: 20th Century Practice and 21st Century Potential in 2005. It builds on his earlier written works and documents case studies where nonviolent action has been applied, presents the lessons learned from those applications, and contains information on planning nonviolent struggle to make it more effective.

"How to Start a Revolution", a feature documentary by the Scottish director Ruaridh Arrow about the global influence of Gene Sharp's work, was released in September 2011. The film won "Best Documentary" and the "Mass Impact Award" at the Boston Film Festival in September 2011. The European premiere was held at London's Raindance Film Festival on October 2, 2011, where it also won Best Documentary. A biography of Gene Sharp by Ruaridh Arrow based on the documentary was released in 2020.

== Influence on struggles worldwide ==
Sharp has been called both the "Machiavelli of nonviolence" and the "Clausewitz of nonviolent warfare." It is claimed by some that Sharp's scholarship has influenced resistance organizations around the world. His works remain the ideological underpinning of the work for the Serbian-based nonviolent conflict training group the Centre for Applied Nonviolent Action and Strategies which helped to train the key activists in the protest movement that toppled President Mubarak of Egypt, and many other earlier youth movements in the Eastern European color revolutions.

Sharp's 1993 handbook From Dictatorship to Democracy was first published in Burma, fourth edition in 2010. It has since been translated into at least 31 other languages. It has served as a basis for the campaigns of Serbia's Otpor! (who were also directly trained by the Albert Einstein Institution), Georgia's Kmara, Kyrgyzstan's KelKel and Belarus' Zubr. PORA's Oleh Kyriyenko said in a 2004 interview with Radio Netherlands,

"The bible of Pora has been the book of Gene Sharp, also used by Otpor!, it's called: From Dictatorship to Democracy. Pora activists have translated it by themselves. We have written to Mr Sharp and to the Albert Einstein Institute in the United States, and he became very sympathetic towards our initiative, and the Institution provided funding to print over 12,000 copies of this book for free."

Sharp's writings on "Civilian-based defense" were used by the Lithuanian, Latvian, and Estonian governments during their separation from the Soviet Union in 1991. Lithuanian Defence Minister Audrius Butkevičius declared at the time, "I would rather have this book than the nuclear bomb".

The Iranian government charged protesters against alleged fraud in the 2009 elections with following Gene Sharp's tactics. The Tehran Times reported: "According to the indictment, a number of the accused confessed that the post-election unrest was preplanned and the plan was following the timetable of the velvet revolution to the extent that over 100 stages of the 198 steps of Gene Sharp were implemented in the foiled velvet revolution."

Former members of the IRA are reported to be studying his work.

Sharp and his work have been profiled in numerous media; however, some have claimed Sharp's influence has been exaggerated by Westerners looking for a Lawrence of Arabia figure.

=== Influence in Egypt ===
Coverage of Gene Sharp's influence in the Egyptian revolution produced a backlash from some Egyptian bloggers. One, journalist Hossam el-Hamalawy, stated that "Not only was Mubarak's foreign policy hated and despised by the Egyptian people, but parallels were always drawn between the situation of the Egyptian people and their Palestinian brothers and sisters. The latter have been the major source of inspiration, not Gene Sharp, whose name I first heard in my life only in February after we toppled Mubarak already and whom the clueless NYT moronically gives credit for our uprising." Another Egyptian writer and activist, Karim Alrawi, argued that Gene Sharp's writings are more about regime change than revolution. He defines the latter as having an ethical as well as a material dimension that Sharp deliberately avoids engaging with, and credits local circumstances and the spark provided by the Tunisian revolution for the Egyptian success.

However, evidence and testimony from four different activist groups working in Egypt at the time of the revolution contradict these claims. Dalia Ziada, an Egyptian blogger and activist, said that activists translated excerpts of Sharp's work into Arabic, and that his message of "attacking weaknesses of dictators" stuck with them. Ahmed Maher, a leader of the April 6 democracy group, also stated in the How to Start a Revolution documentary, "Gene Sharp's books had a huge impact" among other influences. The Associated Press reported as early as September 2010 more than four months before the revolution that Gene Sharp's work was being used by activists in Egypt close to political leader Mohamed ElBaradei. Finally The New York Times reported that Sharp's book From Dictatorship to Democracy had been posted by the Muslim Brotherhood on its website during the 2011 Egyptian revolution.

== Criticism ==
According to Stuart Bramhall in Daily Censored, in 2005 Gene Sharp was accused by Thierry Meyssan in VoltaireNet of having strong links with a variety of US institutions including the Central Intelligence Agency, The Pentagon, International Republican Institute, RAND Corporation, and the National Endowment for Democracy.

There has been debate around Sharp's works influencing the Arab Spring, and a leaked US embassy cable mentioned Syrian dissidents using his work to train non-violent protestors, but As'ad AbuKhalil rejected such claims.

Sharp consistently denied these claims and, after a period of sustained attacks in June 2008, notable left wing writers Noam Chomsky and Howard Zinn, among others, defended Sharp in a letter which was circulated by US and internationally based scholars and activists, including the statement,

Rather than being a tool of imperialism, Dr. Sharp's research and writings have inspired generations of progressive peace, labor, feminist, human rights, environmental, and social justice activists in the United States and around the world.

The Albert Einstein Institution has never received any money from any government or government-funded entity. Nor does Dr. Sharp or the Albert Einstein Institution collaborate with the CIA, the NED, or any U.S. government or government-funded agencies; nor has Dr. Sharp or the Albert Einstein Institution ever provided financial or logistical support to any opposition groups in any country; nor has Dr. Sharp or the Albert Einstein Institution ever taken sides in political conflicts or engaged in strategic planning with any group.

The Albert Einstein Institution operates with a very minimal budget out of Dr. Sharp's home with a staff consisting of two people – Dr. Sharp and a young administrator – and is quite incapable of carrying out the foreign intrigues of which it has been falsely accused.

More recently Sharp has been criticised by George Ciccariello-Maher and Michael A. Lebowitz, the latter describing his activities in Venezuela as "marketing regime change" to willing consumers. Anarchist Peter Gelderloos accuses Sharp of overstating his theory's relevance to the 2011 Egyptian revolution for personal aggrandizement. In an interview in Jacobin, law graduate and adjunct lecturer Marcie Smith has stated that Sharp's theories are "ideologically incoherent" and put "protest movements in a position where they can be easily co-opted" by neoliberal capitalism.

== Works ==
Sharp's major works, including both authored and edited books, have been published since the 1950s.

=== 1960s ===
- Gandhi Wields the Weapon of Moral Power: Three Case Histories. Foreword by Albert Einstein. Introduction by Bharatan Kumarappa. Ahmedabad: Navajivan Publishing House, 1960. OCLC 2325889
- Gandhi Faces the Storm. Ahmedabad: Navajivan Publishing House, 1961. OCLC 4990988
- Civilian Defense: An Introduction, ed. with Adam Roberts and T.K. Mahadevan. Introduction by President Sarvepalli Radhakrishnan. Bombay: Bharatiya Vidya Bhavan, and New Delhi: Gandhi Peace Foundation, 1967. OCLC 2904885

=== 1970s ===
- Exploring Nonviolent Alternatives, Introduction by David Riesman. Boston: Porter Sargent, 1970.
- Correcting Common Misconceptions about Nonviolent Action. Boston: Albert Einstein Institution, 1973.
- 198 Methods of Nonviolent Action. Boston: Albert Einstein Institution, 1973.
- The Politics of Nonviolent Action, Introduction by Thomas C. Schelling. Prepared under the auspices of Harvard University's Center for International Affairs. Boston: Porter Sargent, 1973. ISBN 978-0-87558-068-5.

- I. Power and Struggle, June 1973. ISBN 978-0-87558-070-8.
- II. The Methods of Nonviolent Action, June 1973. ISBN 978-0-87558-071-5.
- III. Dynamics of Nonviolent Action. Boston: Porter Sargent, November 1985. ISBN 978-0-87558-072-2.

- Gandhi as a Political Strategist, with Essays on Ethics and Politics, Introduction by Coretta Scott King. Boston: Porter Sargent, 1979. ISBN 978-0-87558-092-0. OCLC 5591944.

- Indian edition. Introduction by Dr. Federico Mayor. Original Introduction by Coretta Scott King, New Delhi: Gandhi Media Centre, 1999. OCLC 52226697.

=== 1980s ===
- Social Power and Political Freedom. Introduction by Senator Mark O. Hatfield. Boston: Porter Sargent, 1980. ISBN 978-0-87558-091-3.
- "The Political Equivalent of War—Civilian-Based Defense" (Chapter 9). In: Social Power and Political Freedom. Introduction by Senator Mark O. Hatfield. Boston: Porter Sargent, 1980, pp. 195–257. ISBN 978-0-87558-091-3.
- Annotated Bibliography on Training For Non-Violent Action and Civilian-Based Defence, with Michael Randle. In: UNESCO Yearbook on Peace and Conflict Studies, 1981. Westport, Conn.: Greenwood Press, 1981, pp. 64-139.
- National Security Through Civilian-based Defense. Omaha: Association for Transarmament Studies, 1985. ISBN 978-0-9614256-0-9.
- Making Europe Unconquerable: The Potential of Civilian-based Deterrence and Defense (see article). London: Taylor & Francis, 1985. ISBN 978-0-85066-336-5; Second Edition with a Foreword by George F. Kennan. Cambridge, MA: Ballinger, 1986.
- Resistance, Politics, and the American Struggle for Independence, 1765-1775 (see article), ed. with Walter Conser, Jr., Ronald M. McCarthy, and David J. Toscano. Boulder, CO: Lynne Rienner Publishers, 1986. ISBN 0931477751.

=== 1990s ===
- "Transitions to Civilian-Based Defense." CBD News & Opinion, May/July 1990, pp. 6-9.
- Civilian-Based Defense: A Post-Military Weapons System, with the assistance of Bruce Jenkins. Princeton, NJ: Princeton University Press, 1990. ISBN 978-0-691-07809-0.
- From Dictatorship to Democracy: A conceptual framework for liberation (see article). Boston: Albert Einstein Institution, 2003. ISBN 978-1-880813-09-6. A book-length essay on the generic problem of how to destroy a dictatorship and to prevent the rise of a new one. Originally published in 1994.
- Nonviolent Action: A Research Guide, with Ronald McCarthy. New York: Garland Publishers, 1997.

=== 2000s ===
- There are Realistic Alternatives, 2003. ISBN 1-880813-12-2. Accessible as a LibriVox audiobook.
- Waging Nonviolent Struggle: 20th Century Practice and 21st Century Potential, with Joshua Paulson. Extending Horizons Books, 2005. ISBN 978-0-87558-162-0.
- Self-Liberation: A Guide to Strategic Planning for Action to End a Dictatorship or Other Oppression, with the assistance of Jamila Raqib. Boston: Albert Einstein Institution, November 2009. ISBN 978-1-88-081323-2.

=== 2010s ===
- Sharp's Dictionary of Power and Struggle. Oxford University Press, 2011. ISBN 978-0-19-982988-0.
- How Nonviolent Struggle Works, with Jaime Gonzalez Bernal. Boston: Albert Einstein Institution, 2013. ISBN 978-1-880813-15-7. A condensation of Sharp's Politics of Nonviolent Action.

== See also ==
- Ahimsa
- Civilian-based defense
- Civil resistance
- Joan Bondurant
- List of peace activists
- Nonviolent resistance
- Power
- Srđa Popović (activist)
- Transarmament
