= The Politics of Nonviolent Action =

Book by Gene Sharp

The Politics of Nonviolent Action (3 volumes)
- Author: Gene Sharp
- Language: English
- Publisher: Porter Sargent
- Publication date: 1973
- Publication place: United States
- Pages: 913
- ISBN: 978-0875580685
- OCLC: 691136

The Politics of Nonviolent Action is a three-volume political science book by Gene Sharp, originally published in the United States in 1973. Sharp is one of the most influential theoreticians of nonviolent action, and his publications have been influential in movements around the world. This book contains his foundational analyses of the nature of political power, and of the methods and dynamics of nonviolent action. It represents a "thorough revision and rewriting" of the author's 1968 doctoral thesis at Oxford University. The book has been reviewed in professional journals and newspapers, and is mentioned on many contemporary websites. It has been fully translated into Italian and partially translated into several other languages.

== Topics covered ==
The three volumes or "parts" of The Politics of Nonviolent Action contain a total of 14 chapters, as well as a preface by the author, and an introduction by Thomas C. Schelling. Each part begins with an introduction by the author. The first volume or "part" addresses the theory of power that implicitly or explicitly underlies nonviolent action; Volume 2 offers a detailed analysis of the methods of nonviolent action; and the Volume 3 analyzes the dynamics of nonviolent action.

=== Part One: Power and Struggle ===
Chapter 1, The Nature and Control of Political Power, explains that, although rarely articulated, there are "basically... two views of the nature of power." The "monolith theory" views people as dependent upon the good will of their governments, whereas nonviolent action is grounded in the converse "pluralistic-dependency theory" that views government as "dependent on the people's good will, decisions and support," a view that Sharp argues is "sounder and more accurate." Sharp argues that "political power is not intrinsic to the power-holder," but flows from outside sources that include perceptions of authority, available human resources; skills and knowledge; material resources; and intangible psychological and ideological factors. These sources all depend upon obedience, which arises for "various and multiple" reasons that include habit, fear of sanctions, perceived moral obligation, psychological identification with the ruler, zones of indifference, and absence of self-confidence among subjects. Obedience is essentially voluntary, and consent can be withdrawn.

Next, Nonviolent Action: An Active Technique of Struggle (chapter 2) explains that nonviolent action may be used for a diverse mixture of motives that are religious, ethical, moral, or based on expediency. "Passivity, submission, cowardice [have] nothing to do with the nonviolent technique," which is correctly understood as "one type of active response." Nonviolence has suffered scholarly neglect. Nonviolence may involve both acts of omission and acts of commission, does not rely solely on persuading the opponent, and "does not depend on the assumption that man is inherently 'good'." These and other characteristics of nonviolence are explained and illustrates through examples from ancient Rome, colonial United States, Tsarist Russia, Soviet Russia, Nazi Germany, Latin America, India, Czeschoslavakia, and the Southern United States.

Nonviolent Leaders & Campaigns
(From hundreds of examples in Politics of Nonviolent Action)

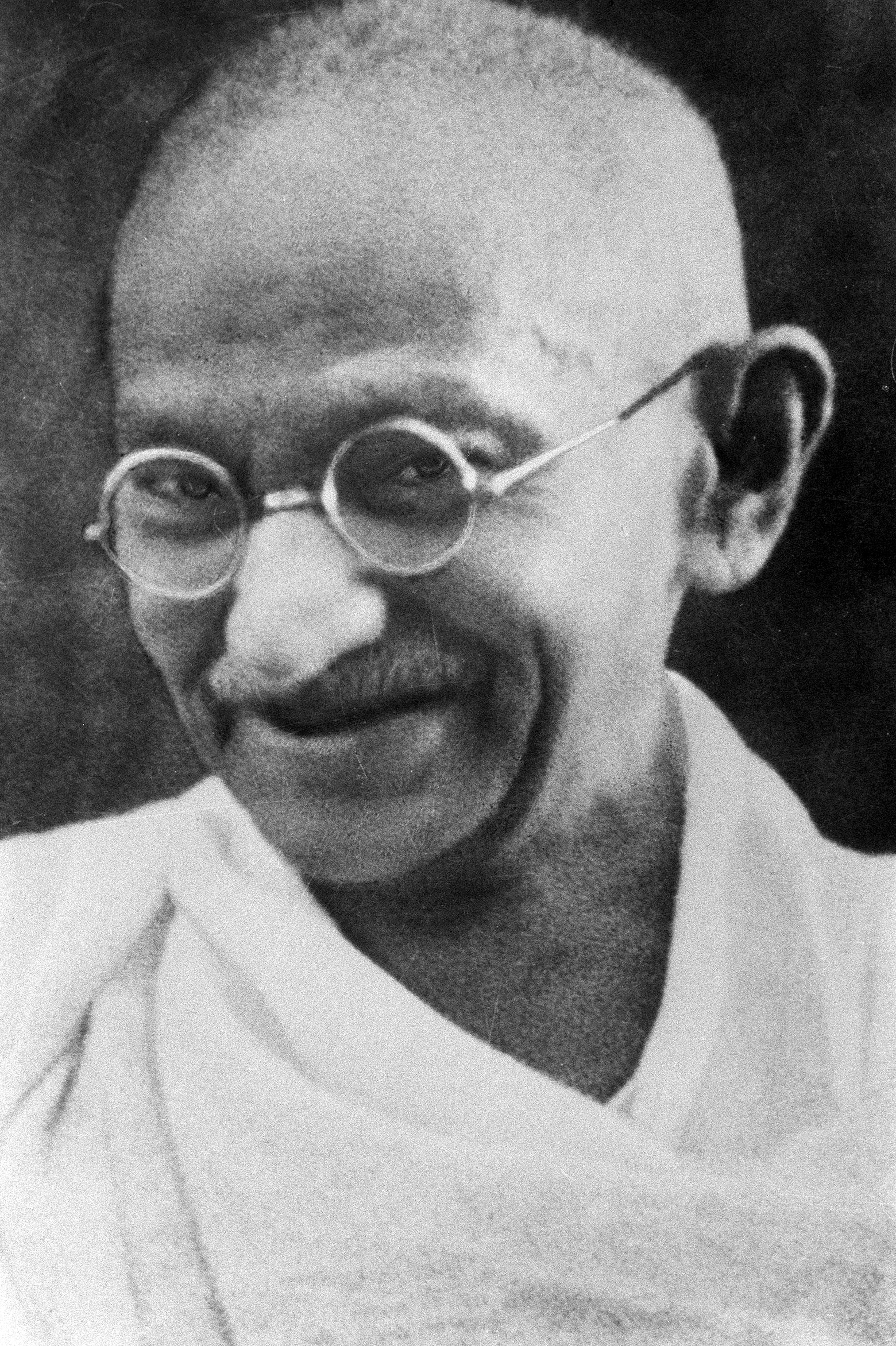
"It was Gandhi who made the most significant personal contribution in the history of the nonviolent technique"

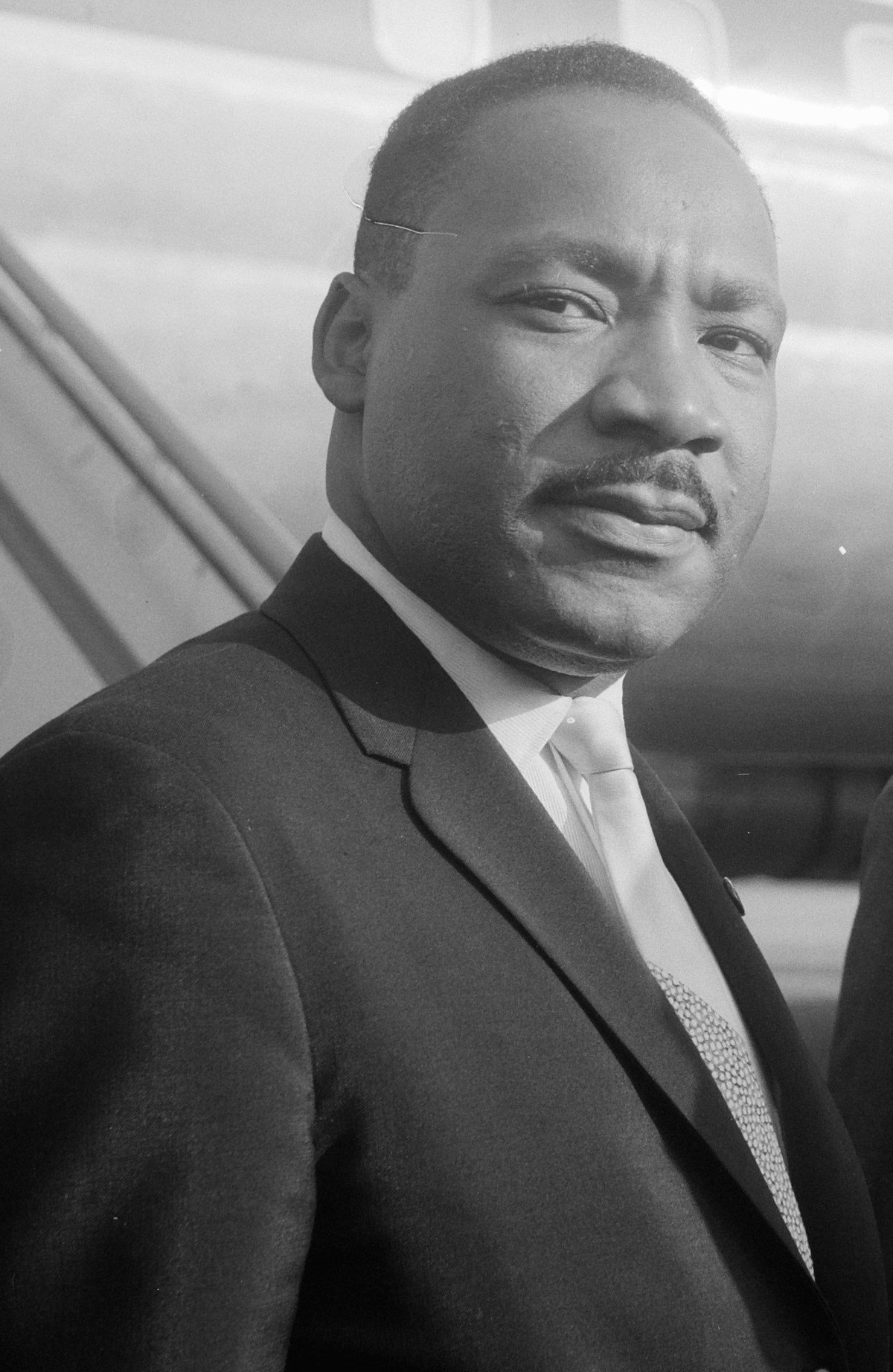
"The trial of [Martin Luther King and other] arrested leaders... became a testimony of fearlessness"

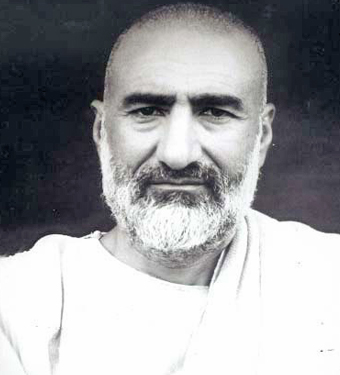
"Ghaffar Khan ... organized a powerful movement... pledged to complete nonviolence"

Methods of Nonviolent Action
(Chapters in Volume Two)

3. Nonviolent Protest & Persuasion

Describes methods that include formal statements, such as public speeches, petitions, and letters; communications with a wider audience, such as banners, newspapers and skywriting; group presentations such as deputations, picketing, or mock awards; symbolic public acts, such as public worship, displays of flags; pressures on individuals, such as vigils or fraternization; drama and music; processions; honoring the dead; public assemblies, such as protest meetings or teach-ins; and acts of withdrawal such as walk-outs or renouncing honors.

4. Social Noncooperation

Methods that include ostracism of persons; noncooperation with social events, customs or institutions, such as a student strike or a suspension of a sporting activity; and withdrawals from the social system, such as staying at home, or protest emigration (hijrat).

5. Economic Noncooperation (I) Economic Boycotts

Boycotts and other similar methods, including consumer boycotts and other consumer actions; workers' and producers' boycotts; suppliers' and handlers' boycotts; actions by owners and management, such as lockouts or traders' boycotts; actions by holders of financial resources, such as withdrawal of bank deposits; and actions by governments, such as embargos or blacklisting of traders.

6. Economic Noncooperation (II) The Strike

Various types of strikes, including symbolic strikes such as quickie walkouts; agricultural strikes; strikes by special groups such as prisoners or professionals; industrial strikes; restricted strikes, such as slowdown strikes and selective strikes; multi-industry strikes, such as a general strike; and a strike combined with economic closure, such as a hartal.

7. Political Noncooperation

Political noncooperation can be implemented through rejection of authority, as by withholding allegiance; citizens' noncooperation with government, such as boycotts of elections or refusals to assist enforcement agents; citizens' partial or full disobedience, such as slow compliance, refusal to disperse, or disobedience of 'illegitimate' laws; actions by government personnel, such as mutiny; and international government action, such as severing diplomatic relations.

8. Nonviolent Intervention

"Compared with... protest and persuasion and... noncooperation, the methods of nonviolent intervention pose a more direct and immediate challenge." They include psychological interventions, such as the hunger strike, satyagrahic fast, and reverse trial; physical interventions, such as sit-ins and nonviolent occupations; social interventions, such as guerilla theater, and establishing new social patterns or social institutions; economic interventions, such as nonviolent land seizures or establishing alternative transportation systems; and political interventions, such as seeking imprisonment or establishing a parallel government.

=== Part Two: The Methods of Nonviolent Action ===
Volume 2 (chapters 3 to 8) contains a detailed listing and description of specific methods of nonviolent action, such as boycotts, strikes, and sit-ins. Such a listing, Sharp says, "may assist actionists in the selection of methods most appropriate for use in a particular situation... [or] give researchers and persons evaluating the political potentialities of the nonviolent technique a greater grasp of its armory of methods of struggle." A total of 198 methods are listed in the table of contents, and Sharp groups them into three broad categories, protest and persuasion (ch. 3), noncooperation (chs. 4-7), and intervention (ch. 8), in terms of how they relate to the dynamics of nonviolent action (Vol. 3). These categories "ought not to be regarded as rigid, but simply as generally valid." The methods are summarized in the adjacent table.

=== Part Three: The Dynamics of Nonviolent Action ===
The third volume focuses on the dynamics of nonviolent action, which always "involves continuous change in the various influences and forces which operate in that process and are constantly influencing each other. No discussion in static terms... can be valid." It opens with Chapter 9, Laying the Groundwork for Nonviolent Action, with subsections addressing such issues as casting off fear, the social sources of power changes, leadership needs, openness and secrecy, investigation, negotiations, generating "cause-consciousness." It also describes key elements of nonviolent strategy and tactics, pertaining to issues such as initiative, timing, numbers and strength, psychological elements, application of an Indirect approach, the choice of weapons (as described in Vol. 2), and the issuance of an ultimatum.

Chapter 10 describes how the onset of nonviolent action is likely to bring various types of oppression, and reviews examples and approaches for withstanding increasing repression, which is imperative, because "without willingness to face repression... the nonviolent action movement cannot hope to succeed." Chapter 11 describes methods for maintaining the nonviolent group's solidarity, such as "Maintaining rapport" through regular mass meetings. Chapter 11 also extensively analyzes the threats against and needs for ongoing adherence to nonviolent discipline, "in order to bring into operation the changes that will alter relationships and achieve [the] objectives," even as "the opponent... tries to provoke them to commit violence - with which he could deal more effectively."

Chapter 12 covers "political jiu-jitsu... one of the special processes by which nonviolent action deals with violent repression." More specifically:

By combining nonviolent discipline with solidarity and persistence in struggle, the nonviolent actionists cause the violence of the opponent's repression to be exposed in the worst possible light. This, in turn, may lead to shifts in opinion and then to shifts in power relationships favorable to the nonviolent group. These shifts result from withdrawal of support for the opponent and the grant of support to the nonviolent actionists.

This chapter provides numerous historical examples of such political jiu-jitsu, and analyzes such factors as the impact of third party opinion and international indignation, arousing dissent and opposition in the opponent's own camp, and increasing support and participation from the grievance group.

Three Ways Success May Be Achieved (Chapter 13) describes and analyzes conversion, accommodation, and nonviolent coercion. These represent "three broad processes, or mechanisms, by which the complicated forces utilized and produced by nonviolent action influence the opponent and his capacity for action and thereby perhaps bring success to the cause of the grievance group":

In conversion the opponent has been inwardly changed so that he wants to make the changes desired by the nonviolent actionists. In accommodation, the opponent does not agree with the changes... and he could continue the struggle... but... has concluded that it is best to grant some or all of the demands.... In nonviolent coercion the opponent has not changed his mind on the issues and wants to continue the struggle, but is unable to do so; the sources of his power and means of control have been taken away from him without the use of violence . This may have been done by the nonviolent group or by the opposition and noncooperation among his own group (as, mutiny of his troops), or some combination of these.

Finally, The Redistribution of Power (Chapter 14) describes how using the nonviolent technique is likely to affect the nonviolent group, and the distribution of power between the contenders and in the larger society or system. Such effects may include the ending of submissiveness, increases in hope, effects on aggression, masculinity, crime and violence, increased group unity, and the decentralization of power. "Nonviolent action appears by its very nature to contribute to the diffusion of effective power throughout the society" due in part to the enhanced self-reliance of those using the technique.

== Reception ==
Reviews have appeared in the Armed Forces & Society, International Organization, Social Forces, Social Work, The Annals of the American Academy of Political and Social Science, Ethics, American Journal of Sociology, The Journal of Developing Areas, The Western Political Quarterly, Political Theory, The Bay State Banner, and elsewhere.

In Armed Forces & Society, Kenneth Boulding described the book as "monumental," writing that "there are some works which bear the unmistakable stamp of the classic.... and this work is a good candidate." Sharp, he said, "has been called the "Machiavelli of nonviolence" and the "Clausewitz of nonviolent warfare" [and] the comparisons are by no means unjust." The book "reveals a large but previously mostly unnoticed segment of human action relationship which would very properly be described as 'nonviolent warfare.'" Boulding asserted several parallels with a seminal work in his own field, economics, explaining that

this volume... reminds one of [Adam Smith's] The Wealth of Nations. There is a single theme of immense importance to society played in innumerable variations throughout the whole work. There is a wealth of historical illustration and detail. There is a distinct view of society as a whole seen perhaps from a somewhat unfamiliar angle. And there is a wholly honorable passion for human betterment through intellectual clarification.

Boulding stated that if a key word for economics is "exchange," then the key word for nonviolent action is "disobedience" - "One might almost call Gene Sharp's book, therefore... the discovery of disobedience, especially of large-scale disobedience.... nonviolent action is concerned with the institutionalization of a threat-defiance system." A key to this process, Boulding argues, is the "dynamics of legitimacy... [the] public denial of the legitimacy of some command," which Sharp "hints at many times," although Sharp "never quite works [it] out in detail." Boulding described Part II as "in some ways... the meatiest and richest part of the work," although he noted that Sharp's examples are drawn from "quite restricted range" of human history:

There must be many examples from Chinese history; Latin America is hardly mentioned; and the European middle ages, with its extraordinary phenomenon of the "Truce of God," receives hardly a mention. Nevertheless, Sharp's examples are broad and wide and illustrate the universality and significance of this phenomenon, which, simply because it has not had a name, has been grossly neglected by conventional historians.

Boulding also reported some ways that Sharp's theoretical analysis seemed to be deficient, "even in terms of what might be called 'classical' or Gandhian theories of nonviolence." The book's analysis

neglects the importance of "Satyagraha" or "Truth-grasping," that is, the appeal of nonviolent action to some objective truth, even an objective moral truth, as the basic source of its legitimacy. In this sense nonviolent action is closer to the spirit of science than it is to the spirit of war, in that it is concerned... that truth should prevail no matter who wins. Sharp, perhaps in too great a reaction to the accusations of sentimental pacifism sometimes brought against nonviolence, has stressed the conflictual aspects of it perhaps to the exclusion of its integrative aspects."

In International Organization, Bleicher's 21-page review stated that "What Professor Sharp... has demonstrated is that our understanding of the dependency of governments upon the continuing consent of the governed can be translated into the development of nonviolent action as a strategy of change that is effective outside of established institutional arrangements and yet operates without the use of force." He wrote that Sharp

has exposed the inadequacy of assuming the monolithic character of the nation state in international relations theory. Recognition of nonviolent action as a tool in the hands of governments and citizens to influence the policies of other nations and of international organizations calls for a fundamental re-evaluation of the critical parameters in the study and conduct of international relations.

Bleicher stated that the "full utilization of this new understanding requires an expansion of the horizons of scholars and policy makers in the international arena, the collection and application of new data in the evaluation of international relations, and the development of new theoretical constructs." He warned that if we do not develop a better understanding of phenomenon related to nonviolence, we face the danger that we will be progressively less able to... design policies and institutions that can cope with the future."

In Political Theory, Carl J. Friedrich wrote that Sharp considers his view of power as "much more original than it is," and that the reviewer [Friedrich] found it "exasperating to try and follow arguments with the drift of which he definitely sympathized, except for their alleged novelty." In particular, Sharp does not

relate [his view of power] to such classics as Charles Merriam's magisterial treatment of power, or even Bertrand Russell's journalistic book on the subject. He seems unaware of the reviewer's [Friedrich's] analysis of many years ago, in which the distinction between two views of power, and the dependence of power on the cooperation of those over whom it is wielded, was analytically developed, and its root in the classics was shown.

Friedrich also stated that a "fundamental weakness" of Sharp's argument was his understanding of violence "as physical violence," since "some of the most vicious forms of coercion are psychic." Furthermore "According to Sharp, violence by definition excludes demolition and destruction of things, such as machinery, buildings and the like. Hence, according to him, much sabotage is not violent; clearly at this point Sharp deviates markedly from popular usage." Due to the "illusory" nature of the distinction based on physical violence alone, Sharp is often "confused," although "many thoughtful arguments are offered." Friedrich concluded that "the topic of how to avoid violence in political conflicts is an important one, the treatment given here is learned, but not very clear, and the results not conclusive," but that the book was a "timely one" that he hoped it will "lead to further more searching studies."

In The Western Political Quarterly, H. L. Nieburg wrote that he "would like to see the work cut down to 125 pages and published in paperback as a token of new life for insurgency politics. But, this... should not deter one from the duty to welcome a monumental, competent, and sometimes exciting, work of scholarship."

In Social Work, Harry Specht stated that "Sharp has performed a useful service for students of community organizing by producing an encyclopedic description of nonviolent action," and that "by shear weight of detail, the reader comes to recognize that nonviolent action has been far more pervasive than many assume." Specht stated that the books flaws included "repetition and excessive detail," and that the book "seems to imply that nonviolent action is usually undertaken by the oppressed against the state and that it is usually in the cause of positive social change. But... for example, I have just read of two massive nonviolent demonstrations in Boston, one for and the other against integration of the public schools." Specht described an "absence of a clear theoretical framework.... it does not illuminate such central questions as... Why is nonviolent action used in some cases and not in others? Why does it work in some cases and not in others?" The book is also "rich with writings on social movements and thin on theorists such as Kenneth Boulding, Amitai Etzioni, Jerome Skolnick, and Ralf Dahrendorf - who have dealt with conflict and violence." Still, "Sharp's work is an impressive accomplishment that will be welcomed as an important addition to the literature of community organizing."

== Other influence ==
The book has been mentioned in various other publications, including Utne, the American Conservative, the CNN website, and elsewhere. Because of how influential Gene Sharp has been, there are several sites and groups that have undertaken the task of creating online databases that provide explanations and examples of the original 198 methods and new tactics that have developed over the years. These sites include New Tactics in Human Rights; Global Nonviolent Action Database; Actipedia; and Nonviolence International. Two reports for the International Center of Nonviolent Conflict have expanded the number and type of tactics by including digital and other methods.

== Editions ==
The Politics of Nonviolent Action originally appeared in 3 volumes in English in 1973, and has subsequently been translated fully or partially into several other languages. The English language edition was published by Porter Sargent in 3 volumes entitled: 1. Power and struggle, 2. The methods of nonviolent action, and 3. The dynamics of nonviolent action. The respective citations of the 3-volume set and of each individual volume are:

- Sharp, Gene (1973). The Politics of Nonviolent Action. Boston, MA: Porter Sargent. ISBN 0875580688. ISBN 978-0-87558-068-5 LCCN 72--95483 (3 volumes)
  - Sharp, Gene (1973). Power and Struggle - part one of: The Politics of Nonviolent Action. Boston, MA: Porter Sargent. ISBN 0-87558-070-X. ISBN 978-0-87558-070-8 (pages 1–106)
  - Sharp, Gene (1973). The Methods of Nonviolent Action - part two of: The Politics of Nonviolent Action. Boston, MA: Porter Sargent. ISBN 0-87558-071-8. ISBN 978-0-87558-071-5 (pages 107-446)
  - Sharp, Gene (1973). The Dynamics of Nonviolent Action - part three of: The Politics of Nonviolent Action. Boston, MA: Porter Sargent. ISBN 0-87558-072-6. ISBN 978-0-87558-072-2 (pages 447-902)

In 2013, Sharp published a 143-page English language condensation:

- Sharp, Gene; Bernal, Jaime Gonzalez (2013). How Nonviolent Struggle Works. East Boston, MA: Albert Einstein Institution. ISBN 978-1-880813-15-7. (condensation of Sharp's Politics of Nonviolent Action)

Full or partial non-English translations have appeared in languages that include Arabic, Dutch, Italian, Polish, and Spanish:

- Sharp, Gene (1986). المقاومة اللا عنفية / al-Muqāwamah al-lā-ʻunfīyah / The Politics of Nonviolent Action. Mubārak ʻAwaḍ (trans.). القُدس / al-Quds / Jerusalem: المركز الفلسطيني لدراسات اللاعنف، / al-Markaz al-Filasṭīnī li-Dirāsāt al-Lā ʻUnf, / Palestinian Centre for the Study of Nonviolence. OCLC 60497927. (377 pages, Arabic)
- Sharp, Gene (1982) [1973]. Macht en strijd: theorie en praktijk van geweldloze actie / Power and conflict: theory and practice of nonviolent action. Utrecht; Antwerp: Uitgeverij Het Spectrum. ISBN 9789027454676. ISBN 9027454671, OCLC 17600616 (235 pages, Dutch)
  - Sharp, Gene; Wim Robben (1980). De politiek van geweldloze aktie: samenvatting van het boek van Gene Sharp "The politics of nonviolent action" / The politics of nonviolent action: summary of the book. Amsterdam: Centrum voor geweldloze weerbaarheid / Center for Nonviolent Resistance. ISBN 9789070161552. ISBN 9070161559, OCLC 63320441 (90 pages, Dutch summary)
- Sharp, Gene (1985–1997). Politica dell'azione nonviolenta [Potere e lotta, 1985; Le tecniche, 1986; La dinamica, 1997]. Turin: Grupo Abele. OCLC 797232879. (814 pages [163, 338 & 313], Italian, full translation)
- Sharp, Gene (1985). Walka bez użycia przemocy / Non-violent struggle. Warsaw: Adsum. OCLC 63534675. (19 pages, Polish partial translation)
- Sharp, Gene (1988). Caridad Inda (ed.). La lucha política noviolenta: criterios y metodos / Nonviolent political struggle: criteria and methods. Translated by Jaime Gonzalez Bernal. Santiago: Ediciones Chile América CESOC. OCLC 21192950. (114 pages, Spanish abridged translation)

== See also ==
- From Dictatorship to Democracy
- Making Europe Unconquerable
- Resistance, Politics, and the American Struggle for Independence, 1765-1775
- How to Start a Revolution, documentary directed by Ruaridh Arrow
