= Making Europe Unconquerable =

Making Europe Unconquerable: The Potential of Civilian-Based Deterrence and Defence
- (cover, 1985 Ballinger paperback)
- Author: Gene Sharp
- Language: English
- Genre: European defense; Political science
- Publisher: Taylor & Francis; Harper & Row (Ballinger)
- Publication date: 1985
- Publication place: United States
- Pages: 250
- ISBN: 978-0-85066-336-5 ISBN 978-0-88730-097-4; ISBN 978-0-85066-329-7; ISBN 0-85066-336-9; ISBN 0-88730-097-9; ISBN 0-85066-329-6 (pbk.); ISBN 0-85066-336-9 (hard)
- OCLC: 12188415

Making Europe Unconquerable is a book about how civilian-based defense can be incorporated into the foundations of European defense and collective security. Written by Gene Sharp, the book was originally published in the United Kingdom and United States in 1985. Its subtitle was the potential of civilian-based deterrence and defense. The book was reviewed in major newspapers, magazines, and professional journals. Although it advocated a significant departure from existing defense policies, it received a favorable review from George F. Kennan, widely perceived as one of the major architects of the US approach to the Cold War. Later in the same year, the book was republished with a foreword from Kennan. It has also been published in Dutch and Italian editions.

== Topics covered ==
In its opening pages, Making Europe Unconquerable states that

This book is mostly about... ‘civilian-based defence’... In this policy, the whole population and the society's institutions become the fighting forces. Their weaponry consists of a vast variety of forms of psychological, economic, social, and political resistance and counter-attack... to deny the attackers their objectives and to make consolidation of political control impossible. These aims would be achieved by applying massive and selective noncooperation and defiance [and seeking] to create maximum international problems for the attackers and to subvert the reliability of their troops and functionaires.

— pp. 2–3

Making Europe Unconquerable contains 7 chapters entitled

1. Meeting Europe's defense needs
2. Civilian-based defense for Western Europe?
3. Transarmament
4. Preventing attack
5. In face of attack
6. Defeating attack
7. Assessing the potential

The book also contains a bibliography (12 pages) and an index (24 pages).

== Reviews and influence ==
Reviews have appeared in the New York Review of Books, the New York Times, the Bulletin of the Atomic Scientists, Foreign Affairs, International Affairs, Journal of Peace Research, and elsewhere.

In the New York Review of Books, George F. Kennan, widely viewed as a major architect of the US approach to the Cold War, wrote that Sharp's "primary purpose in writing the book was... 'to make civilian-based deterrence and defense a thinkable policy which is recognized as meriting further research, policy studies, and an evaluation.' And for this, he makes a reasonably good case." Kennan stated that "the view advanced in this book deserves consideration, if only because of the bankruptcy of all the visible alternatives to it." Kennan viewed Sharp's approach as requiring

a change in political philosophy. For it taps, as Mr. Sharp says in his final passages, ‘a crucial insight into the nature of power’—namely, that ‘all political power is rooted in and continually dependent upon the co-operation and obedience of the subjects and institutions of the society…. It is indeed possible for whole societies to apply that insight’

Kennan wondered "whether, if this change in political philosophy were to take place, it might not have wider effects than just those that relate to the concepts of national security—whether many other things might not also change, and, in the main, usefully so," and advised that Sharp

must not expect... that the effort to win understanding for his views will be easy going... It will arouse in many circles the same skepticism, and perhaps the same derision, that this reviewer brought down upon himself when he had the temerity to advance somewhat similar ideas in a widely publicized radio lecture delivered over the facilities of the BBC many years ago.

In the New York Times, Karl E. Meyer described the book as "reflective," and stated that "there is considerable merit to [Sharp's] contention that 'all peoples can with effort make themselves politically indigestable to would-be tyrants.'" Meyer also argued that Sharp's approach "has its flaws... If the stakes are deemed sufficiently vital, civilian resistance seems unlikely to dissuade a determined aggressor."

In Foreign Affairs, Andrew Pierre wrote that

The value of this thoughtful work is in the alternative it suggests: ‘civilian defense’ through advance training for such actions against an intruder as mass public demonstrations, boycotts and strikes, demoralization of enemy troops, and the like.

— pp. 872–73

He added that "The author's proposals go against the grain of mainstream thinking, and to this reviewer leave many questions unanswered, but they are carefully put forward in a nonpolemical manner and clearly merit sustained attention and thought" (p. 873).

Ted Taylor, himself a former designer of nuclear weapons, reviewed the book in the Bulletin of the Atomic Scientists. He quoted Einstein:

‘The unleashed power of the atom has changed everything save our modes of thinking, and we thus drift toward unparalleled catastrophe.’ Although Albert Einstein's admonition has been quoted innumerable times, it has not, with few exceptions, led to deep and persistent thought about alternatives... One of these exceptions is in the writings of Gene Sharp about what he calls ‘civilian-based defense’... Making Europe Unconquerable is especially timely. (p. 54

He added that "The side effects of pursuing a civilian-based defense strategy are especially interesting, since they tend to be beneficial in peacetime. This is a book that should be read attentively by anyone seriously searching for new ways of thinking about how we can stop our "drift toward unparalleled catastrophe." (p. 56).

== Editions ==
English language editions:

- Sharp, Gene (1985). Making Europe Unconquerable (1st ed.). Cambridge, MA: Harper & Row (Ballinger). ISBN 978-0-85066-329-7. OCLC 12188415. ISBN 0-85066-329-6 (250 pages)
- Sharp, Gene (1985). Making Europe Unconquerable (1st ed.). London: Taylor & Francis. ISBN 978-0-85066-329-7. OCLC 246346260. ISBN 0-85066-329-6 (pbk), ISBN 0-85066-336-9 (cased) (xii, 250 pages)
- Sharp, Gene (1985). Making Europe Unconquerable. Cambridge, MA: Harper & Row (Ballinger). OCLC 476129978., with a foreword by George F. Kennan. ISBN 0-85066-329-6, ISBN 0-85066-336-9 (xxiv, 190 pages)

Foreign (non-English) language editions:

- Dutch: Gene Sharp (1988). Naar een onveroverbaar Europa: de kracht van civiele afschrikking en sociale verdediging (met een voorw. van George F. Kennan; vert. uit het Engels: Peter Kruijt et al.). Antwerpen, Netherlands: Internationale Vredesinformatiedienst, 1988. ISBN 978-90-70316-40-2 (ISBN 9070316404)
- Italian: Gene Sharp (1989). Verso un'Europa inconquistabile (introduzione di G. Pasquino). Bergamo, Italy: Gruppo Abele, 1989. Edizione italiana a cura di Fulvio Cesare Manara. ISBN 978-88-7670-123-8 (ISBN 8876701230)

== See also ==
- Gene Sharp (gives additional explanation of concepts)
- The Politics of Nonviolent Action (Sharp's major theoretical work)
- Civilian-based defense (the development of the concept)
