= Protest emigration =

Emigration as an activist tactic

Protest emigration (also called hijrat or deshatyaga in South Asia) is the use of emigration as an activist tactic when it is felt political change is not currently possible inside a jurisdiction. Gene Sharp in The Politics of Nonviolent Action describes this as a form of social noncooperation.

In some traditions, such emigrations have been symbolically analogized to the Hijrah or to the Exodus.

== Pre-modern class conflict ==
This was a method used against local lords by peasants and lower classes in the secessio plebis of Ancient Rome and in Japan as well as Southeast Asia. Fugitive peasants were a recurring phenomenon under European serfdom. This tactic has also been noted as important to the formation of various pre-colonial African states, as well as a template for later eras.

== Anticolonial resistance ==
This featured in several anticolonial and decolonization movements, including in British India, as in the Hijrat of 1920 from North-West Frontier Province to independent Afghanistan associated with Abul Kalam Azad of the Khilafat Movement, and in the 1928 Bardoli Satyagraha and 1930 Salt March operations which included some migrations from Gujarat to the princely Baroda State. Hijrat was a tactic commended several times by Gandhi as appropriate to certain circumstances. This tactic was also proposed but not pursued as a form of resistance to concessions in China. And it was also significant in emigration from French West Africa to the Gold Coast and other colonies of British West Africa.

== Radical federalism ==
In a country under strong federalism such as the United States, protest can take the form of an internal migration through foot voting to better individual lives, or in a more utopian mode, to alter the political character of a sub-national state through a directed partisan sorting.

== See also ==
- Inner emigration
