= Fugitive peasants =

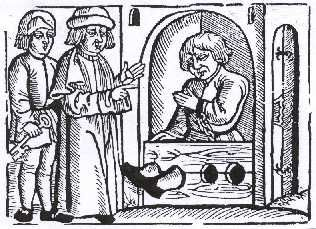
A peasant in stocks in a 16th-century Polish woodcut

Fugitive peasants (also runaway peasants, or flight of peasants) are peasants who left their land without permission, violating serfdom laws. Under serfdom, peasants usually required permission to leave the land they lived on.

Running away was seen as the ultimate form of passive nonviolent peasant resistance (with a peasant rebellion being on the other end of the spectrum). Escape was a highly effective form of resistance, as it was difficult to prevent, damaging to the landowner and difficult and costly in addressing. It was also one of the most common form of peasant resistance, a regular occurrence in the societies with serfdom. It is difficult to estimate the scale of the problem, but it was regarded as significant. In 18th-century Russia, for example, tens of thousands of runaway peasants were captured every year, but that number likely represents only a fraction of those who successfully eluded recapture. Jezierski described the phenomenon of fugitive peasants as commonplace in medieval Poland. In most countries with the institution of serfdom, leaving one's land was illegal. However, regulations that existed, they were often poorly enforced, disputed by various stakeholders and changed back and forth over time.

In medieval Poland, for example, there were laws against the flight of peasants, but their enforcement was usually left in the hands of the landowners. Escape was sometimes encouraged by other landowners, who needed labour and promised better working conditions, even if such attitude was illegal and penalised by a fine, which compounded the problem. Similar problems existed in medieval Russia, Ottoman Empire, Germany, and other places. Stanziani writes about 17th-century Russia: "For a few few fugitives who were returned to their 'legitimate owners', millions of other peasants were left in their new places". Legal cases involving runaway peasantry represented a significant part of legal proceedings in many countries, such as in the Duchy of Livonia.

Peasants chose to escape if they felt that they had little to lose; or suffered from heavy taxation and exploitation, theft and hunger; or wanted to avoid military conscription or religious persecution. Peasants usually ran away to neighbouring provinces, and less often, to foreign countries. However, significant differences between serfdom regimes in various countries could encourage international flight. In the 18th century the Russian serfs were escaping from Russia to the Polish–Lithuanian Commonwealth (where previously harsh conditions were improving) in significant enough numbers to become a major concern for the Russian Government sufficient to play a role in its decision to partition the Commonwealth.

In Eastern Europe, the lands of the Cossacks were seen during the Early Modern Period as a refuge for many runaway serfs. That is reflected in a folk Russian saying "С Дону выдачи нет!" ("There is no extradition from the Don!"), in reference to Don Cossacks.

== See also ==
- Fugitive
- Fugitive slaves in the United States
- History of serfdom
- Peasant movement
- Protest emigration
- Serfdom in Russia
- Timeline of abolition of slavery and serfdom
