= From Dictatorship to Democracy =

1994 book by Gene Sharp

- Author: Gene Sharp
- Language: English & 30+ others
- Publisher: Albert Einstein Institution
- Publication date: 1994; others
- Publication place: United States; others
- English publication date: 1994
- Pages: 93 (2010); others
- ISBN: 9781880813096
- OCLC: 706499601
- Text: From Dictatorship to Democracy at Wikisource

From Dictatorship to Democracy, A Conceptual Framework for Liberation is a book-length essay on the generic problem of how to destroy a dictatorship and to prevent the rise of a new one. The book was written in 1993 by Gene Sharp (1928–2018), a professor of political science at the University of Massachusetts. The book has been published in many countries worldwide and translated into more than 30 languages. Editions in many languages are also published by the Albert Einstein Institution of Boston, Massachusetts. As of 2012 its current primary English-language edition is the Fourth United States Edition, published in May 2010.

The book has been circulated worldwide and cited repeatedly as influencing movements such as the Arab Spring of 2010–2012.

== Origin ==
From Dictatorship to Democracy (FDTD) was written in 1993 at the request of a prominent exiled Burmese democrat, Tin Maung Win, who was then editor of Khit Pyaing (The New Era Journal), in Bangkok, Thailand. The book took several months to write as the author drew upon several decades of experience in scholarship on nonviolent action. FDTD was first published in 1993 as installments in Burmese and English in Khit Pyaing. In 1994, it was issued as a booklet in both English and Burmese. Since that time, there have been several additional English-language editions and translations into more than 30 additional languages.

== Topics covered ==
From Dictatorship to Democracy contains a preface and ten sections. Its first appendix includes 198 Methods Of Nonviolent Action that were taken from Gene Sharp's The Politics of Nonviolent Action (1973), Part Two, The Methods of Nonviolent Action. The main sections of the 4th US edition are entitled:

1. Facing Dictatorships Realistically
2. The Dangers of Negotiations
3. Whence Comes the Power?
4. Dictatorships Have Weaknesses
5. Exercising Power
6. The Need for Strategic Planning
7. Planning Strategy
8. Applying Political Defiance
9. Disintegrating the Dictatorship
10. Groundwork for Durable Democracy

Three appendices are included in the fourth US edition of FDTD:

Appendix 1. The Methods of Nonviolent Action
Appendix 2. Acknowledgements and Notes on the History of From Dictatorship to Democracy
Appendix 3. A Note About Translations and Reprinting of this Publication
For Further Reading

Appendix 3 gives a step-by-step procedure for effectively translating FDTD into other languages.

== Influence ==
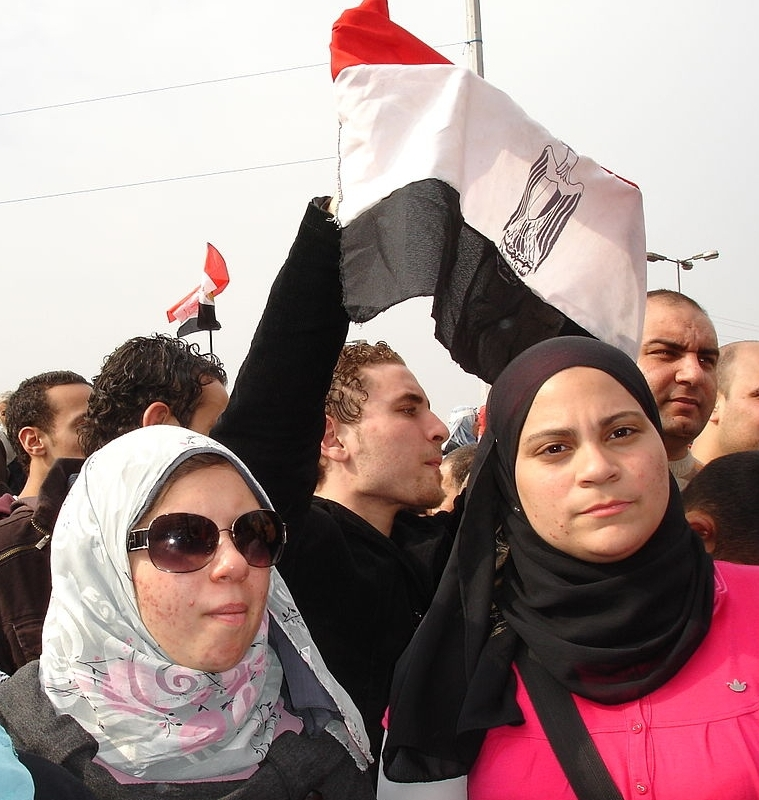
Egyptian women protesting during the Arab Spring, Feb. 2011.

From Dictatorship to Democracy has been circulated worldwide and cited repeatedly as influencing movements such as the Arab Spring (pictured) in 2011. Sharp has stated that after FDTD was first written, "although no efforts were made to promote the publication for use in other countries, translations and distribution of the publication began to spread on their own.... We usually do not know how awareness of this publication has spread from country to country."

A CNN profile of Sharp in 2012 stated that FDTD had "spread like a virus," calling it a "viral pamphlet." The book "started life in Myanmar as incendiary advice printed on a few sheets of paper and surreptitiously exchanged by activists living under a military dictatorship." Later it "took on a life of its own... eventually, some say, inspiring the uprisings known as the Arab Spring."

The Pakistani Daily Times stated that FDTD "has had an impact on the Arabic-speaking world even though the setting is in a non-Arabic world."

Non-English Editions; From Dictatorship to Democracy
Language	Year	Information
Afan Oromo	2011	* (Ethiopia)
Amharic	2007	* (Ethiopia)
Arabic	2004, 2009	* OCLC 743320612 70p (2004); OCLC 770709135 (2009) Radwan Ziadeh (intro.), Khaled Dar Omar (trans.). Beirut: Arab Scientific Publishers
Azeri	2005	* OCLC 743320450 84p
Belarusian	2001, 2005	* OCLC 770709132 68p
Burmese	1995	* OCLC 85355067, OCLC 770709134 83p
Chin	2001	* (Burma)
Chinese	2005	Traditional* or simplified* OCLC 74331687252p
Croatian	1999	OCLC 70965409 84p
Danish	2011	OCLC 770780462 139p, Jesper Jordan (trans.)
Dari	2011	* Mohammad Raqib (trans.)(Afghanistan)
Dhivehi	‡	(Maldives)
Farsi	2004	* OCLC 743321251 48p (Iran)
French	2009	* OCLC 743789703 137p, Dora Atger (trans). Paris: Harmattan
Georgian	‡
German	2008, 2011	* OCLC 725121629 Andreas Wirthensohn (trans.) Berlin: Parlando
Indonesian	1997	* OCLC 68008711 108p, Abdurrahman Wahid, Franz Magnis-Suseno (preface), Sugeng Bahagijo (trans.). Jakarta: Pustaka Sinar Harapan
Italian	2011	* Massimo Gardella (trans.) ISBN 978-88-6190-190-2
Jingpho	2001	* (Myanmar)
Karen	2001	* 1118p (Myanmar)
Khmer	2005	* (Cambodia)
Kurdish	‡
Kyrgyz	2005	* 87p
Mon	2001	* 142p (Myanmar)
Nepali	‡
Pashto	2008	*
Russian	2005	* OCLC 70117352 221p, with Bruce Jenkins. Ekaterinburg: Ulʹtra Kulʹtura
Serbian	1999	* 84p, Novi Sad: Civic Initiatives
Spanish	2003	* Caridad Inda (trans.) ISBN 1-880813-13-0
Tibetan	2006, 2009	* OCLC 609983386 173p, Padma-tshe-dbaṅ (trans)
Tigrinya	2006	* (Eritrea)
Ukrainian	2004	*
Uzbek	‡
Vietnamese	2005	* Viet Tan (trans.)
*Listed on Albert Einstein Institution website
‡Listed by Sharp (2010)

The Financial Times, in discussing the prospects for dictators worldwide, described Sharp as "the Lenin of the new Gandhi-ism" stating that

What is new... is the wildfire spread of systematically non-violent insurgency. This owes a great deal to the strategic thinking of Gene Sharp, an American academic whose how-to-topple-your-tyrant manual, From Dictatorship to Democracy, is the bible of activists from Belgrade to Rangoon.

The BBC reported in 2004 that FDTD "was used practically as a textbook" in lectures attended by members of Otpor!, the Serbian resistance movement, in the year 2000.

The New York Times reported in 2011 that From Dictatorship to Democracy had been posted by the Muslim Brotherhood on its website during the 2011 Egyptian revolution.

In 2012, The New York Times noted that FDTD was "available for download in more than two dozen languages" (and provided a link), while describing Sharp as a "leading [advocate] of grass-roots democracy."

In June 2015, the Financial Times reported that the Chinese government had tried to buy language rights to FDTD:

FDTD has been reviewed in newspapers.

In 2015, 17 activistists were charged for an attempted coup d'état in Angola, including Laurinda Manuel Gouveia, and one of the proofs presented was the possession of the book FDTD.

== Editions ==
The book was first published in 1993 in installments in Burmese and English in Khit Pyaing in Bangkok, Thailand. In 1994, it was issued as a booklet in both languages, with the assistance of the Committee for the Restoration of Democracy in Burma. Since that time, there have been several additional English-language editions. There have also been editions in at least 30 other languages (see table at right). The English-language editions include:

- Sharp, Gene (1994). From dictatorship to democracy: A conceptual framework for liberation (1st English language ed.). Bangkok, Thailand: Committee for the Restoration of Democracy in Burma. OCLC 35447780. (79 pages)
- Sharp, Gene (2003). From dictatorship to democracy: A conceptual framework for liberation (2nd ed.). Boston, MA: Albert Einstein Institution. (93 pages)
- Sharp, Gene (2008). From dictatorship to democracy: A conceptual framework for liberation (3rd ed.). Boston, MA: Albert Einstein Institution. OCLC 791449678. (93 pages)
- Sharp, Gene (2010). From dictatorship to democracy: A conceptual framework for liberation (4th ed.). Cambridge, MA: Albert Einstein Institution. ISBN 9781880813096. OCLC 702484909. (93 pages)
- Sharp, Gene (2011). From dictatorship to democracy: A conceptual framework for liberation. Michael Randle (preface). Pontypool, Wales: Green Print. ISBN 9781854251046. OCLC 780844332. London: Housmans Bookshop. (93 pages)
- Sharp, Gene (2012). From dictatorship to democracy: A conceptual framework for liberation (4th English ed.). Melbourne (Parkville), Australia: Custom Book Centre. ISBN 9781921775369. (102 pages)
- Sharp, Gene (2012). From dictatorship to democracy: A conceptual framework for liberation. London: Serpent's Tail. ISBN 9781846688393. OCLC 791419484. (138 pages)
- Sharp, Gene (2012). From dictatorship to democracy: A conceptual framework for liberation. New York: The New Press. ISBN 9781595588500. OCLC 778419479. (prepublication)

== See also ==
- Nonviolent revolution
- Mohandas Karamchand Gandhi (1869–1948)
- Resistance to Civil Government (1849), by Henry David Thoreau
