= I. R. Christie =

British historian

I. R. Christie FBA
- Born: Ian Ralph Christie; 11 May 1919; Preston, Lancashire
- Died: 25 November 1998 (aged 79); Poole, Dorset
- Spouse: Ann Hastings (m. 1992)

Academic background
- Education: Magdalen College, Oxford
- Influences: Lewis Namier

Academic work
- Discipline: History
- Sub-discipline: Late eighteenth century British political history
- Institutions: University College, London (1948–1984)

Ian Ralph Christie, FBA (11 May 1919 – 25 November 1998) was a British historian specialising in late 18th-century Britain. He spent most of his academic career at University College London (UCL), from 1948 to 1984.

== Early life ==
He was born in Preston, Lancashire, to John Reid Christie and his wife, Gladys Lilian (née Whatley) Christie. He was educated at home as he was unable to attend school due to glandular fever and a bronchial illness. After his recovery, he moved to Worcester to live with an aunt and was educated at Worcester Royal Grammar School (1931–38). He was senior prefect in his last year and his chosen sixth-form subjects were history and English literature. He represented Worcester Grammar at the 1937 Empire Rally and was impressed with Stanley Baldwin's speech. However, he was opposed to appeasement, regarded Nazism as barbarism and treated left-wing opposition to rearmament with contempt.

He went to Magdalen College, Oxford in 1938 to study modern history. In 1940 C. S. Lewis taught him political theory but his studies were interrupted by the Second World War, where he volunteered for non-combatant duties (due to ill-health) in the Royal Air Force. He served in the equipment branch from August 1940 to April 1946 and ended as a commissioned officer. He later regarded his war service as the most important thing he had done in his life. He spent periods of inactivity reading political theory, including Bertrand Russell's Power: A New Social Analysis and R. G. Collingwood's New Leviathan.

He returned to Oxford in April 1946, where his history tutors were K. B. McFarlane and A. J. P. Taylor. Christie later wrote that he had "greatly enjoyed" Taylor's tutorials because he displayed his "iconoclastic thinking in a period of later modern British history which greatly interested me". In 1948 his father died and he graduated later in the year with second class honours.

== Academic career ==
In 1948, whilst still at Oxford, J. E. Neale offered Christie an assistant lectureship in history at University College London. Christie accepted Neale's offer and replied: "Mr A. J. P. Taylor here has said he will procure me an introduction to Professor Namier in order that I may get advice on my proposed subject for research". Christie adopted Namier's historical method and his first work, The End of North's Ministry (1958), was the second volume in Namier's series, England in the Age of the American Revolution. Christie paid tribute to Namier in the book's preface:

To Sir Lewis Namier I owe many thanks: first, when I had only met him in his books, for prompting in me a strong desire to know whether his picture of politics and party structure at the accession of George III was still valid for the period some twenty years later, when the political system was under strain as a result of defeat in the American War of Independence; and, since this study began, for his guidance and encouragement.

A. J. P. Taylor, who had quarrelled with Namier a year before, said in his review of The End of North's Ministry that Christie had demonstrated that Namier's ideas about eighteenth century politics had been proved wrong by one of his leading disciples. Christie later wrote that Taylor's review had demonstrated "utter ignorance of the whole general thrust of my book". He dedicated his last book, British ‘non-élite’ MPs, 1715–1820 (1995), to Namier.

Christie held the assistant lectureship in history until 1951, when he was promoted to lecturer, a post he held until 1960. He was then appointed reader (1960–66) before being promoted to professor (1966–79), Dean of Arts (1971-73), chairman of the history department (1975–79) and Astor Professor of British History (1979–84). In 1964 he became joint literary director (with Geoffrey Barrow) of the Royal Historical Society, which they held for six years.

According to Negley Harte, Christie told him that he had become an historian "because he wanted to understand why for centuries intelligent people had believed in Christianity". However, Christie said in his unpublished autobiography that he had tried at Oxford to steer clear of topics involving "the to me wearisome wranglings of past generations over religious issues".

In his second work, Wilkes, Wyvill and Reform: The Parliamentary Reform Movement in British Politics, 1760–1785 (1962), Christie explored the movement for parliamentary reform that was led by John Wilkes and Christopher Wyvill. Christie said of the Unreformed House of Commons: "[B]y and large this extraordinary system worked not unsuccessfully" and was "appropriate to the Britain of its day". John B. Owen called it an excellent general survey that superseded G. S. Veitch's The Genesis of Parliamentary Reform.

His third book, Crisis of Empire, was a scholarly narrative of the relationship between Britain and the American colonies between 1754 and 1783.

Christie wrote a considerable number of biographies for The History of Parliament's volume, The House of Commons, 1754–1790 (1964) but in 1969 he turned down the editorship of the 1790–1820 volumes due to his work at UCL. From 1973 until 1996 he was a member of the editorial board of the History of Parliament Trust. Christie also edited the third volume of Jeremy Bentham's correspondence for UCL's The Collected Works of Jeremy Bentham. He learnt Russian for this purpose, as Bentham had visited Catherine the Great in the hope that she would become an enlightened ruler.

He became a Fellow of the British Academy in 1977. When Anthony Blunt's treason was exposed in 1979, Christie said he would have resigned from the Academy if Blunt had not been expelled or resigned. This led to a breach with his former tutor, A. J. P. Taylor, who resigned from the Academy in protest against the treatment of Blunt.

In 1983 he delivered the Ford Lectures at Oxford, on the reasons why Britain avoided revolution, which were subsequently published by Oxford University Press as Stress and Stability in Late Eighteenth-Century Britain (1984). Christie argued that eighteenth century Britain was a country where "oligarchical government stood foursquare on its foundations in the tacit consent of the people" and that "there was no danger of revolution in Britain in the 1790s". What defeated revolutionary forces in Britain, Christie asserted, was "a deep-rooted pragmatism" rooted in "the slow evolution of the English common law". He ended the work by quoting John of Gaunt's "sceptred isle" speech from William Shakespeare's Richard II.

J. C. D. Clark said that Christie's theme in his Ford Lectures of a "deeply-shared sense of national identity" was perhaps "an unwelcome message to some of his audience", whose reaction was "often extremely cool". P. D. G. Thomas argued that Christie's "convincing synthesis" refuted E. P. Thompson's The Making of the English Working Class and that "Christie's characteristically subtle and systematic analysis is clinched by the imaginative flourish that British prejudice against foreigners was an antidote to the contagion of revolution".

In his retirement speech, Christie provoked controversy when he said that when he joined the department in 1948 there were great men in it, and that he was confident that one day there would be again.

Christie was also opposed to the revisionist history of the Second World War: when Maurice Cowling published an article in the Sunday Telegraph on the 50th anniversary of the war that questioned whether Britain should have fought Germany in 1939, Christie drafted a long letter to the paper's editor (with an even longer covering letter to Cowling), in which he defended the necessity of a war in defence of civilisation and vigorously denounced the Holocaust.

== Personal life ==
In 1992 he married Ann Hastings.

== Works ==
- The End of North's Ministry, 1780–82 (1958).
- Wilkes, Wyvill and Reform: The Parliamentary Reform Movement in British Politics, 1760–1785 (1962).
- Crisis of Empire: Great Britain and the American Colonies 1754-1783 (1966).
- Myth and Reality in Late-Eighteenth-Century British Politics, and Other Papers (1970).
- ‘The Historians' Quest for the American Revolution’, in Anne Whiteman, J. S. Bromley and P. G. M. Dickson (eds.), Statesmen, Scholars and Merchants: Essays in Eighteenth-Century History presented to Dame Lucy Sutherland (Oxford University Press, 1973), pp. 181–201.
- Empire or independence, 1760-1776: a British-American dialogue on the coming of the American Revolution, co-edited with Benjamin W. Labaree, (1976).
- Stress and Stability in Late Eighteenth-Century Britain: Reflections on the British Avoidance of Revolution (1984).
- ‘George III and the historians: thirty years on’, History, new ser., 71 (1986), pp. 205–21.
- ‘Party in Politics in the Age of Lord North's Administration’, Parliamentary History 6 (1987), pp. 47–68.
- ‘Conservatism and stability in British society’, in Mark Philp (ed.), The French Revolution and British Popular Politics (Cambridge University Press, 1991), pp. 169–187.
- British ‘non-élite’ MPs, 1715–1820 (1995).
