= Joan Bondurant =

American political scientist

- Born: December 18, 1918; Great Bend, Kansas
- Died: September 12, 2006 (aged 87); Tucson, Arizona
- Citizenship: American
- Education: University of Michigan
- Scientific career
- Fields: Political science, civil resistance, nonviolent revolution
- Workplaces: University of California, Berkeley, University of the Pacific

Joan Valerie Bondurant (December 18, 1918 – September 12, 2006) was an American political scientist and former spy for the Office of Strategic Services (OSS) during World War II. She is best known as the author of Conquest of Violence: The Gandhian Philosophy of Conflict (1958), a book on Gandhian political philosophy.

== Early life and intelligence work ==
Bondurant was born on 16 December 1918 in Great Bend, Kansas. She was gifted in the piano, and graduated from the University of Michigan with a degree in music.

When World War II broke out, she learned Japanese, and was sent to work for the OSS in India, arriving in New Delhi in May, 1944.

== Scholarly career and later life ==
While in India, she met Mahatma Gandhi, and became interested in his nonviolent approach to politics. Returning to the US, Bondurant obtained a doctoral degree in political science at the University of California, Berkeley (1952). She then published Conquest of Violence: The Gandhian Philosophy of Conflict (1958), a widely reviewed and influential book on Gandhian politics.

Later, she took a job teaching at University of the Pacific.

Her collection of personal and research papers was given to the Department of Rare Books, Special Collections, and Preservation of River Campus Libraries at the University of Rochester in 2012 and was opened to researchers in 2015.

== Selected works ==
- Bondurant, Joan V. (1988). Conquest of violence: the Gandhian philosophy of conflict (New Revised ed.). Princeton, NJ: Princeton University Press. ISBN 9780691022819. OCLC 17385168.
  - Bondurant, Joan V. (1958). Conquest of violence: the Gandhian philosophy of conflict (1st ed.). Princeton, NJ: Princeton University Press. OCLC 154176074.
- Fisher, Margaret Welpley; Joan V. Bondurant (1956). The Indian experience with democratic elections. Berkeley, CA: University of California. OCLC 989639.
- Fisher, Margaret Welpley; Joan V. Bondurant (1956). Indian approaches to a socialist society. Berkeley, CA: Institute of International Studies, University of California. OCLC 845127212.
- Bondurant, Joan V. (1946). Sketches of India, with forty-one photographic illustrations. Ann Arbor, MI: Craft Press. OCLC 4579134.

== See also ==
- Gene Sharp
