= Constructive Program =

Constructive Program is a term coined by Mahatma Gandhi to describe one of the two branches of his satyagraha, the other being some form of nonviolent resistance, e.g. civil disobedience. The value of a Constructive Program in the struggle for the independence of India cannot be overemphasized, as Gandhi described civil disobedience as "an aid to constructive effort." Gandhi wrote to his friend and supporter, Jamnalal Bajaj, saying, "My real politics is constructive work." Gandhi's constructive work included a campaign for people to spin their own cloth at home and mine their own salt to avoid having to buy from the British in their anti-colonial struggle.

As opposed to obstructive forms of nonviolence that focus on tearing down systems of oppression, a constructive program's focus is about creating more imaginative, just, and equal communities through focusing on equality, economic self-reliance, education, and environmental efforts. In this way, they complement civil disobedience and other forms of direct action and protest by lessening reliance on the oppressor.

Constructive programs can build alternative institutions so that a successful insurrection does not lead merely to a power vacuum that lets oppression return, such as in Egypt after the otherwise-successful overthrow of President Hosni Mubarak in 2011.

Constructive programs can also act as models of the world that movements are working to build. For example, prison industrial complex abolitionists in the United States work to end mass incarceration, but while doing that broad system-change work, some groups also focus on working on paying bail of those jailed pre-trial who are held only because they cannot afford bail. One such program is National Bail Out, who focus on bailing out as many Black mothers and caregivers as they can and providing employment opportunities to those bailed out.

Other examples include:

- Time-based currency, which is a way to exchange services instead of currency.
- Implementing a community food pantry or doing street feeds, such as those done by Food Not Bombs.
- The creation of community gardens allows for fresh, sustainable food access within the community. It also helps reduce negative environmental impacts and promotes sustainable agriculture, can create healthy food options in Food apartheid neighborhoods and Food swamps.
- Creating alternative affordable housing communities, like Community First! Village, Tiny Homes Detroit, and Settled's Sacred Settlement Program
- The Free Breakfast for School Children program started by the Black Panther Party.
- Self-Managed Social Centers like Metelkova, Warzone Collective, Participative Ljubljana Autonomous Zone, Firestorm Books & Coffee, and C-Squat, that offer community programs and often are housed in formerly abandoned buildings, claiming and beautifying spaces that had previously been vacant and decaying.
- Little Free Libraries and Little Free Pantries
- Food cooperatives
- Mutual Aid programs
- Seed libraries and Seed swap as means to share plant seeds, particularly of native and heirloom plants for
