= Civilian-based defense =

Non-military action by a social group

Civilian-based defense or social defence describes non-military action by a society or social group, particularly in a context of a sustained campaign against outside attack or dictatorial rule – or preparations for such a campaign in the event of external attack or usurpation. There are various near-synonyms, including "non-violent defence", "civilian defence" and "defence by civil resistance". Whatever term is used, this approach involves preparations for and use of a range of actions – which can be variously called nonviolent resistance and civil resistance – for national defence against invasion, coup d'état and other threats.

Writings about this concept include works by Brigadier General Edward B. Atkeson, Erica Chenoweth (U.S.) and Maria Stephan (U.S.), Theodor Ebert (Germany), Brian Martin (Australia), Adam Roberts (UK), Gene Sharp (U.S.), Heinz Vetschera (Austria), and others.

== Other usages of term ==
"Social defence" as defined and summarized here is distinct from certain other usages of this term. For example, within the framework of its system of Total Defence, the Singapore government's civil defence/national security policy uses the term "social defence" as a synonym for social inclusion policies.

== Gene Sharp's views ==
Civilian-based defense, according to Gene Sharp, a scholar of non-violent struggle, is a "policy [in which] the whole population and the society's institutions become the fighting forces. Their weaponry consists of a vast variety of forms of psychological, economic, social, and political resistance and counter-attack. This policy aims to deter attacks and to defend against them by preparations to make a society unrulable by would-be-tyrants and aggressors. The trained population and the society's institutions would be prepared to deny the attackers their objectives and to make consolidation of political control impossible. These aims would be achieved by applying massive and selective noncooperation and defiance. In addition, where possible, the defending country would aim to create maximum international problems for the attackers and to subvert the reliability of their troops and functionaries." In 1994, Michael Randle wrote, "Some of the chief exponents of the concept—including Roberts and Sharp...would exclude instances of civil resistance against invasions, occupations or coups which occurred without a pre-arranged national plan...indeed on these grounds, Sharp concludes that there has never been an historical instance of civilian-based defense but only improvised prototypes of it."

In Europe the policy is usually called civilian defense or social defense.

Sharp also wrote that the term civilian-based defense "indicates defense by civilians (as distinct from military personnel) using civilian means of struggle (as distinct from military and paramilitary means). This is a policy intended to deter and defeat foreign military invasions, occupations, and internal usurpations." This defense "is meant to be waged by the population and its institutions on the basis of advance preparation, planning, and training." However, the potential for civilian-based-defense as a complement to military defense has also been raised.

The Civilian-based Defense Association and its magazine Civilian-based Defense promoted the policy. Concerning the potential for these tactics, Can Erimtan wrote, "Gene Sharp... has written... books on 'Civilian-Based Defense' and democracy that can serve as blueprints for popular uprisings against authoritarian regimes."

== Application of idea to particular countries ==
A number of studies have considered the possible application to particular countries of the idea of a defence policy based on civil resistance. In the United Kingdom, in 1959 Commander Sir Stephen King-Hall supported unilateral nuclear disarmament by Britain, and proposed an alternative containing some reliance on conventional force plus "a defence system of non-violence against violence". A 1976 study published by the Strategic Studies Institute describes civilian-based defense as a strategy that may be effective against U.S. forces. Brigadier General Edward B. Atkeson wrote in 1976, "CBD may have some attractiveness to Japan. Certainly the program would have more appeal to the strong pacifist element in the society then would heavy investment in military rearmament, and yet it would provide a unique measure of novel self-reliance which might also appeal to more militant nationalist groups...Japan could become the first major power in history to develop a formula for securing its way of life without a military defense". Concerning Norway during World War II, Atkeson notes, The leadership of the Norwegian resistance recognized the futility of a 'children's crusade' against the German troops but was able to mount a successful nonviolent struggle against the domestic fascist administration which led ultimately to collapse of the regime." He adds "Other countries which may, at some time, come to believe that there are greater benefits fewer risks in CBD then in military defense are Portugal, Luxembourg, Denmark, Italy, Belgium and the Netherlands... If there is a major power in Europe with some prospect of an opportunity for transarmament, it may be France… with no foreign forces on its soil, and few commitments abroad of consequence." In 1983 an independent non-governmental body in the UK, the Alternative Defence Commission, examined the idea thoroughly and saw possibilities in it, but came out in favour of NATO countries adopting a posture of "defensive deterrence" – i.e. deterrence based on non-nuclear weapons and strategies, including an element of military defence in depth.

With regard to an invasion where the goal is simply to occupy territory, Michael Randle observes, "If, for instance, the opponent's aim is to establish a strategic outpost in a remote area, there may be little or no face-to-face contact with the indigenous population. Obviously any dependence on local supplies offers a possible point of leverage but, as Sharp suggests, it may be more appropriate in such cases to concentrate on mustering international pressure, for instance by third-party countries and by the UN. Some of his suggestions for meeting this kind of situation have a flavour of de Ligt – 'organised action by dock workers, pilots, airport workers and others to halt travel, transportation, and shipping of needed materials'. In exceptional circumstances, he suggests, a 'non-violent invasion', along the lines of the attempted invasion of the Portuguese enclave of Goa in 1955 by Indian satyagrahis, might be attempted."

Since the end of the Cold War the idea of defence by civil resistance has been pursued in several countries, including the Baltic states. However, with the partial and limited exception of Sweden, it has generally not attracted support from major political parties, and it has not been adopted as a major plank in the security policy of any country.

== See also ==
- Civil defense
- Civil disobedience
- Kapp Putsch
- Prague Spring
- Nonviolence
- Nonviolent Peaceforce
- Nonviolent resistance
- Revolutions of 1989
