= Ruaridh Arrow =

British journalist and film-maker

- Occupation(s): Producer and director
- Website: http://www.howtostartarevolution.org

Ruaridh Arrow is a British journalist and film-maker known for his 2011 feature documentary How to Start a Revolution about Nobel Peace Prize nominee Dr Gene Sharp.

The film was described as an underground hit with the Occupy movement, which launched around the time of the film's release in September 2011. In 2012 the film won a BAFTA Scotland New Talent Award in the 'Factual: Over 30 Minutes' category. How to Start a Revolution won Best Documentary at the 2011 Raindance Film Festival in London. It was funded by Arrow and via the crowdfunding site Kickstarter.

Educated at King's College London and Glasgow University, Arrow was named Sky News Student Reporter of the Year at the Guardian Student Media Awards in 2004.
