= Albert Einstein Institution =

American non-profit organization

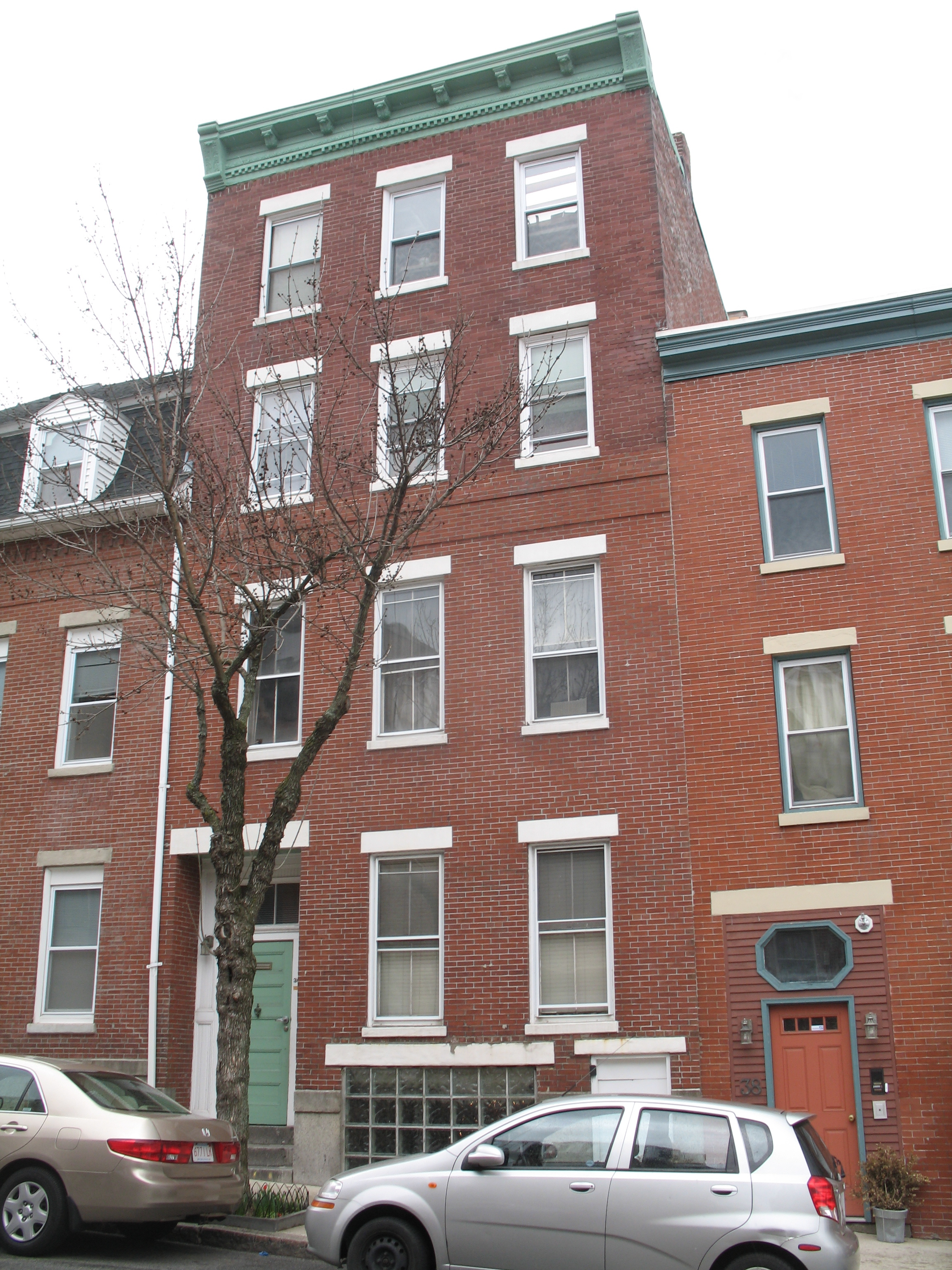
- The AEI on Cottage Street in East Boston.
- Abbreviation: AEI
- Formation: 1983
- Type: Non-profit
- Purpose: To advancing the study and use of strategic nonviolent action in conflicts throughout the world.
- Headquarters: East Boston, Massachusetts, United States
- Executive Director: Jamila Raqib
- Key people: Gene Sharp
- Website: www.aeinstein.org

The Albert Einstein Institution (AEI) is a non-profit organization specializing in the study of the methods of nonviolent resistance in conflict. It was founded by scholar Gene Sharp in 1983, and named after Albert Einstein.

Until 2000, the institute provided funding for Einstein Institution Fellowships for scholars, sometimes referred to as Einstein Fellows, and was also the funding body for the Program on Nonviolent Sanctions in Conflict and Defense at Harvard's Center for International Affairs.

Jamila Raqib has been executive director since 2005.

== History ==
The research institute is named after the physicist Albert Einstein, who was a committed pacifist, although not an "absolute pacifist"; he recognized that pacifism would not work against Hitler in 1933. It was founded by political scientist Gene Sharp, whose first book, about the methods of Indian pacifist Gandhi, included an article on nonviolence signed by Einstein as a preface.

The AEI was incorporated in July 1983, two months after the Program on Nonviolent Sanctions in Conflict and Defense was created at the Center for International Affairs (CFIA) (now the Weatherhead Center for International Affairs, or WCFIA) at Harvard University. This program operated as a research division under the framework and policies of the center, with its focus the use of nonviolent sanctions as a substitute for violent interventions. The Program provided grants or fellowships for scholars in residence, as well as conducting seminars and conferences. For the first few years, the Program at the CFIA lobbied for funding itself, as well as obtaining some funding from the AEI; after 1987 policy changes were made to reduce confusion and the AEI became solely responsible for raising the funds to support the CFIA Program as well as its own activities.

Around 2004, one of its major donors, former student of Sharp and co-founder of International Center on Nonviolent Conflict in 2002, businessman Peter Ackerman, withdrew his funding, and Sharp started running the institute out of his home in Boston.

Jamila Raqib joined AEI in 2002, at first managing the promotion of its publications and translations. In 2005 she became its executive director, and in 2009 collaborated with Sharp to publish Self-Liberation: A Guide to Strategic Planning for Action to End a Dictatorship or Other Oppression, which has been translated into several languages.

Sharp remained as senior scholar at AEI until his death in 2018.

== Governance ==
The articles of incorporation stated that institution is an independent non-profit organization, to be publicly funded and to act as "a grant-making and grant seeking organization".

As of April 2021, Jamila Raqib is executive director, and Cornelia Sargent is chair.

== Aims and work ==
The institution "is committed to the defense of freedom, democracy, and the reduction of political violence through the use of nonviolent action", and looks at ways by which nonviolent means can be employed to deal with problems such as "aggression, dictatorship, genocide and oppression.

In order to achieve its aims, it encourages research and policy studies on the methods of nonviolent action; shares the results of this research with the public; and engages with groups that are in conflict, about the possible use of nonviolent action as a strategy. It prepares, translates, presents and publishes educational resources, and publishes books, pamphlets, conference proceedings and other materials.

It has consulted with pro-democracy groups from countries such as the Baltic states, Burma, Equatorial Guinea, Iran, Iraq Serbia, Thailand, Venezuela, and Zimbabwe. and the Occupied Palestinian Territories.

== Fellowships ==
The Albert Einstein Institution provided a number of Einstein Institution Fellowships to scholars working on various aspects of nonviolent struggle. This was an honorary position, and the Einstein Institution Fellows were either paid only a modest stipend, or not at all in the first few years. Between 1983 and 1988 Einstein Institution Fellows included Nathan Stoltzfus and Alex P. Schmid, who published the revised edition of Political Terrorism based on his work undertaken as a Fellow.

In late 1988, the Fellowship program was expanded into a continuing, international, competitive program, appointing fellows annually. This continued through until 2000, but owing to diminishing funding, the 1999–2000 Einstein Fellows appear to be the last.

== In film ==
A feature documentary by Scottish director, Ruaridh Arrow, How to Start a Revolution, about the global influence of the Albert Einstein Institution and Sharp's work was released in September 2011. The film won "Best Documentary" and "The Mass Impact Award" at the Boston Film Festival in September 2011. The European premiere was held at London's Raindance Film Festival on October 2, 2011, where it also won Best Documentary. It went on to be screened at Occupy camps across the US and Europe, including at the Bank of Ideas in London. The film has been described as the unofficial film of the Occupy Wall St movement, being shown in Occupy camps in cities all over the world.

== Criticism ==
In 2007 former Venezuelan president Hugo Chávez accused the Albert Einstein Institution of being behind a "soft coup" attempt in Venezuela. The Albert Einstein Institution have dismissed such accusations. In response to the accusations against the institution, professor Stephen Zunes initiated a petition titled "Open Letter in Support of Gene Sharp and Strategic Nonviolent Action" which expresses support for Dr Sharp and the Albert Einstein Institution. The petition was signed by many prominent left-wing scholars and activists, including Howard Zinn and Noam Chomsky.
