= Porter Sargent =

American educational critic (1872–1951)

Porter Edward Sargent
- Born: June 6, 1872; Brooklyn
- Died: March 27, 1951 (aged 78)
- Occupations: Publisher, educational critic

Porter Edward Sargent (June 6, 1872 – March 27, 1951), born in Brooklyn, New York, was a prominent educational critic and founder of Porter Sargent Publishers in Boston in 1915. In 1949, he was described as "probably the most outstanding and consistent critic of the American educational scene."

== Early life ==
In his youth, Sargent's family moved to a ranch in San Bernardino, California. In 1892, he became principal of a San Bernardino grammar school. The next year he went to study at Harvard University, where he obtained his bachelor's (1896) and masters (1897). Among the professors who influenced him were William James, Nathaniel Shaler, Charles Eliot Norton, and William Gilson Farlow. After graduation, Sargent taught school in Cambridge, and did graduate research on neurology, publishing 10 scientific papers, but quitting before he received his doctorate. For a decade beginning in 1904, Sargent ran a travel school for boys, in which he led tours to Europe and other parts of the world.

== Publishing and educational criticism ==
In 1915, Sargent began publishing the Handbook of Private Schools. Moehlman wrote that Sargent's "annual Forewords to the Handbook of Private Schools gradually evolved into the most comprehensive critiques of education published anywhere. His candid treatment of vested interests, of educational cant, of stuffed shirts, of the tradition-encrusted academic mind and, above all, the sacred cows of privilege and tradition brought them into more prominence with each succeeding edition." Because other publishers feared libel suits, Sargent was "forced to become his own publisher."

The Handbook's fourth edition (1918) was more than 700 pages in length, had dozens of chapters in four long sections entitled 1. "Introductory," (e.g., 'History of the private school,' 'The new school movement,' 'vocational education,' etc.), 2. "Critical Description of Schools and Summer Camps" (by gender, curriculum, region), 3. "Comparative Tables," and 4. "Educational Directories." Immediately after the table of contents, it also contained the following invitation to readers:

Parents and Prospective Patrons of the Private Schools are cordially invited to call upon or write Mr. Sargent for intimate information and unprejudiced advice. Please state the Problem clearly. No Fees are accepted.

Sargent's interests gradually expanded into many fields. Moehlman wrote that in the 1940s, because of Sargent's writings,

the annual critiques and other solid books, including one of poetry, that pour steadily from Porter Sargent's pen have developed a growing and regular audience. More than ten thousand people buy his books every year, and an estimated forty thousand more look over their shoulders to read without meeting the admission price.

Reviewing one of Sargent's books in 1947, Edmund A. Opitz wrote that

what Porter Sargent says ... is important, but not so important as what he is. He is an independent and intelligent dissenter, a type once thought to be rather characteristic of New England and of which we were justly proud. It is our misfortune and the country's that this type is now rare ... He keeps his thinking open at both ends ... He is one of our best provokers of thought".

The Saturday Review of Literature, reviewing Sargent's War and Education in 1943, wrote that "Every guild needs its gadfly, and none more than the teaching profession." It stated that readers of the book "will be shocked or delighted according to their temperaments."

In 1949, Arthur B. Moehlman, also referring to Sargent as having the "role of a gadfly," wrote that

Probably the most outstanding and consistent critic of the American educational scene since 1914 has been Porter Sargent of Boston, who is also a national authority on the private school. Always interesting, always stimulating, Charles A. Beard complained that he "keeps me up at night following the shooting stars and wondering what is to come next."

After Sargent's death in 1951, his son F. Porter Sargent (1915–1975) assumed leadership of the Porter Sargent publishing house.

== Written works (selected) ==
- New immoralities: clearing 'the way for a new ethics. Boston:Porter Sargent, 1935. OCLC 3794581
- What makes lives. Boston:Porter Sargent, 1940. OCLC 4942772
- War and education. Boston:Porter Sargent, 1943. OCLC 1157926
- Between two wars; the failure of education, 1920–1940. Boston:Porter Sargent, 1945. OCLC 2511666
- The future of education. Boston:Porter Sargent, 1945. OCLC 3278612
