= 32nd federal electoral district of the State of Mexico =

Federal electoral district of Mexico

State of Mexico's 32nd
- Electoral district of the Chamber of Deputies of Mexico

- 32nd district since 2005

Incumbent
- Member: Luis Enrique Martínez
- Party: ▌Labour Party
- Congress: 66th (2024–2027)

District
- State: State of Mexico
- Head town: Valle de Chalco Solidaridad
- Coordinates: 19°17′30″N 98°56′20″W
- Covers: Valle de Chalco Solidaridad
- PR region: Fifth
- Precincts: 115
- Population: 391,584 (2020 census)

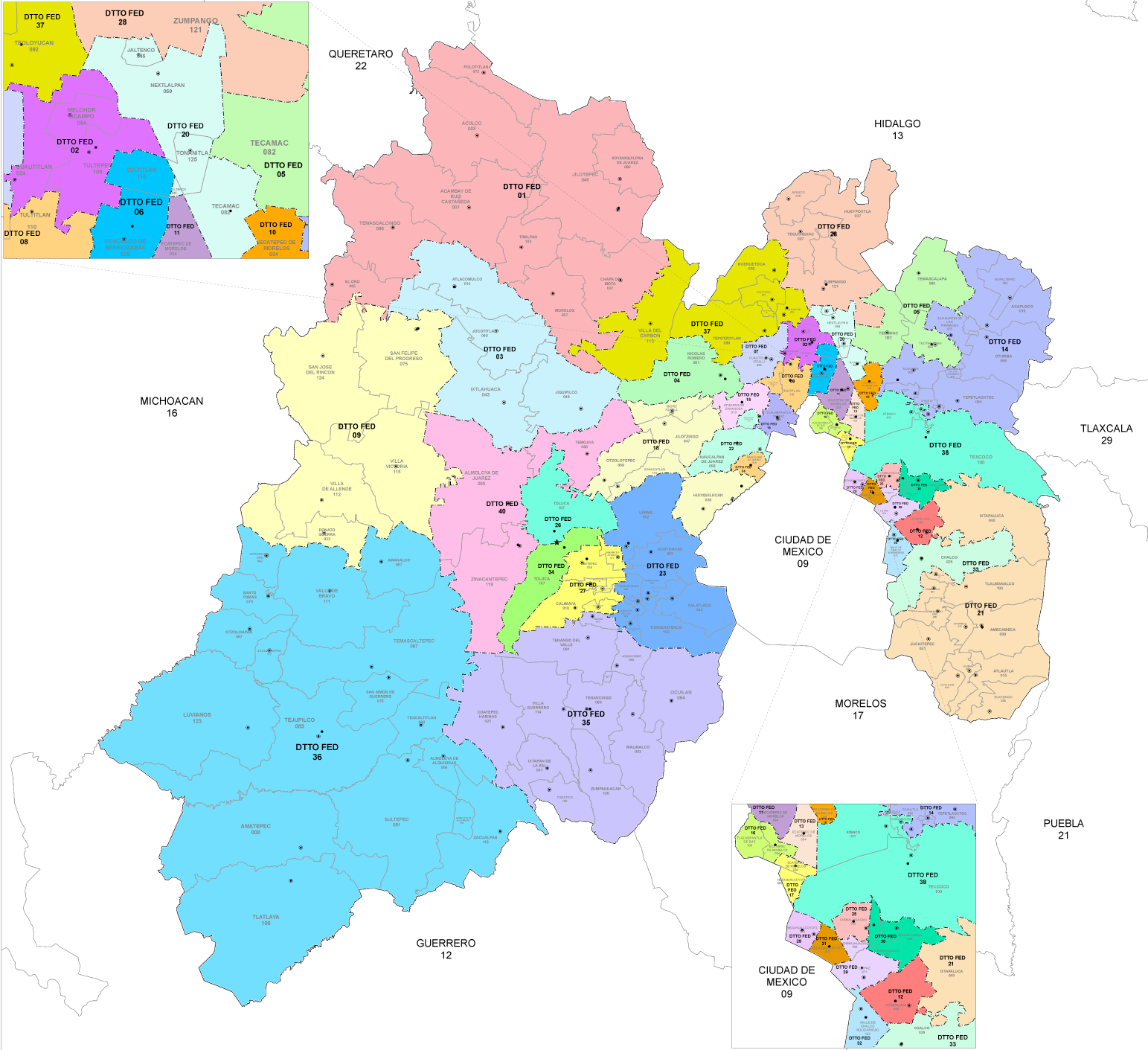
Federal electoral districts of the State of Mexico since 2023

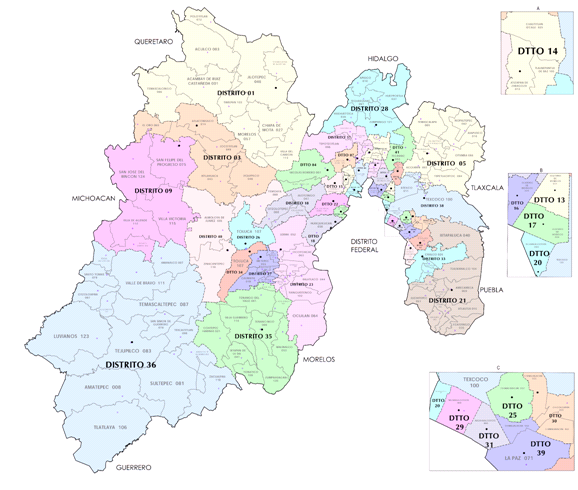
2017–2022 districting scheme

The 32nd federal electoral district of the State of Mexico (Spanish: Distrito electoral federal 32 del Estado de México) is one of the 300 electoral districts into which Mexico is divided for elections to the federal Chamber of Deputies and one of 40 such districts in the State of Mexico.

It elects one deputy to the lower house of Congress for each three-year legislative session by means of the first-past-the-post system. Votes cast in the district also count towards the calculation of proportional representation ("plurinominal") deputies elected from the fifth region.

The 32nd district was created by the 1977 electoral reforms, which increased the number of single-member seats in the Chamber of Deputies from 196 to 300. Under that plan, the State of Mexico's seat allocation rose from 15 to 34. The new districts were first contended in the 1979 mid-term election.

The current member for the district, re-elected in the 2024 general election, is Luis Enrique Martínez Ventura of the Labour Party (PT).

== District territory ==
Under the 2023 districting plan adopted by the National Electoral Institute (INE), which is to be used for the 2024, 2027 and 2030 federal elections, the 32nd district is located in the east of the Greater Mexico City urban area and covers the 115 electoral precincts (secciones electorales) that make up the entirety of one of the state's 125 municipalities:

- Valle de Chalco Solidaridad

The head town (cabecera distrital), where results from individual polling stations are gathered together and tallied, is the municipal seat, Valle de Chalco Solidaridad. In the 2020 census, the district reported a total population of 391,584.

== Previous districting schemes ==
Evolution of electoral district numbers
| | 1974 | 1978 | 1996 | 2005 | 2017 | 2023 |
|---|---|---|---|---|---|---|
| State of Mexico | 15 | 34 | 36 | 40 | 41 | 40 |
| Chamber of Deputies | 196 | 300 | | | | |

Under the previous districting plans enacted by the INE and its predecessors, the 32nd district was situated as follows:

2017–2022

The municipality of Valle de Chalco Solidaridad.

2005–2017

The municipality of Valle de Chalco Solidaridad.

1996–2005

The municipalities of Valle de Chalco Solidaridad and La Paz.

1978–1996

A portion of the municipality of Ecatepec.

== Deputies returned to Congress ==
(Mexico) National parties
- Current
- PAN
- PRI
- PT
- PVEM
- MC
- Morena
- PAZ
- Somos
- Defunct or local only
- PLM
- PNR
- PRM
- PNM
- PP
- PPS
- PARM
- PFCRN
- CON
- PANAL
- PSD
- PES
- PES
- PRD

State of Mexico's 32nd district
| Election | Deputy | Party | Term | Legislature |
|---|---|---|---|---|
| 1979 | Jesús Alcántara Miranda | Institutional Revolutionary Party | 1979–1982 | 51st Congress |
| 1982 | Raúl Vélez García | Institutional Revolutionary Party | 1982–1985 | 52nd Congress |
| 1985 | Gerardo Higinio Fernández Casanova | Institutional Revolutionary Party | 1985–1988 | 53rd Congress |
| 1988 | Margarita Sánchez Gavito Díaz | Institutional Revolutionary Party | 1988–1991 | 54th Congress |
| 1991 | José Alfredo Torres Martínez | Institutional Revolutionary Party | 1991–1994 | 55th Congress |
| 1994 | Gaspar Ávila Rodríguez | Institutional Revolutionary Party | 1994–1997 | 56th Congress |
| 1997 | Feliciana Olga Medina Serrano | Party of the Democratic Revolution | 1997–2000 | 57th Congress |
| 2000 | Salvador Castañeda Salcedo | Institutional Revolutionary Party | 2000–2003 | 58th Congress |
| 2003 | Isaías Soriano López | Institutional Revolutionary Party | 2003–2006 | 59th Congress |
| 2006 | Alma Lilia Luna Munguía | Party of the Democratic Revolution | 2006–2009 | 60th Congress |
| 2009 | Miguel Ángel Luna Munguía | Institutional Revolutionary Party | 2009–2012 | 61st Congress |
| 2012 | Arturo Cruz Ramírez | Party of the Democratic Revolution | 2012–2015 | 62nd Congress |
| 2015 | Alma Lilia Luna Munguía | Institutional Revolutionary Party | 2015–2018 | 63rd Congress |
| 2018 | Luis Enrique Martínez Ventura | Labour Party (Mexico) | 2018–2021 | 64th Congress |
| 2021 | Luis Enrique Martínez Ventura | Labour Party (Mexico) | 2021–2024 | 65th Congress |
| 2024 | Luis Enrique Martínez Ventura | Labour Party (Mexico) | 2024–2027 | 66th Congress |

== Presidential elections ==
State of Mexico's 32nd district
| Election | District won by | Party or coalition | % |
|---|---|---|---|
| 2018 | Andrés Manuel López Obrador | Juntos Haremos Historia | 64.1475 |
| 2024 | Claudia Sheinbaum Pardo | Sigamos Haciendo Historia | 72.6649 |
