= Alma Lilia Luna Munguía =

Mexican politician

- Born: 6 August 1976 (age 49); State of Mexico, Mexico
- Occupation: Politician
- Political party: Institutional Revolutionary Party

Alma Lilia Luna Munguía (born 6 August 1976) is a Mexican politician affiliated with the Institutional Revolutionary Party (PRI). She has served two terms in the Chamber of Deputies representing the 32nd district of the State of Mexico, centered on Valle de Chalco Solidaridad.

== Life ==
As she pursued a law degree, Luna began her political career in the municipality of Valle de Chalco; she was a municipal technical secretary from 1997 to 1998 and worker her way up to various positions in the municipality, most recently, she was municipal secretary of Valle de Chalco from 2009 to 2012.

Her political career was marked by two party flips. She started in the PRI, participating in its campaigns for governor and municipal president. However, by 2003, she had flipped to the Party of the Democratic Revolution, and it was during her time in the PRD that she went to San Lázaro for the 32nd district for the first time, as a deputy in the 60th Congress. She was a secretary on the National Defense Commission and sat on others dealing with Hydraulic Resources, Transportation and Special on Non-Discrimination.

After her first term, Luna flipped back to the PRI, becoming a municipal political councilor in that party between 2009 and 2015. She also served as a coordinator in Valle de Chalco for the PRI's 2011 gubernatorial and 2012 presidential campaigns.

In 2015, voters in the 32nd district returned Luna to the Chamber of Deputies for the 63rd Congress. She serves on the Cooperative Stimulus and Social Economy, Culture and Film, and Human Rights Commissions.

== Personal ==
Alma's brother, Miguel Ángel Luna Munguía, also represented Chalco in the Chamber of Deputies, under the PRI banner during the 61st Congress. He was running against Alma as the PRD candidate when he was killed in his campaign office on 2 June 2015, just days before the election.
