= Taho (disambiguation) =

Taho or TAHO may refer to:

- Taho, a Philippine snack food
- Tahoe Resources (stock ticker symbol: TAHO)
- Tasmanian Archive and Heritage Office
- Taho, an abbreviation for Lake Tahoe in disc golf
- Taho Web3 Wallet
