= Glamis (disambiguation) =

Glamis is a village in Scotland.

Glamis may also refer to:

- Glamis, California, United States, an unincorporated community and former Southern Pacific railroad stop
- Glamis Castle, Glamis, Scotland
- Glamis Gold, an American former gold producer company
- Lord Glamis, a subsidiary title of the Earl of Strathmore and Kinghorne
