= Salvador Castaneda =

Salvador Castaneda or Castañeda may refer to:

- Salvador Castañeda Álvarez (1946–2026), Mexican writer
- Salvador Castaneda Castro (1888–1965), president of El Salvador from 1945 to 1948
- Salvador Castañeda O'Connor (1931–2019), Mexican politician, Unified Socialist Party of Mexico (PSUM)
- Salvador Castañeda Salcedo (born 1957), Mexican politician
