= Escobal mine protests =

Protests against the Escobal silver mine in Guatemala

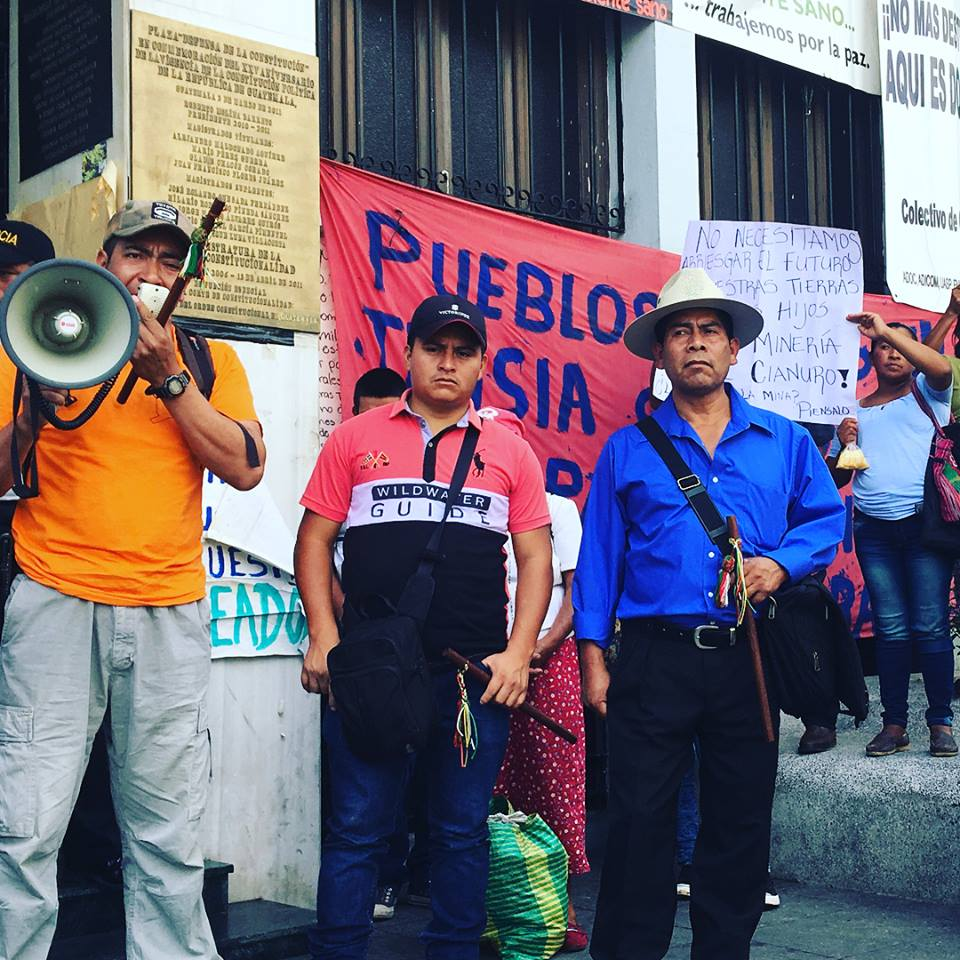
Protesters in front of Guatemala's Constitutional Court in 2018

The Escobal mine protests are a series of political protests opposing the Escobal mine, a large silver mine developed by Canadian mining company Tahoe Resources in San Rafael Las Flores, Guatemala. Since 2009, various community groups, such as the Xinca people have advocated against the mine, citing risks of environmental damage and the land sovereignty rights of the indigenous Xinca people. These groups have employed nonviolent protest tactics such as blockading mine property and voting in municipal referendums, which found that over 95% of residents in surrounding communities opposed the Escobal mine.

The protests have been met with systematic violence from both state forces and Escobal's private security, including shootings, kidnappings, and an official state of siege declared in May 2013 to suppress public opposition. Escobal opened in 2014 and operated for three years before Tahoe's mining license was suspended by a Guatemalan court for failing to adequately consult with Xinca communities in the area. Several years after the height of the protest, there is still tension. Indigenous leaders have faced arrest, and criminal and civil litigation over attacks on protestoers continues. In the face of this, there have been international expressions of solidarity from other groups, such as the Union of British Columbia Indian Chiefs.

== Background ==
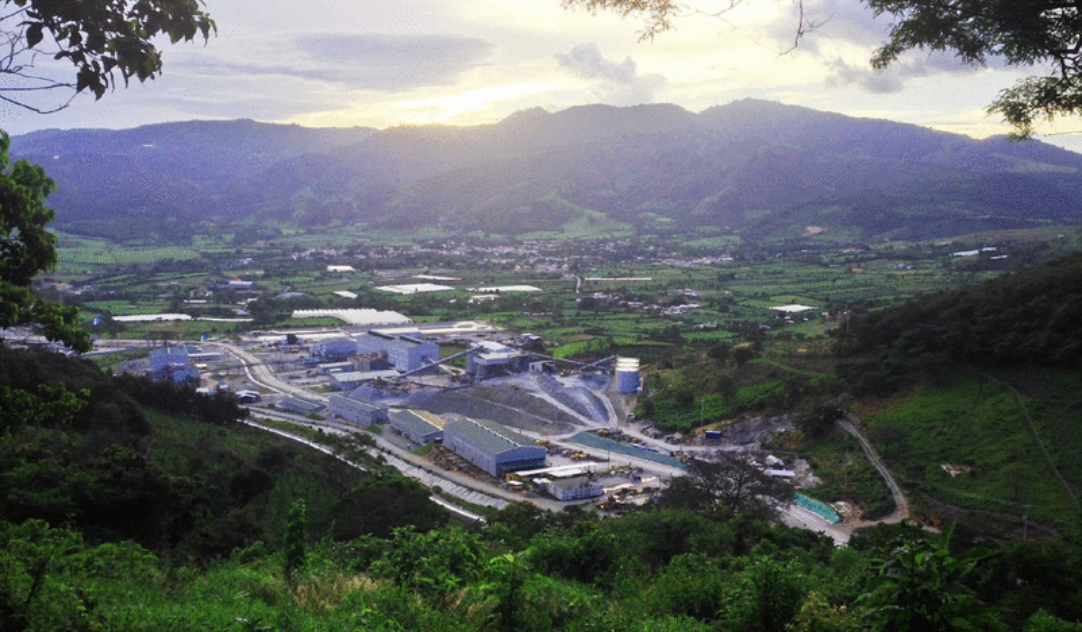
Aerial view of the Escobal mine

The Escobal mine is a silver mine in the municipality of San Rafael Las Flores, in the Santa Rosa Department of Guatemala. Its exploitation license was approved in April 2013 and it began operation in January 2014, continuing for three years. Shortly before the exploitation license was granted, the Guatemalan National Security Commission declared the mine a "strategic national resource" in an effort to bypass community opposition. It is the second largest silver mine in the world, producing a record 21.3 million ounces of silver in 2016.

Escobal was developed by Canadian mining company Tahoe Resources and its Guatemalan subsidiary Minera San Rafael. Tahoe was in turn created by former executives of (and owned in large part by) previous mining companies such as Goldcorp and Glamis Gold that had already faced opposition in the region, which shaped the community's reaction to the Escobal project. Substantial local capital has also been invested in the mine, including a legal entity composed of twenty-nine Guatemalans as well as a group of local landowners Tahoe has informally turned into shareholders.

=== Militarization ===
Since 1998, the surrounding region has seen a drastically increased presence of foreign mining and a corresponding increase in militarization, both state and private. Even with these changes, local elites have maintained significant sway over mining projects. Violence in service of resource extraction has become the norm, serving as a core task of Guatemala's armed forces and a major basis for the country's economy. In particular large mining companies in the area rely heavily on private security, with every mine hiring at least one security firm. To plan and coordinate security for the Escobal mine, Tahoe contracted with International Security and Defense Management, a U.S.-based company specializing in military training, intelligence, and counterintelligence. For security at the mine itself, in 2011 they hired Alfa Uno, a local affiliate of Israeli private security firm Golan Group — which had a prior reputation for human rights abuses.

This same time period has seen intensifying conflicts between Canadian mining companies and vulnerable communities across the world. Forty percent of mining companies in Latin America are based in Canada, constituting over 1,500 separate projects. One estimate found that in the early 2010s conflicts over Canadian mining projects in Latin America were responsible for approximately 50 deaths and 300 injuries.

=== Environmental damage ===
Mining in Guatemala has also contributed to widespread environmental devastation. Guatemala's Ministry of the Environment and Natural Resources (MARN) requires that mining companies conduct an Environmental and Social Impact Assessment (ESIA) to identify and address any negative effects on the surrounding area, but there is little legal infrastructure for oversight and enforcement. The approval rate of ESIAs is over 90%, and a source at MARN reports high pressure to quickly approve ESIAs without adequate resources to evaluate them. Companies ultimately create their own Corporate Social Responsibility plans without community input.

== Xinca people ==
The region surrounding the Escobal mine is home to the indigenous Xinca people. The Xinca people have longstanding roots in Guatemala, and their settlement can be traced back before that of the Maya and Nahua groups. The Xinca people were officially recognized as a distinct ethnic identity under the 1995 Agreement on Identity and Rights of Indigenous People. This agreement established core rights of the Xinca, including the ability to maintain their own language and spiritual practices, govern their own lands, and be legally protected from discrimination. There has been a long history of displacement and genocide of indigenous people in Guatemala, as well as historical practices that identified indigenous groups on the basis of language and clothing in ways that failed to recognize indigenous people in southeastern regions of the country.

Mining is a major threat to indigenous land rights in San Rafael Las Flores and the surrounding area. Before a large extraction site like the Escobal mine can be developed in Guatemala, the International Labour Organization’s Indigenous and Tribal Peoples Convention (ILO) 169 requires consultation with indigenous people living in the region. The Guatemalan government, however, has been in broad violation of these requirements, and has systematically failed to obtain free, prior, and informed consent from indigenous communities before allowing projects to proceed.

In particular, the Escobal mine project was begun without the required consultation with the Xinca, and has been deficient in its compliance with ESIA requirements. This was criticized in a report by the United Nations General Assembly on racism and violation of indigenous rights in Guatemala, which found evidence of failure to consult with the Xinca, denial of their identity, and criminalization of their attempts to protest. Minera San Rafael flatly denied the existence of the Xinca, releasing radio spots claiming "the Xinca people do not exist." In contrast, a total of 264,167 individuals identified themselves as Xinca in Guatemala's 2018 census.

== Protests ==
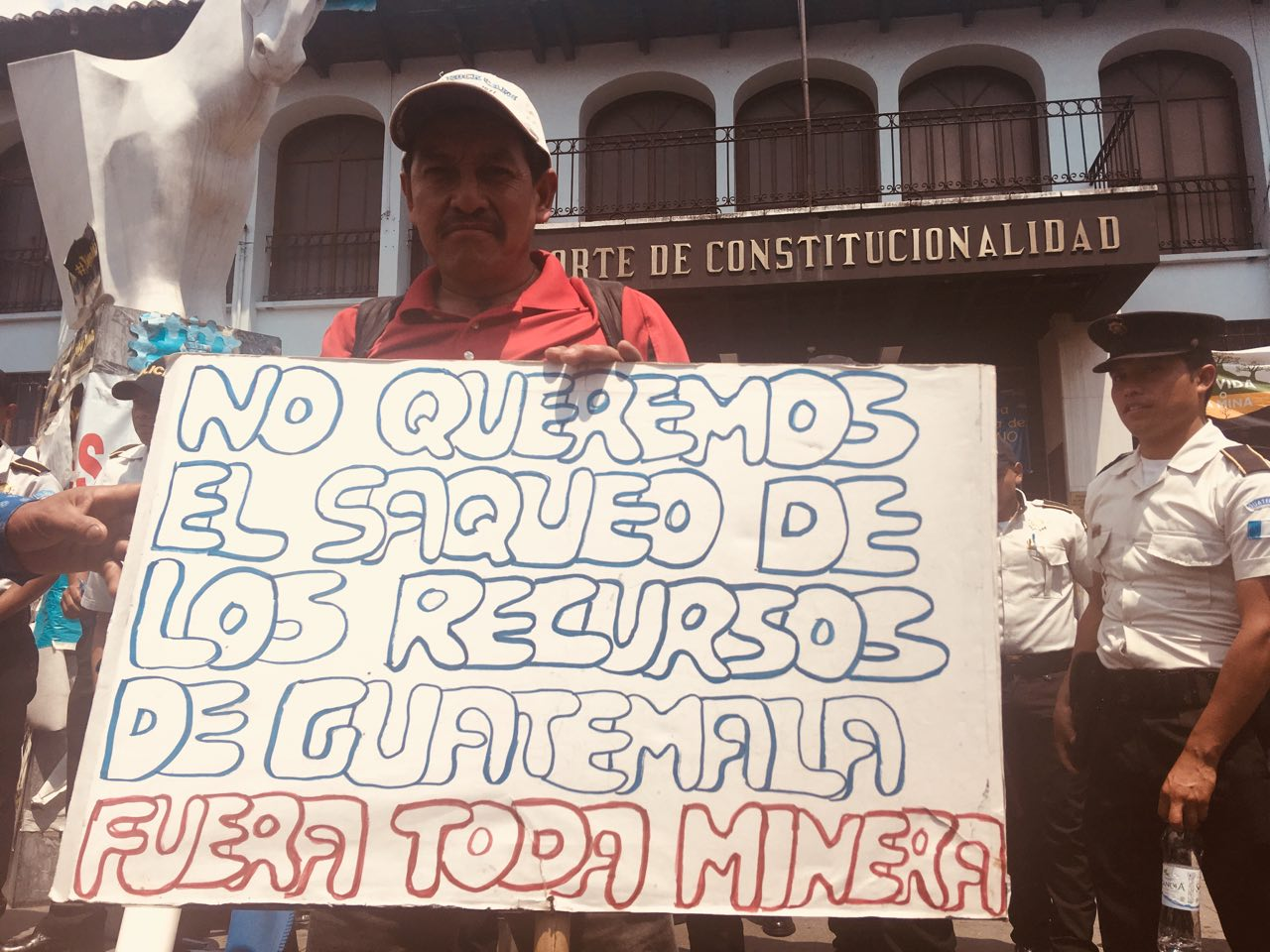
Escobal protester holding an anti-mining sign

Communities around the Escobal mine have been protesting it since 2009, with a substantial increase in activity between 2011 and 2013. Protests especially escalated in July 2013 when more local residents took a stand against the project. The opposition movement has involved a wide range of individuals and organizations: indigenous and non-indigenous, religious and secular, spanning thirty communities, ten municipalities, and three departments in Guatemala. These include the CDP, Communitarian Councils for Development (COCODEs), the Diocese Commission for the Defense of Nature (CODIDENA), the Parliament of the Xinca People of Guatemala (PAPXIGUA), the Peaceful Resistance in Casillas, and three local mayors. Escobal has been criticized on a national and international scale. Still, the ability of opposition groups to form into a cohesive national movement has been limited.

Protesters have challenged the mine on the basis of its environmental impact, the threats posed to human health and well-being, and the legitimacy of the company's right to build on the land without proper consultations. Long-term demands have included decentralized environmental governance, more meaningful democratic representation, and respect for collective land use rights.

Activists have employed a range of nonviolent protest tactics, including not only public marches and demonstrations, but also using their bodies to form a blockade that prevents access to mine infrastructure and disrupts the routines of mine employees. The blockades in particular have served to draw attention and support from other activist movements, both domestically and abroad. Opponents have also pursued litigation against the mine, sometimes with the support of international NGOs.

The protests have been characterized as persistently peaceful, with a few exceptions. In 2012, attacks against mine security were reported, with protest organizers denying involvement. At the end of 2012 a store and police car were burned. In January 2013, clashes between protesters and miners left three dead and two injured, including two of the mine's security guards. Meanwhile, the Guatemalan Public Ministry identified an espionage network linked to both Escobal's private security and the National Civil Police that surveilled the opposition to the mine and planted false activists in the movement, including one who was on trial for killing a police officer at the time of the discovery.

=== Consultas ===
As of 2013, governments of five municipalities near Escobal had held consultas (referendums), in which over 50,000 residents participated and over 95% voted in opposition the mine. The Consultas consisted of four of the five municipalities and nine communities which voted directly on the mining project.

On April 29, mayors of these municipalities thus refused to sign a deal with mining companies coordinated by the Guatemalan government. In seven more municipalities that refused to hold official consultas, votes were organized anyway through the COCODEs, and the populations likewise voted overwhelmingly against the mine.

These votes have been used not only as legal mechanisms but also as forums for mobilizing popular resistance to the mine, a new form of grassroots activism that has changed the landscape of political movements in Guatemala. Widespread consultas have allowed individuals who do not identify as indigenous, or who do not live directly adjacent to the mine, to nonetheless express their opposition and demand an opportunity for democratic participation.

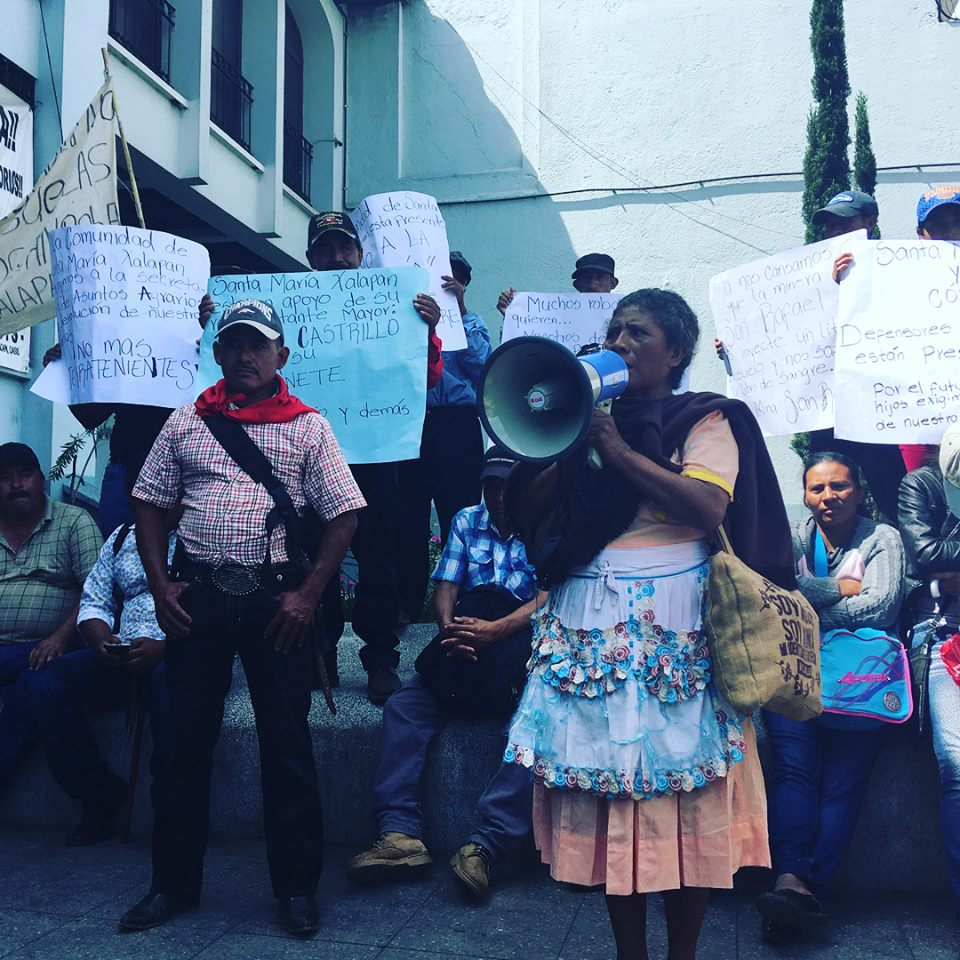
Woman speaking at a protest against Escobal

=== Specific demographics ===
Xinca activists have played a central role in protests against the mine, using the movement to reaffirm their identity and political autonomy, exercise sovereignty over their land, and build up collaborative institutions. Their stated aims in this movement include not just defense of physical space, but establishing a broader program of self-governance for the Xinca people.

==== Women ====
Women have likewise held a prominent position, in most regions serving leadership roles or making up the majority of the movement — although they often have access to fewer resources than men, so their interests tend to be deprioritized. They generally participate on an equal footing with male activists, taking part in strategy, marches, blockades, and legal action. Some female protesters even use their bodies as shields to protect against violence from state forces. Many women in the movement refer to themselves as "defenders of life," working to highlight the threat that environmental damage from mining will pose to human health. Xinca women in particular have emphasized the ways in which land sovereignty and bodily autonomy are intertwined, using the slogan "If they touch our earth they touch our blood, if they touch our blood they touch our earth."

Mining has harmful environmental effects on both the women and future generations in the region. Birth defects during pregnancy have been reported, highlighting the harm mining plays on future generations.

The environmental impacts produced by mining have also affected food availability and land productivity. Water shortages have led to a reduction in crops, and this reduction has led to an added stressor to some women in the region, as they are not only worried about feeding themselves, but also their children. This, coupled with a lack of employment and opportunities, has led women in the region to prostitution as a source of fast cash. Mining provides fast cash as a solution to this; however, when men use the fast cash to hire prostitutes instead of on resources for the family, the cycle of social disarray reinforces itself.

Though Mining provides a solution to the financial needs of the area, its presence also causes rising social tensions and inequalities. A group of indigenous women in Guatemala took action to sue Canadian mining company Hudbay Minerals for alleged human rights violations, including rape and sexual assault. In October 2024, a mutually agreed settlement was reached with all three plaintiffs.

Women have raised awareness and engaged in activism against mining through collective action. In these groups, solidarity is built through shared experiences of harm at the hands of these mines. These groups have also engaged in consciousness-raising efforts by reinforcing the idea of collective experiences; that is, the idea that the suffering endured as a result of mining is shared by all women in the community. These groups intend to highlight the interconnectedness of women to the region and empower them to take collective action against mining.

== Violence against protesters ==
The use of force against Escobal mine protesters has not been random or sporadic. Rather, it is the result of a coordinated and systematic effort on behalf of the Guatemalan police, the military, the mine's private security, paramilitary groups, organized crime, and traditional economic elites to deploy extreme violence targeted at those resisting the mine, because of their resistance and for the purpose of suppressing it. This violence has taken the form of intimidation, death threats, arrests, political imprisonment, kidnapping, sexual assault, assassinations, attempted assassinations, and mass shootings. It has been facilitated by broad militarization, a state of siege, orders of capture, surveillance of civilians, intelligence and counterintelligence strategies, and widespread violations of human rights.

Tahoe's private security company Golan Group has surveilled citizens who speak out against the Escobal mine and reported them to the police for arrests. The Guatemalan police have arrested over 90 community members in the course of this conflict, including mass arrests of 32 people at peaceful protests against the Escobal mine. At least five advocates against the mine have been assassinated.

=== Before April 2013 ===
In 2012, Guatemalan president Otto Pérez Molina ordered the creation of five new military bases specifically in regions that had been resistant to mining. In particular, a military post was placed in the Xinca community of Santa Maria Xalapán in Jalapa to keep it under surveillance.

That same year protesters report that, while peacefully demonstrating against the mine's construction of a high-voltage line, they were violently attacked by "members of the company's private security detail equipped with anti-riot gear, attack dogs, tear gas launchers, and rubber bullet guns, and accompanied by members of the National Civil Police," followed later by army helicopters flying overhead, employing wartime intimidation tactics.

On March 17, 2013, four leaders in the Xinca Parliament who protested the mine – Rigoberto Aguilar, Roberto González, Roberto López, and Exaltación Marcos Ucelo – were kidnapped by unidentified hitmen, and Ucelo was murdered in their custody.

=== April 2013 shooting ===
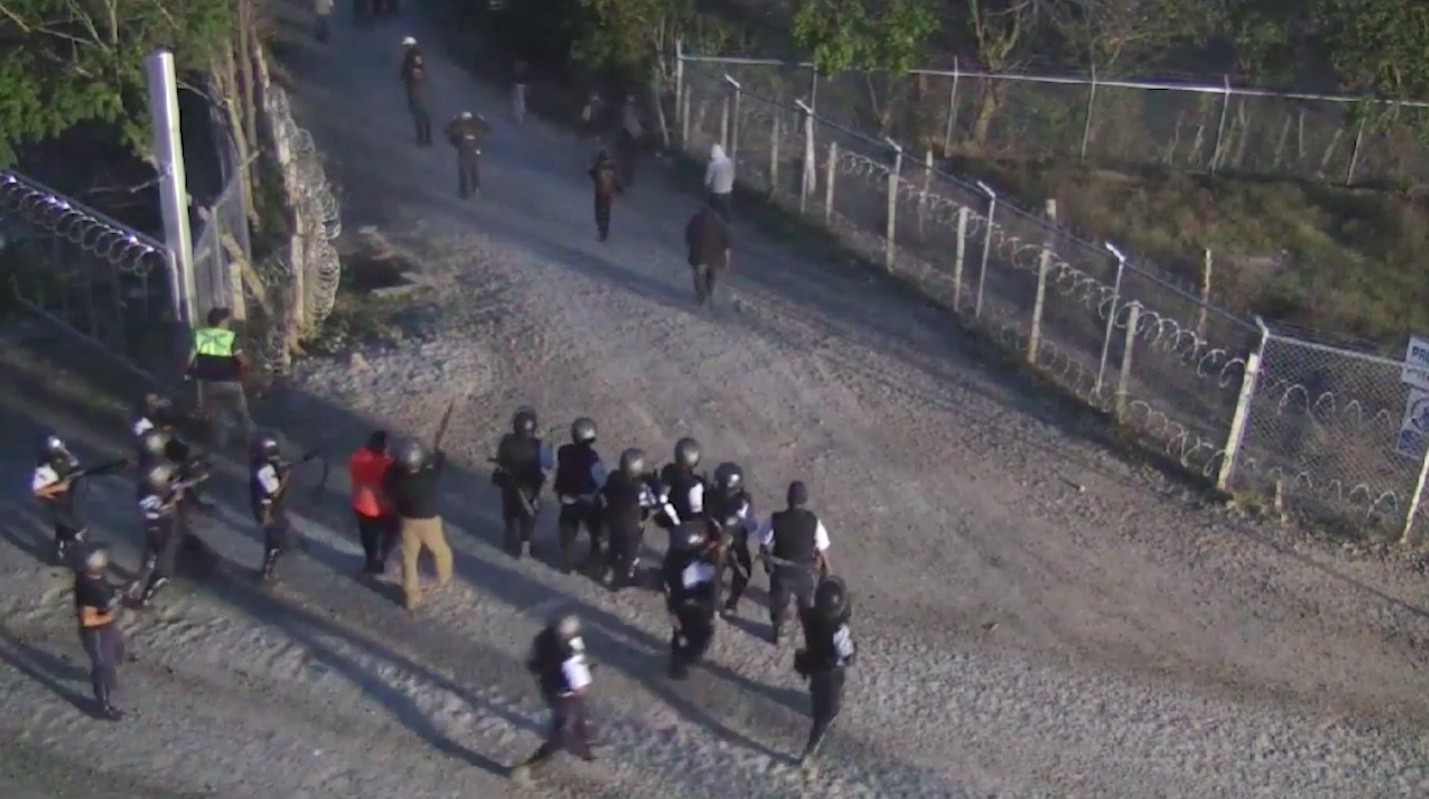
Security camera image of guards shooting at protesters outside Escobal

On April 27, 2013, Escobal's head of security Alberto Rotondo ordered his team to attack a group of twenty indigenous civilians and peaceful protesters standing in front of the mine. The guards fired into the crowd, wounding at least six people. The attack was carried out by Tahoe's contracted private security company Golan Group, specifically its local affiliate Alfa Uno.

Following the attack misinformation was spread about what took place: the Guatemalan Ministry of the Interior falsely claimed that firearms had not been used against the population, and a pro-mining television channel falsely claimed that protesters had attacked unarmed miners.

Rotondo's phone had been wiretapped by Guatemala's Public Ministry as part of a separate investigation, and recordings were released of communications between Rotondo and the company's public relations consultant, as well as other employees. These recordings purport to show him ordering the shooting of protesters and subsequent destruction of evidence, featuring lines such as "we’ve got to get those piece-of-shit animals off the road," "goddamned dogs don’t realize that mining creates jobs," and "just kill the sons of bitches!"

=== State of siege ===
On May 1, 2013, President Pérez declared a 30-day state of siege in four municipalities near Escobal — Casillas, Jalapa, Mataquescuintla, and San Rafael Las Flores — to suppress protests against the mine. This declaration came just two days after the mayors of three of those municipalities refused to sign a voluntary agreement with Tahoe Resources. Pérez initially claimed the state of siege was directed against organized crime, but months later he admitted, along with the Minister of Energy and Mines and the Minister of the Interior, that it had always been intended to control opposition to the Escobal mine.

The state of siege created militarized zones of martial law where constitutional rights were severely restricted, including rights to protest and public assembly as well as rights to freedom of movement. The Guatemalan government sent a total of over 3,000 soldiers and police to the four municipalities, as well as tanks and armored cars equipped with anti-craft guns. They occupied towns, set up blockades, and were authorized to perform otherwise illegal searches and seizures as well as detain citizens indefinitely without charge or trial. The state of siege was never authorized by the Guatemalan congress.

During this state of siege, Escobal's private security gave prosecutors documents naming six people behind the protests, which were used to justify arresting and imprisoning them. The security team also coordinated with the government in efforts to undermine the reputation of Catholic priests that had opposed the project.

=== After siege ===
In April 2014, indigenous 16-year-old Topacio Reynoso, who led a youth organization resisting the mine, was murdered by unidentified hitmen. Her father Alex Reynoso was also shot, but survived. In October 2015, Alex Reynoso was shot again along with three others, all of whom survived.

Since 2015, Special Reserve Security Squads constituting 4,500 additional police have been sent to patrol indigenous communities that have expressed opposition to mining.

On July 12, 2018, indigenous anti-mining activist Ángel Estuardo Quevedo was murdered in Santa Rosa. He was a member of the Peaceful Resistance in Casillas.

In February 2019, the Escobal mine was purchased by Canadian mining conglomerate Pan American Silver. The company subsequently began the formal process to reopen the mine.

In 2023, an unnamed prominent leader against the mine was allegedly killed according to the President of the Xinca Commission of Women, Marisol Guerra. Guerra also alleges that many other Xinca leaders live in exile outside of Guatemala.

== Legal proceedings ==
On June 18, 2014, seven indigenous residents of San Rafael Las Flores filed a civil lawsuit against Tahoe Resources in the Supreme Court of British Columbia, alleging battery and negligence in authorizing or allowing its security team to use excessive force against them in the April 2013 shootings. The Court held that the case could not proceed because the appropriate venue was in fact Guatemala, but the appellate court overturned the decision, setting precedent for Canadian companies to be held liable in Canada for violence committed by subsidiaries overseas.

Security chief and former military officer Alberto Rotondo has faced criminal charges in Guatemala for his role in ordering the shootings. He was arrested attempting to flee the country and placed under house arrest as he awaited trial, but he escaped and returned to his nation of origin, Peru. There he was found by Interpol, but the process to extradite him back to Guatemala was still ongoing as of 2017.

In 2017, The Constitutional Court of Guatemala suspended Tahoe's exploration license for the Escobal mine on the basis that there had not been meaningful consultation with Xinca communities. The court ruled that Tahoe had to complete an ILO 169 consultation – a convention of the United Nations International Labor Organization regarding the right to consultation with Indigenous and Tribal Peoples in decisions that affect their communities – with the Xinca before mining could resume. This decision was upheld in 2018, with the Constitutional Court ruling in September that the suspension would remain in place until consultation had been completed.

In 2019, Tahoe Resources Inc was bought by Pan American Silver, with the transaction seeing the latter assume responsibility of the Escobal mine and the Constitutional Court ruling.

In 2022, Pan American Silver announced that the consultation process outlined by the Constitutional Court of Guatemala was entering Phase 2 of 3, marking a step towards the potential re-opening of the mine.

On May 8, 2025, the Xinca Parliament held a press conference where they formally denied consent for the restart of operations at Escobal and reiterated that their decision must be respected by Pan American Silver and the Guatemalan government in accordance with the Constitutional Court’s 2017 ruling.

== Response of foreign governments ==
Throughout the conflict, the Canadian government has maintained close collaboration with Tahoe Resources and Minera San Rafael. Emails reference private meetings between company representatives and Canadian embassy staff concerning issues of security at the Escobal mine — the contents of which the embassy has failed to transparently disclose. Meanwhile, the Canadian government has not taken any concrete action to stop human rights abuses against protesters in San Rafael Las Flores, which researcher Caren Weisbart calls "a critical failure to intervene in crimes of the powerful."

In 2017, the United States government called for Guatemalan courts to renew Tahoe's suspended mining license. Tahoe has had strong ties to the U.S., including multiple U.S. executives.

On May 28, 2025, the Xinca Parliament issued a joint statement with the Union of B.C. Indian Chiefs urging Pan American Silver and the Canadian government to respect the Xinca’s call to permanently close the Escobal mine in compliance with the UN Declaration on the Rights of Indigenous Peoples.
