= 2015 Mexican legislative election =

- 7 June 2015
- All 500 seats in the Chamber of Deputies; 251 seats needed for a majority
- Turnout: 47.72%
Party	Leader	Vote %	Seats	+/–
PRI	César Camacho Quiroz	30.65	203	−4
PAN	Marko Antonio Cortés Mendoza	22.07	109	−5
PRD	Francisco Martínez Neri	11.47	55	−45
MORENA	Rocío Nahle García	8.81	35	New
PVEM	Jesús Sesma Suárez	7.26	47	+13
MC	Dante Delgado Rannauro	6.40	25	+9
PNA	Luis Alfredo Valles Mendoza	3.92	11	+1
PES	Alejandro González Murillo	3.49	8	New
PT	Alberto Anaya Gutiérrez	2.99	6	−13
Independents	–	0.59	1	New
This lists parties that won seats. See the complete results below.
Results by constituency

Legislative elections were held in Mexico on 7 June 2015, alongside municipal elections.

== Background ==
Traditionally elections had taken place on the first Sunday of July, but in 2015 were set to the first Sunday of June.

== Electoral system ==
The 500 members of the Chamber of Deputies were elected by two methods; 300 were elected in single-member constituencies and 200 by proportional representation in a single nationwide constituency. Constitutional reforms in 2014 led to the creation of the National Electoral Institute, replacing the Federal Electoral Institute.

== Conduct ==
There were around 22 reported killings across the country, possibly involving campaign coordinators, precandidates and candidates. Notable cases included the 2 June campaign of Miguel Ángel Luna Munguía, the Party of the Democratic Revolution (PRD) candidate for federal deputy in the state of Mexico, and the 27 May campaign of Israel Hernández Fabela, the PRI candidate for local representative for the Federal District's campaign coordinator.

In certain parts of the country that had already experienced significant governance issues, the atmosphere before the elections was even more tense and violent. The states of Oaxaca, Michoacán, Jalisco and Guerrero were notable among them. Since drug trafficking organizations and other organized crime elements control significant regions, the state security forces stationed there engage in activities and operations that create extremely dangerous and unique situations for citizens, like the violent clashes with the Jalisco Nueva Generación Cartel that occurred in Jalisco at the beginning of May. The cartel demonstrated significant firepower, shooting down a Cougar helicopter of the Mexican Army, in which nine troops died, mostly members of the special forces and the Federal Police.

Violent attacks occurring before the 2015 elections included:

- In the municipality of Tixtla, Guerrero, riots occurred in protest of the disappearance of 43 students from a rural school in the town of Ayotzinapa. After the burning of more than 20% of the polling stations, the elections in the municipality were declared annulled, leaving the votes for state governor, federal and local deputies outside the official count and the municipal mayoral election annulled.
- In the state of Michoacán and Tabasco, blockades were reported in the municipalities of Nahuatzen, Cherán, Amacuzac and Villahermosa where some of the facilities where the polling stations were going to be installed were blocked.
- in Jiutepec, Morelos, homemade bombs were thrown at an urn, causing two injuries.
- Attack on Rosendo Cruz, candidate from the National Action Party for federal deputy for the district of Tula de Allende (June 6, 2015).
- Attack on the headquarters of the Institutional Revolutionary Party in Matamoros, Tamaulipas although there were no injuries (June 6, 2015).
- Murder of PRD candidate Aidé Nava González for mayor of Ahuacuotzingo, Guerrero (March 10).
- Murder of Ulises Fabián Quiróz, candidate in Chilapa.
- Murder of candidate Enrique Hernández, candidate for mayor of Yurécuaro for Morena (May 14, 2015).
- Murder of 4 people from the Nueva Alianza party in Ixcapuzalco.
- Murder of Miguel Ángel Luna candidate in Valle de Chalco.
- Murder of Héctor Cruz López, PRI militant for councilor in Huimanguillo (May 14).

Protocol to Address Political Violence against women

The challenges that women face in exercising their political and electoral rights arose from the violent circumstances surrounding the 2015 election cycle. To that end, the Protocol was signed in conjunction with a number of institutions, including FEPADE, the Court Electoral of the Judicial Branch of the Federation, the Executive Commission for Attention to Victims and the National Institute for Women, among others, with the goal of fostering equality, non-discrimination and non-violence in political and electoral spaces, as well as the appropriate exercise of political and electoral rights by women.

== Opinion polls ==
Date	Pollster	PRI	PAN	PRD	PVEM	PT	PANAL	MC	Morena	PH	PES	Undeclared	Lead
3 Jun 2015	Buendía & Laredo	28.8	24.7	11.7	9.2	4.1	2.8	4.7	8.8	1.5	2.4	32.0	4.1
3 Jun 2015	BGC–Excélsior	32.0	26.0	13.0	9.0	2.0	3.0	4.0	9.0	1.0	1.0	24.9	6.0
2 Jun 2015	Parametría	31.0	25.0	11.0	8.0	2.0	4.0	6.0	9.0	2.0	2.0		6.0
2 Jun 2015	Mitofsky	32.0	23.9	17.2	5.9	2.8	3.1	3.9	9.8	0.6	0.7	29.0	8.1
30 Mar 2015	Reforma	32.0	22.0	14.0	7.0	2.0	4.0	3.0	8.0	2.0	4.0		10.0
20–22 Feb 2015	Mitofsky	31.0	26.0	16.0	8.0	3.0	2.0	3.0	9.0	1.0	1.0	37.4	5.0
12–18 Feb 2015	Buendía & Laredo	30.0	26.0	13.0	11.0	3.0	3.0	2.0	9.0	1.0	1.0	—	4.0
10–15 Jan 2015	Parametría	31.0	27.0	12.0	10.0	2.0	3.0	3.0	10.0	1.0	1.0	—	4.0
1 Jul 2012	Federal election	31.9	25.9	18.5	6.1	4.6	4.1	4.0	—	—	—	—	6.0

== Results ==
Party	Party-list			Constituency			Total seats	+/–
Party	Votes	%	Seats	Votes	%	Seats	Total seats	+/–
Institutional Revolutionary Party	11,636,957	30.65	48	11,575,381	30.70	155	203	–4
National Action Party	8,377,535	22.07	53	8,328,125	22.09	56	109	–5
Party of the Democratic Revolution	4,335,321	11.42	27	4,293,411	11.39	28	55	–45
Morena	3,345,712	8.81	21	3,304,736	8.76	14	35	New
Ecologist Green Party of Mexico	2,757,170	7.26	18	2,740,208	7.27	29	47	+13
Citizens' Movement	2,431,063	6.40	15	2,412,817	6.40	10	25	+9
New Alliance Party	1,486,626	3.92	10	1,475,423	3.91	1	11	+1
Social Encounter Party	1,325,032	3.49	8	1,310,539	3.48	0	8	New
Labor Party	1,134,101	2.99	0	1,138,864	3.02	6	6	–13
Humanist Party	856,716	2.26	0	847,689	2.25	0	0	New
Independents	225,029	0.59	0	225,029	0.60	1	1	New
Non-registered candidates	52,371	0.14	0	51,599	0.14	0	0	0
Total	37,963,633	100.00	200	37,703,821	100.00	300	500	0
Valid votes	37,963,633	95.23		37,703,821	95.25			
Invalid/blank votes	1,900,449	4.77		1,881,384	4.75			
Total votes	39,864,082	100.00		39,585,205	100.00			
Registered voters/turnout	83,536,377	47.72		83,536,377	47.39			
Source: Diario Oficial, Diario Oficial, Election Resources
