= Indigenous land rights =

Rights of indigenous people to customary land

Indigenous land rights are the rights of Indigenous peoples to land and natural resources therein, either individually or collectively, mostly in colonised countries. Land and resource-related rights are of fundamental importance to Indigenous peoples for a range of reasons, including: the religious significance of the land, self-determination, identity, and economic factors. Land is a major economic asset, and in some Indigenous societies, using natural resources of earth and sea form (or could form) the basis of their household economy, so the demand for ownership derives from the need to ensure their access to these resources. Land can also be an important instrument of inheritance or a symbol of social status. In many Indigenous societies, such as among the many Aboriginal Australian peoples, the land is an essential part of their spirituality and belief systems.

Indigenous land claims have been addressed with varying degrees of success on the national and international level since the very beginning of colonization. Such claims may be based upon the principles of international law, treaties, common law, or domestic constitutions or legislation. Aboriginal title (also known as Indigenous title, native title and other terms) is a common law doctrine that the land rights of indigenous peoples to customary tenure persist after the assumption of sovereignty under settler colonialism. The United Nations Declaration on the Rights of Indigenous Peoples, passed by the UN General Assembly in 2007, illustrates the importance of land for Indigenous peoples and offers benchmark standards on the land rights of indigenous people. Statutory recognition and protection of Indigenous and community land rights continues to be a major challenge, with the gap between formally recognised and customarily held and managed land is a significant source of underdevelopment, conflict, and environmental degradation.

== International law ==
The foundational documents for Indigenous land rights in international law include the Indigenous and Tribal Peoples Convention, 1989 ("ILO 169"), the United Nations Declaration on the Rights of Indigenous Peoples, the Convention on the Elimination of All Forms of Racial Discrimination, the International Covenant on Civil and Political Rights, the American Convention on Human Rights, and the American Declaration on the Rights of Indigenous Peoples.

== Common law ==
Aboriginal title, also known as native title (Australia), customary title (New Zealand), original Indian title (US), is the common law doctrine that the land rights of indigenous peoples to customary tenure persist after the assumption of sovereignty. Indigenous peoples may also have certain rights on Crown land in many jurisdictions.

=== Australia ===
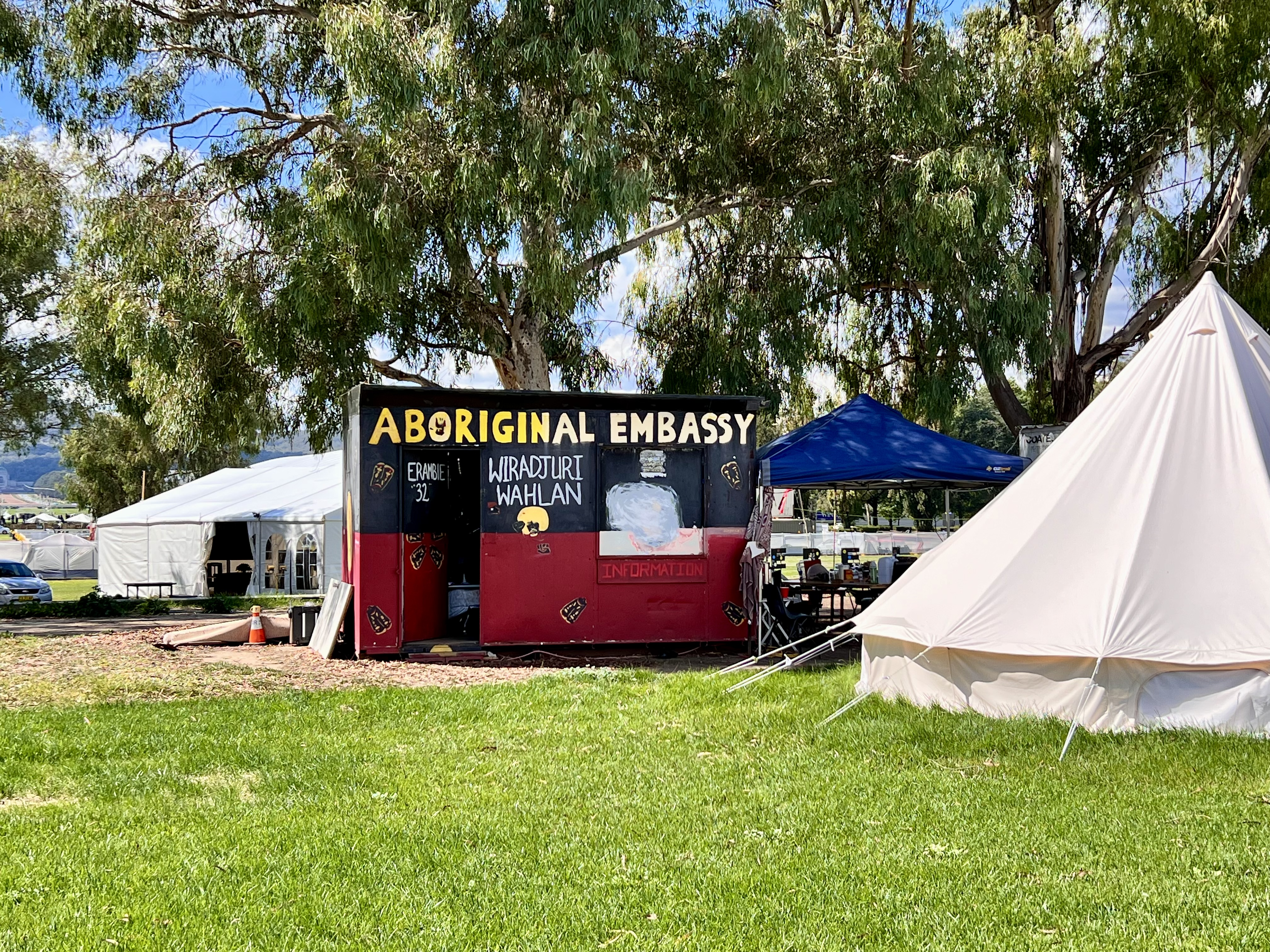
Aboriginal Tent Embassy in Canberra, the longest continuous protest for indigenous land rights in the world

Indigenous land rights have historically been undermined by a variety of doctrines such as terra nullius. which is a Latin term meaning "land belonging to no one" In 1971, a group of Meriam people in Australia issued a legal claim for their ownership of their island of Mer in the Torres Strait. In their legal claim they issued that their land is inherently and exclusively owned, lived and governed by Meriam people, where they historically managed its political and social issues. After years of the case being heard by the legal courts, and after the death of one of the plaintiffs (Eddie Mabo), the High Court's judgement issued a recognition of the native's ownership to land and the denial of the myth of the terra nullius.

=== Canada ===
As Canada's constitution, as belonging to Canada and not Great Britain, is relatively new, the First Nations have been able to advocate for their rights in the constitution itself. First Nation leader George Manuel's Constitution Express idea is a notable attribute to the Aboriginal Rights Movement, among other actions taken by the nations. The Canadian government responded to the nations' advocacy with what came to be referred to as the "White Paper." This document, published in 1969, outlined 5 doctrines that left many indigenous leaders unsatisfied, sparking a meeting of the Indian Association of Alberta the next year. At this meeting, "The Red Paper" (entitled "Citizen Plus") was issued, in which the indigenous perspective was outlined. Of the points outlined, land rights are a large part. The period that followed was an important one for the future of the First Nations and their rights. As state by Arthur Manuel, son of George Manuel,

It was during this period that the national Indian movement began to take shape and to draw on its greatest resource, the First Nations people from across Canada who saw the National Indian Brotherhood as a vehicle they could use to push the federal government for a just settlement on a range of self-government, land title and treaty issues.

The leading case for Aboriginal title in Canada is Delgamuukw v. British Columbia (1997). This case was a milestone for First Nation land rights. It legitimized oral testimony and proved the nations in British Columbia had land rights unaffected by colonization. However, it did not declare title. The first case to do so in Canada was the Tsilhqot'in Nation v. British Columbia (2014). In this case, the Supreme Court of Canada confirmed the aboriginal title of the Tsilhqot'in Nation.

=== Japan ===
Ever since the Ainu were recognised as the indigenous people of Japan in 2019, the Ainu have been able to apply for special land rights if requested. The Ainu Promotion Act 2019 specifically lists special rights over "national parks, rivers and trademarks to preserve Ainu culture".

=== Latin America ===
As the political systems of some Latin American countries are now becoming more democratic and open to listening and embracing the views of minorities these issues of land rights have clearly come up to the surface of the political life. Despite this new "re-recognition" bit by bit, the indigenous groups are still among the poorest populations of the countries and they often have less access to resources and they have lesser opportunities for progress and development. The legal situation of Indigenous land rights in the countries of Latin America is highly varied. There is still a very broad variation of Indigenous rights, laws and recognition throughout the whole continent. In the year 1957, the International Labour Organization(ILO), made the ILO Convention 107. This convention created laws and norms for the protection and integration of Indigenous peoples in independent countries. All the independent countries of Latin America and the Caribbean of that time ratified this convention. Since the 1960s they started with the recognition of the first Indigenous land claims since the colonial era. In the year 1989 the ILO made the Convention 169; the convention concerning Indigenous and Tribal Peoples in Independent Countries, which updates the ILO 107 of 1957. In this convention was also the recognition of the very close and important relationship between land and identity, or cultural identity very important. Today, this convention has been ratified by 15 Latin American and Caribbean countries. Even in countries where it has been ratified, limited implementation has led to conflicts over indigenous land rights such as the Escobal mine protests in Guatemala, protection of Yasuní Oil in Ecuador, and the conflict between the Saramaka and Suriname—to name a few.

=== New Zealand ===
Indigenous land rights were recognised in the 1840 Treaty of Waitangi made between the British Crown and various Māori chiefs. The Treaty is riddled with translational errors that places more power in the hands of the Crown in one translation and the Māori people in another. In the context of land rights, the Māori text allowed for the Māori to retain ownership of prized possessions such as lands and forests for as long as they wished. Despite this, the Crown repeatedly breached the Treaty, with violations dating back to the 1840s. Famously, the Native Land Court was established after the Treaty as a governmental body that was to provide a way in which lands in Māori customary ownership could be converted to Crown-granted freeholds, a direct breach to the Treaty. Unrest between the Māori and the Crown continued into the 19th and 20th centuries, including a series of wars detailed in a book called The New Zealand Wars.

While the Treaty itself has often been ignored according to historians, in 1975—as the fulfillment of a political promise—the New Zealand government established the Waitangi Tribunal. The Tribunal was established as a commission to monitor the Court, ensuring there would be no breaches of the Treaty from then onward. The establishment of the Tribunal is a landmark in the rights of Māori people, both socially and in terms of land tenure.

By settling an allegation which they've agreed is justified, that the Crown breached the Treaty of Waitangi, they are enabling both the Crown and the Māori to get over that breakdown in the past Hon Justice Matthew Palmer, QC (2017)

Additionally, New Zealand courts have usually accepted the existence of native title. Controversies over Indigenous land rights have tended to revolve around the means by which Māori lost ownership, rather than whether they had ownership in the first place.

=== South Africa ===
South Africa has had a particularly publicized relationship between its settler community and the indigenous population. Beginning with the Native Land Act of 1913 (also known as the Banta Land Act or Black Land Act), the country was essentially divided along racial lines. The majority of the land was reserved for the white population although the black population, the Natives, made a majority of the county's overall population. The black South Africans were confined to reserves or Bantustans and could not purchase land outside of those areas. These areas were often arid and not suitable for agriculture which led to severe socio-economic consequences for the Native population. There are a variety of possible motives for passing this act, some of which include wanting to limit African squatters and encouragement from mining companies, although it is not known as to what the reason was.

The Act had profound and lasting effects on land ownership, access, and economic opportunities for black South Africans. It was one of the early legislative measures that institutionalized racial segregation, setting the stage for the more comprehensive apartheid policies that were implemented later in the 20th century. It was not until the Restitution of Land Rights Act of 1994 that the Native Land Act and other discriminatory legislation was addressed and attempted to be resolved. This new act set in place a process and identified who would qualify for the restitutions. The general history of South Africa is heavily tied to the governing body's relationship to its Native population.

=== United States ===
"Next to shooting indigenous peoples, the surest way to kill us is to separate us from our part of the Earth."

— Hayden Burgess, Hawaii

The foundational decision for Aboriginal title in the United States is Johnson v. McIntosh (1823), authored by Chief Justice John Marshall. Marshall's rulings are an important contributor to Native law and have been termed the Marshall Trilogy, referring to Johnson v. McIntosh (1823), Cherokee Nation v. Georgia (1831), and Worcester v. Georgia (1832).

In Johnson v. McIntosh, under the doctrine of discovery, it was ruled that Native Americans did not own their land, but rather had occupancy rights. Thus, Native Americans could not sale land unless it was to the United States. Cherokee Nation v. Georgia (1831) was another setback for Native rights, with a ruling that deduced the Cherokee Nation to a "dependent domestic nation" that was "under the sovereignty and dominion of the United States." A year later, however, in Worcester v. Georgia (1832) Marshall's language and view of the Cherokee nation changed significantly. In it, he referred to the Cherokee nation as a nation and acknowledged that treaties are formed between two sovereign states. In the years to follow, the Supreme Court has sometimes endorsed one viewpoint and at other times the other, as there is a big difference between the first two cases and the last.

In 1871, through the Appropriations Act of 1871, treaty making between different Native American tribes and the U.S. government ended. Although treaty-making had come to an end, previous treaty rights were to be followed still. The Supreme Court has faced considerable controversy in cases dealing with natural resource treaties. Native Americans in the United States have largely been relegated to Indian reservations managed by tribes under the United States Department of the Interior's Bureau of Indian Affairs. In the case, Winters v. United States (1908), it was established that reservations are to be prioritized rights to water over non-native use. Contested treaty cases have not always been ruled to the favor of Native Americans, however; an example is the United States v. Dion (1986) case.

== Civil law ==
=== Brazil ===
Indigenous land rights in Brazil is and has been an ongoing struggle for indigenous Brazilians; they have been treated as a minority group with no rights and are discriminated against. Discrimination against indigenous people has been present since colonisation. In 1910 the Indian Protection Service was created due to the large amounts of violence inflicted on indigenous people; however, this policy was ineffective and corrupt and was replaced by the National Indian Foundation in 1967. This policy worked to integrate indigenous people and effectively took their land so the government could prosper from its resources. In 1983 more demarcation laws were put in place. These laws prevented white settlers from stealing indigenous lands and further specified the borders of indigenous lands. However, other state agencies were allowed to specify borders which was heavily influenced by the mining industry sectors. Only 14% of lands ended up being demarcated and lots of land was lost to mining companies.

In 1988 Brazil adopted a new constitution. It said that Indigenous lands and culture would be protected. This bill allowed indigenous people to safely live in their territory without fear of their land or resources being taken. However, this bill ended up being far less successful than it originally promised, as the Brazilian government was supposed to demarcate all indigenous territories by 1993, but over those five years they only demarcated 50% of the territories.

By 2017 still little action had been taken on securing the land rights of indigenous people in Brazil. Brazil's president in 2017 declared a cutoff date on indigenous land. The bill stated that if the indigenous people were not in their territory before the 1988 cutoff, it was not their land to demarcate. 27 indigenous territories demarcation was suspended because of this cut off, even though the reason they couldn't declare their territory before 1988 was due to the government or because they couldn't prove they previously resided there. In February 2020 president Jair Bolsonaro proposed bill 191/2020, which will allow Indigenous territories to be opened up to mining and hydroelectric generation. This bill has caused push back from indigenous communities, for it threatens the health of their land and the safety of their people.

=== Mexico ===
The years after the Mexican Revolution of 1910 saw agrarian reforms (1917–1934), and in article 27 of the Mexican Constitution the encomienda system was abolished, and the right to communal land for traditional communities was affirmed. Thus the ejido-system was created, which in practice should comprise the power of private investments by foreign corporations and absentee landlords, and entitled the indigenous population to a piece of land to work and live on.
Since the 1980s and 1990s the focus of Mexico's economic policy concentrated more on industrial development and attracting foreign capital. The Salinas government initiated a process of privatization of land (through the PROCEDE-program). In 1992, as a (pre)condition for Mexico for entering the North American Free Trade Agreement (NAFTA) with the US and Canada, art.4 and art.27 of the Constitution were modified, by means of which it became possible to privatize communal ejido land via allotment or other means. This undermined the basic security of Indigenous communities to aboriginal title.

== See also ==
- Free, prior and informed consent
- Land rights
- United Nations Declaration on the Rights of Peasants

== Bibliography ==
- Richardson, Benjamin J., Shin Imai & Kent McNeil. 2009. Indigenous peoples and the law: comparative and critical perspectives.
- Robertson, L.G., (2005), Conquest by Law: How the Discovery of America Dispossessed Indigenous Peoples of Their Lands, Oxford University Press, New York ISBN 0-19-514869-X
- Snow, Alpheus Henry. 1919. The Question of Aborigines in the Law and Practice of Nations.
