= Nonviolent resistance =

Act of protest through nonviolent means

Mahatma Gandhi leading his followers on the famous Salt March to abolish the British Salt Laws

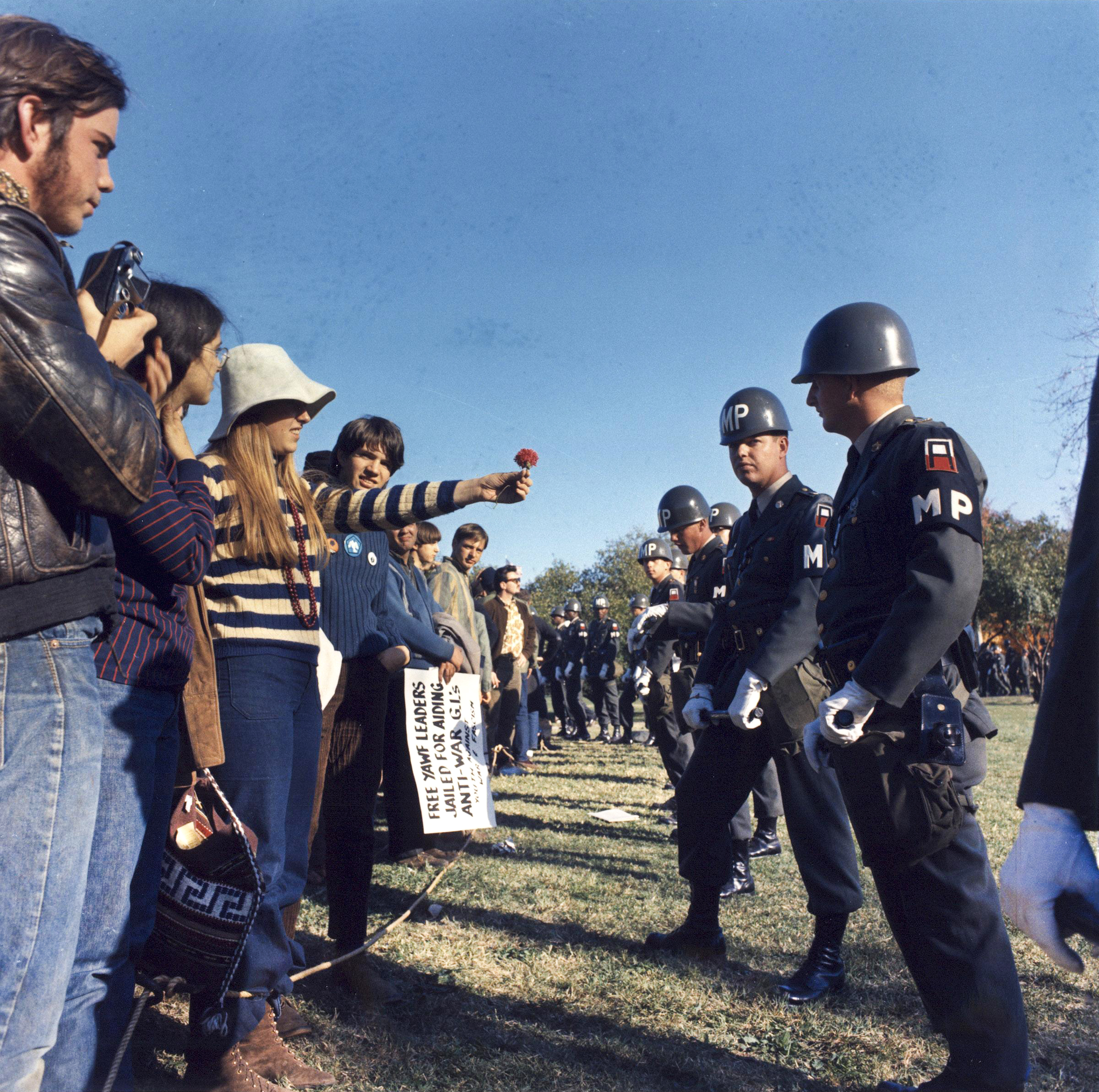
A demonstrator offers a flower to military police at a National Mobilization Committee to End the War in Vietnam-sponsored protest in Arlington, Virginia, on October 21, 1967.

Nonviolent resistance, or nonviolent action, sometimes called civil resistance, is the practice of achieving goals such as social change through symbolic protests, civil disobedience, economic or political noncooperation, satyagraha, constructive program, or other methods, while refraining from violence and the threat of violence. This type of action highlights the desires of an individual or group that feels that something needs to change to improve the current condition of the resisting person or group.

Mahatma Gandhi is the most popular figure related to this type of protest; United Nations celebrates Gandhi's birthday, October 2, as the International Day of Non-Violence. Other prominent advocates include Abdul Ghaffar Khan, Henry David Thoreau, Etienne de la Boétie, Charles Stewart Parnell, Te Whiti o Rongomai, Tohu Kākahi, Leo Tolstoy, Alice Paul, Martin Luther King Jr., Daniel Berrigan, Philip Berrigan, James Bevel, Václav Havel, Andrei Sakharov, Lech Wałęsa, Gene Sharp, Nelson Mandela, Jose Rizal, and many others. From 1966 to 1999, nonviolent civic resistance played a critical role in fifty of sixty-seven transitions from authoritarianism.

The "Singing revolution" (1989–1991) in Estonia, Latvia and Lithuania, led to the three Baltic countries' restoration of independence from the Soviet Union in 1991. In 2003, nonviolent resistance led to the Rose Revolution in Georgia. Research shows that nonviolent campaigns diffuse spatially. Information on nonviolent resistance in one country could significantly affect nonviolent activism in other countries.

Many movements which promote philosophies of nonviolence or pacifism have pragmatically adopted the methods of nonviolent action as an effective way to achieve social or political goals. They employ nonviolent resistance tactics such as: information warfare, picketing, marches, vigils, leafletting, samizdat, magnitizdat, satyagraha, protest art, protest music and poetry, community education and consciousness raising, lobbying, tax resistance, civil disobedience, boycotts or sanctions, legal/diplomatic wrestling, Underground Railroads, principled refusal of awards/honors, and general strikes. Current nonviolent resistance movements include: the Jeans Revolution in Belarus, the fight of the Cuban dissidents, and internationally the Extinction Rebellion and School Strike for Climate.

Although nonviolent movements can maintain broader public legitimacy by refraining from violence, some segments of society may perceive protest movements as being more violent than they really are when they disagree with the social goals of the movement. Research also shows that the perceived violence of a movement is not only influenced by its tactics but also by the identity of its participants. For example, protests led or dominated by women are generally seen as less violent than those led by men, though this effect depends on whether female protesters conform to or challenge traditional gender norms. A great deal of work has addressed the factors that lead to violent mobilization, but less attention has been paid to understanding why disputes become violent or nonviolent, comparing these two as strategic choices relative to conventional politics.

== History ==
Dates	Region	Main article	Summary
BCE 470–391	China	Mohism	The Mohist philosophical school disapproved of war. However, since they lived in a time of warring polities, they cultivated the science of fortification.
Around CE 26–36	Judea	Pontius Pilate	Jews demonstrated in Caesarea to try to convince Pontius Pilate not to set up Roman standards, with images of the Roman emperor and the eagle of Jupiter, in Jerusalem (both images were considered idolatrous by religious Jews). Pilate surrounded the Jewish protesters with soldiers and threatened them with death, to which they replied that they were willing to die rather than see the laws of the Torah violated.
Before 1500–1835	Chatham Islands, New Zealand	Moriori	The Moriori were a branch of the New Zealand Māori that colonized the Chatham Islands and eventually became hunter-gatherers. Their lack of resources and small population made conventional war unsustainable, so it became customary to resolve disputes nonviolently or ritually. Due to this tradition of nonviolence, most of the population of 2000 people were killed when 900 Māori invaded the island in 1835.
1819	England	Peterloo Massacre	Famine and chronic unemployment, coupled with the lack of suffrage in northern England, led to a peaceful demonstration of 60,000–80,000 persons, including women and children. The demonstration was organized and rehearsed, with a "prohibition of all weapons of offence or defence" and exhortations to come "armed with no other weapon but that of a self-approving conscience". Cavalry charged into the crowd, with sabres drawn, and in the ensuing confusion, 15 people were killed and 400–700 were injured. Newspapers expressed horror, and Percy Shelley glorified nonviolent resistance in the poem The Masque of Anarchy. However, the British government cracked down on reform, with the passing of what became known as the Six Acts.
1823–1829	Ireland	Catholic Association	One of the first mass-membership political movements of Europe, the Catholic Association, was founded by Daniel O'Connell to use nonviolent means to push the British government to pass Catholic emancipation, which culminated in the passing of the Roman Catholic Relief Act 1829 by the government of the Duke of Wellington
1834–1838	Trinidad	End of Slavery in Trinidad	The United Kingdom of Great Britain and Ireland, then the colonial power in Trinidad, first announced in 1833 the impending total liberation of slaves by 1840. In 1834 at an address by the Governor at Government House about the new laws, an unarmed group of mainly elderly people of African descent began chanting: "Pas de six ans. Point de six ans" ("No six years. Not at all six years"), drowning out the voice of the Governor. Peaceful protests continued until the passing of a resolution to abolish apprenticeship and the achievement of de facto freedom.
1838	US	Cherokee removal	The majority of Cherokee refused to recognize the minority-promulgated Treaty of New Echota and therefore did not sell their livestock or goods, and did not pack anything to travel to the west before the soldiers came and forcibly removed them. That ended tragically in the Cherokee trail of tears.
1848–1920	US	Women's suffrage in the United States	A political movement that spanned over a century, where women protested to receive the right to suffrage in the United States.
1849–1867	Austrian Empire	Passive Resistance (Hungary)	In the failed Hungarian Revolution of 1848, the Hungarians tried to regain independence and were defeated by the Austrian Empire only with the aid of the Russian Empire. After 1848, the empire instituted several constitutional reforms, trying to resolve the problem, but without success. The resistance was instrumental in keeping up hope and spirit in a Hungary fully incorporated into Austria and characterized by reprisals against political dissidents, thousands of treason trials, military governance, centralization, absolutism, censorship and direct control of Vienna over every aspect of public life. Their followers carefully avoided any political agitation or criticism of the establishment, and strictly concentrated on national issues of non-political nature, such as the use of the Hungarian language, development of the Hungarian economy, and protection of the legal standing of the Hungarian Academy of Sciences.
1867–1918	Austria-Hungary	Old Czech Party	Passive resistance of the Old Czech Party reacted on autonomy gained to the Kingdom of Hungary, but not to the Lands of the Bohemian Crown within the Austrian Empire. After 1874, a wing of the party disagreeing with the passive resistance stance formed the new Young Czech Party. Old Czechs remained with their politics, but they lost decisive influence in the politics of the Kingdom of Bohemia.
1860–1894, 1915–1918	New Zealand	Tainui-Waikato	Māori King Tāwhiao forbade Waikato Māori using violence in the face of British colonisation, saying in 1881, "The killing of men must stop; the destruction of land must stop. I shall bury my patu in the earth and it shall not rise again ... Waikato, lie down. Do not allow blood to flow from this time on." This was inspirational to Waikato Māori who refused to fight in World War I. In response, the government brought in conscription for the Tainui-Waikato people (other Māori iwi were exempt) but they continued to resist, the majority of conscripts choosing to suffer harsh military punishments rather than join the army. For the duration of the war, no Tainui soldiers were sent overseas.
1879–1881	New Zealand	Parihaka	The Māori village of Parihaka became the center of passive resistance campaigns against Europeans occupying confiscated land in the area. More than 400 followers of the prophet Te Whiti o Rongomai were arrested and jailed, most without trial. Sentences as long as 16 months were handed out for the acts of ploughing land and erecting fences on their property. More than 2000 inhabitants remained seated when 1600 armed soldiers raided and destroyed the village.
1879	Ireland	Boycott	Irish nationalist leader Charles Stewart Parnell, in a speech in Ennis proposed that when dealing with tenants who took farms where another tenant was evicted, rather than resorting to violence, everyone in the locality should shun them. Following this Captain Charles Boycott, the land agent of an absentee landlord in County Mayo, Ireland, was subject to social ostracism organized by the Irish Land League in 1880. Boycott attempted to evict eleven tenants from his land. While Parnell's speech did not refer to land agents or landlords, the tactic was applied to Boycott when the alarm was raised about the evictions. Despite the short-term economic hardship to those undertaking this action, Boycott soon found himself isolated – his workers stopped work in the fields and stables, as well as in his house. Local businessmen stopped trading with him, and the local postman refused to deliver mail. The success of this led to the movement spreading throughout Ireland and gave rise to the term to Boycott, and eventually led to legal reform and increased support for Irish independence.
1903–1906	United Kingdom	Protest against the Education Act 1902	This civil disobedience movement was launched against the Education Act 1902 to defend the rights and influence of Nonconformist denominations in British school boards. Nonconformists believed this law to be calculated to support denominational (mainly Anglican and Catholic) religious teaching in the schools. John Clifford, a baptist minister, led the movement, which consisted in refusing to pay the taxes established by the Education Act 1902. By 1906, over 170 men had been imprisoned for this refusal, and yet no change to the law was made. The movement had a large share in the defeat of the Unionist government in January 1906 but failed to achieve its ultimate aim of getting a nondenominational act passed.
1905	Russia	Bloody Sunday (1905)	Unarmed demonstrators led by Father Georgy Gapon marched to the Winter Palace to present a petition to the Czar. They were fired upon by soldiers of the Imperial Guard.
1908–1962	Samoa	Mau movement	Nonviolent movement for Samoan independence from colonial rule in the early 20th century.
1919. 2.8, 3.1	Korea	March 1st Movement	This movement became the inspiration of later Mohandas Karamchand Gandhi's Satyagraha—resistance and many other nonviolent movements in Asia.
1919–22	Egypt	Egyptian Revolution of 1919	A countrywide revolution against the British occupation of Egypt. It was carried out by Egyptians from different walks of life in the wake of the British-ordered exile of revolutionary leader Saad Zaghlul and other members of the Wafd Party in 1919. The event led to Egyptian independence in 1922 and the implementation of a new constitution in 1923.
1919–1921	Ireland	Irish Non-cooperation movement	During the Irish War for Independence, Irish nationalists used many nonviolent means to resist British rule. Amongst these was abstention from the British parliament, tax boycotts, and the creation of alternative local government, Dáil Courts, and police.
1919–present	Israel/Palestine	Palestinian nonviolent resistance	Peace camps and strategic nonviolent resistance to Israeli construction of Jewish settlements and of the West Bank Barrier have been adopted as tactics by Palestinians as part of the Israeli–Palestinian conflict. For example, citizens of the Palestinian village of Beit Sahour engaged in a tax strike during the First Intifada. In 2010, A "White Intifada" took hold in the West Bank, including East Jerusalem. Activities included weekly peaceful protests by Palestinian activists accompanied by Israeli human rights organization B'Tselem and Israeli academics and students against settlers and security forces. The EU, through its foreign policy chief Catherine Ashton has criticised Israel for convicting an organiser of the peaceful movement and said that she was deeply concerned about the arrest of Abdullah Abu Rahmeh. There have been two fatalities among protesters and an American peace activist suffered brain damage after being hit by a tear gas canister.
1920–1922	India	Non-cooperation movement	A series of nationwide people's movements of nonviolent resistance and civil disobedience, led by Mohandas Karamchand Gandhi (Mahatma Gandhi) and the Indian National Congress. In addition to bringing about independence, Gandhi's nonviolence also helped improve the status of the Untouchables in Indian society.
1929-1946	Pakistan	Khudai Khidmatgar (Servants of God)	Abdul Ghaffar Khan along with his companions established an organization among Pashtun in the North Western Frontier Province and called it Khudai Khidmatgar (Servants of God). The organization recruited over 250,000 unarmed members. They committed two hours of community service daily and practiced nonviolent resistance to British Raj occupation.
1920–1925	Punjab Province	Akali Movement	Peaceful movement to free Gurdwaras from Mahants.
1923	Germany	The Occupation of the Ruhr	With the aim of occupying the centre of German coal, iron, and steel production in the Ruhr valley, France invaded Germany for neglecting some of its reparation payments after World War I. The occupation of the Ruhr was initially greeted by a campaign of passive resistance.
1930–1934	India	Civil disobedience movement	Nonviolent resistance marked by rejecting British-imposed taxes, boycotting British manufactured products and mass strikes, led by Mohandas Karamchand Gandhi (Mahatma Gandhi) and the Indian National Congress.
1933–1945	Germany	German Resistance	Throughout World War II, there were a series of small and usually isolated groups that used nonviolent techniques against the Nazis. These groups include the White Rose and the Confessional Church.
1940–1943	Denmark	Danish resistance movement	During World War II, after the invasion of the Wehrmacht, the Danish government adopted a policy of official co-operation (and unofficial obstruction) which they called "negotiation under protest." Embraced by many Danes, the unofficial resistance included slow production, emphatic celebration of Danish culture and history, and bureaucratic quagmires.
1940–1944	France	Le Chambon-sur-Lignon Jewish refuge	During World War II, with the leadership of two pacifist local ministers André Trocmé and Edouard Theis, the citizens of the village of Le Chambon-sur-Lignon (and of the neighbouring areas) risked their lives to hide Jews who were being rounded up by the Nazis and the collaborationist Vichy regime and sent to the death camps. This was done in open defiance of the Vichy government's orders. It is estimated that the people of the area of Le Chambon-sur-Lignon saved between 3,000 and 5,000 Jews from certain death. A small garden and plaque on the grounds of the Yad Vashem memorial to the Holocaust in Israel was dedicated to the people of le Chambon-sur-Lignon.
1940–1945	Norway	Norwegian resistance movement	During World War II, Norwegian civil disobedience included preventing the Nazification of Norway's educational system, distributing illegal newspapers, and maintaining social distance (an "ice front") from the German soldiers.
1942	India	Quit India Movement	The Quit India Movement (Bharat Chhodo Andolan or the August Movement) was a civil disobedience movement launched in India in August 1942 in response to Mohandas Gandhi's call for immediate independence.
1945–1971	South Africa	Defiance Campaign; Internal resistance to South African apartheid	The ANC and allied anti-apartheid groups initially carried out nonviolent resistance against pro-racial segregation and apartheid governments in South Africa.
1946–1958	Territory of Hawaii	Hawaii Democratic Revolution of 1954	Following World War II, general strikes were initiated by the large working poor against racial and economic inequality under Hawaii's plantation economy. Movement members took over most of the government in 1954 and the State of Hawaii was established in 1959.
1955–1968	USA	Civil Rights Movement; Chicano Movement; Mass anti-war protests in the United States	Tactics of nonviolent resistance, such as bus boycotts, Freedom Rides, sit-ins, marches, and mass demonstrations, were used during the Civil Rights Movement. This movement succeeded in bringing about legislative change, making separate seats, drinking fountains, and schools for African Americans illegal, and obtaining full voting rights and open housing. Dr. Martin Luther King Jr. and James Bevel were prominent leaders of this movement, and were inspired by the nonviolent resistance of Gandhi. One study found that nonviolent activism of the era tended to produce favorable media coverage and changes in public opinion focusing on the issues organizers were raising, but violent protests tended to generate unfavorable media coverage that generated public desire to restore law and order.
1957–present	USA	Committee for Non-Violent Action	Among the most dedicated to nonviolent resistance against the US arsenal of nuclear weapons has been the Plowshares Movement, consisting largely of Catholic priests, such as Dan Berrigan, and nuns. Since the first Plowshares action in King of Prussia, Pennsylvania, during the autumn of 1980, more than 70 of these actions have taken place.
1959–present	Cuba	Cuban opposition since 1959	There have been many nonviolent activists in opposition to Cuba's authoritarian regime. Among these are Pedro Luis Boitel (1931–1972), Guillermo Fariñas Hernández ("El Coco"), and Jorge Luis García Pérez (known as Antúnez), all of whom have performed hunger strikes.
1965–1973	USA	Draft resistance	During the Vietnam War, many young Americans chose to resist the military draft by refusing to cooperate with the Selective Service System. Techniques of resistance included misrepresenting one's physical or mental condition to the draft board, disrupting draft board processes, going "underground", going to jail, leaving the country, and publicly promoting such activities.
February 11, 1967	USA	Los Angeles Black Cat Tavern Protest	A tense standoff and potential riot between hundreds of LAPD riot gear-laden police officers and swelling crowds of more than four hundred homosexual citizens was averted after a last-minute plea from then-new Governor Ronald Reagan. The resulting stand-down order directed the hundreds of LAPD officers present to cease and desist from further unprovoked harassment of homosexuals in Los Angeles. As a result, the Los Angeles Police Department ceased raiding establishments or public assemblies of homosexuals in Los Angeles for decades.
1967–1972	Northern Ireland	Northern Ireland civil rights movement	Movement led by the Northern Ireland Civil Rights Association seeking an end to discrimination against Catholics in areas such as elections (which were subject to gerrymandering and property requirements), discrimination in employment, in public housing, policing; and abuse of the Special Powers Act. The movement used marches, pickets, sit-ins and protests. In the wake of rising violence (Battle of the Bogside, 1969 Northern Ireland riots, Bloody Sunday 1972) NICRA ceased operation and the conflict descended into the violent "Troubles" which lasted until 1998.
1968	Worldwide	Protests of 1968	The protests that raged throughout 1968 were for the most part student-led. Worldwide, campuses became the front-line battlegrounds for social change. While opposition to the Vietnam War dominated the protests, students also protested for civil liberties, against racism, for feminism, and the beginnings of the ecology movement can be traced to the protests against nuclear and biological weapons during this year.
1968	Czechoslovakia	Prague Spring	During the 1968 Warsaw Pact invasion of Czechoslovakia, the Czechoslovak citizens responded to the attack on their sovereignty with passive resistance. Russian troops were frustrated as street signs were painted over, their water supplies mysteriously shut off, and buildings decorated with flowers, flags, and slogans like "An elephant cannot swallow a hedgehog".
1970–1981	France	Larzac	In response to an expansion of a military base, local farmers including José Bové and other supporters including Lanza del Vasto took part in nonviolent resistance. The military expansion was canceled after ten years of resistance.
1979	Iran	Iranian Revolution	The Iranian Revolution of 1979 or 1979 Revolution (often known as the Islamic Revolution), refers to events involving the overthrow of Iran's monarchy under Shah Mohammad Reza Pahlavi.
1980–1981 as movement	Poland	Solidarity; Fighting Solidarity; Orange Alternative etc.	Solidarity, a broad anti-communist social movement ranging from people associated with the Roman Catholic Church workers and intellectuals to members of the anti-communist Left (minority), advocated nonviolence in its members' activities. Additionally, the Orange Alternative offered a wider group of citizens an alternative way of opposition against the authoritarian regime by means of a peaceful protest that used absurd and nonsensical elements.
1986	Philippines	People Power Revolution	A series of nonviolent and prayerful mass street demonstrations that toppled Ferdinand Marcos and placed Corazon C. Aquino into power. After an election which had been condemned by the Catholic Bishops' Conference of the Philippines, over two million Filipinos protested human rights violations, election fraud, massive political corruption, and other abuses of the Marcos regime. Yellow was a predominant theme, the colour being associated with Corazon Aquino and her husband, Benigno S. Aquino Jr., who was assassinated three years prior.
1988–2016	Burma	Nonviolent Movement for Freedom and Democracy	Starting from 1988 peaceful demonstrations led by Aung San Suu Kyi caused her house arrest and thousands were killed, jailed and tortured by the military; the struggle continues more than two decades. Despite many victims and a painful process (including annulled winning of 1990 election), it was happily ended by the victory of the opposition party in the 2015 election and Aung San Suu Kyi was elected as the country's first state counsellor. Following the restoration of military rule in 2021, civil resistance has been used as part of campaigns for democracy.
1987–1989/1991	The Baltic countries (Lithuania, Latvia, Estonia)	Singing revolution	A cycle of mass demonstrations featuring spontaneous singing in the three Baltic countries. The movement eventually collected 4,000,000 people who sang national songs and hymns, which were strictly forbidden during the years of the Soviet occupation of the Baltic States, as local rock musicians played. In later years, people acted as human shields to protect radio and TV stations from the Soviet tanks, eventually regaining Lithuania's, Latvia's, and Estonia's independence without almost any bloodshed.
1989	China	Tiananmen Square protests of 1989	Nonviolence in 1989 Tiananmen protests.
1989	Lithuania, Latvia and Estonia	Baltic Way	Approximately two million people joined their hands on 23 August 1989 to form a human chain spanning 675.5 kilometres (419.7 mi) across the three Baltic states – Estonia, Latvia and Lithuania, which were at the time under Soviet rule. It marked the 50th anniversary of the Molotov–Ribbentrop Pact between the Soviet Union and Nazi Germany.
1989	Czechoslovakia	Velvet Revolution	Protesters protested peacefully against the one-party rule.
1989–90	East Germany	Monday demonstrations in East Germany	The Monday demonstrations in East Germany in 1989 and 1990 (German: Montagsdemonstrationen) were a series of peaceful political protests against the authoritarian government of the German Democratic Republic (GDR) of East Germany that took place every Monday evening.
1990–91	Azerbaijan SSR	Black January	A crackdown of Azeri protest demonstrations by the Red Army in Baku, Azerbaijan SSR. The demonstrators protested against ethnic violence, demanded the ousting of communist officials and called for independence from the Soviet Union.
1996–97	Serbia	1996–1997 protests in Serbia	The protests started on 17 November 1996 in Niš where thousands of opposition supporters gathered to protest against election fraud. Belgrade University students joined on 19 November 1996, and protests lasted even after 11 February 1997, when Slobodan Milošević signed the "lex specialis", which accepted the opposition victory and instated local government in several cities, but without acknowledging any wrongdoing. The protests were strongest in the capital Belgrade, where they gathered up to 200,000 people, but spread over most cities and towns in Serbia.
2000	Serbia	Otpor!	Otpor! (English: Resistance!) was a civic youth movement that existed as such from 1998 until 2003 in Serbia (then a federal unit within FR Yugoslavia), employing nonviolent struggle against the regime of Slobodan Milošević as their course of action. In the course of a two-year nonviolent struggle against Milošević, Otpor spread across Serbia and attracted more than 70,000 supporters. They were credited for their role in the successful overthrow of Slobodan Milošević on 5 October 2000.
2003	Liberia	Women of Liberia Mass Action for Peace	This peace movement, started by women praying and singing in a fish market, brought an end to the Second Liberian Civil War in 2003.
2003	Georgia	Rose Revolution	A pro-Western peaceful change of power in Georgia in November 2003. The revolution was brought about by widespread protests over the disputed parliamentary elections and culminated in the ousting of President Eduard Shevardnadze, which marked the end of the Soviet era of leadership in the country. The event derives its name from the climactic moment, when demonstrators led by Mikheil Saakashvili stormed the Parliament session with red roses in hand.
2004–2005	Ukraine	Orange Revolution	A series of protests and political events that took place in Ukraine in the immediate aftermath of the run-off vote of the 2004 Ukrainian presidential election which was marred by massive corruption, voter intimidation and direct electoral fraud. Nationwide, the democratic revolution was highlighted by a series of acts of civil disobedience, sit-ins, and general strikes organized by the opposition movement.
2005	Lebanon	Cedar Revolution	A chain of demonstrations in Lebanon (especially in the capital Beirut) triggered by the assassination of the former Lebanese Prime Minister Rafik Hariri on 14 February 2005.
2005–06, 2009	Ukraine	Remember about the Gas – Do not buy Russian goods!	A campaign to boycott Russian goods as a reaction to political pressure from the Russian Federation on Ukraine in the gas conflicts of 2005–2006 and 2008–2009.
2009–present	Guatemala	Escobal mine protests	Protests against the construction of the Escobal mine in San Rafael Las Flores, centering around environmental concerns and the land rights of the indigenous Xinca people. Protesters have used nonviolent tactics such as standing to block access to mine facilities and organizing community referendums, and they have been met with extreme violence from both the mine's private security and the Guatemalan state.
2010–2011	Tunisia	Tunisian Revolution	A chain of demonstrations against unemployment and government corruption in Tunisia began in December 2010. Protests were triggered by the self-immolation of vegetable seller Mohamed Bouazizi and resulted in the overthrow of 24-year-ruling president Zine el-Abidine Ben Ali on 14 January 2011.
2011	Egypt	Egyptian Revolution	A chain of protests, sit-ins, and strikes by millions of Egyptians starting 25 January 2011 eventually led to the resignation of President Hosni Mubarak on 11 February.
2011	Libya	Libyan Protests	Protests against the regime of Colonel Muammar al-Gaddafi began on 13 January 2011. In late January, Jamal al-Hajji, a writer, political commentator and accountant, "call[ed] on the Internet for demonstrations to be held in support of greater freedoms in Libya" inspired by the Tunisian and Egyptian revolutions. He was arrested on 1 February by plain-clothes police officers, and charged on 3 February with injuring someone with his car. Amnesty International stated that because al-Hajji had previously been imprisoned for his nonviolent political opinions, the real reason for the present arrest appeared to be his call for demonstrations. In early February, Gaddafi, on behalf of the Jamahiriya, met with political activists, journalists and media figures and warned them that they would be held responsible if they disturbed the peace or created chaos in Libya. The plans to protest were inspired by the Tunisian and Egyptian revolution.
2011	Syria	Syrian Uprising	Protests against the regime of President Bashar al-Assad began on March 15, 2011. Security forces responded with a harsh crackdown, arresting thousands of dissidents and killing hundreds of protesters. Peaceful protests were largely crushed by the army or subsided as rebels and Islamist fighters took up arms against the government, leading to a full-blown rebellion against the Assad regime.
2011	India	2011 Indian anti-corruption movement	The movement gained momentum from 5 April 2011, when anti-corruption activist Anna Hazare began a hunger strike at the Jantar Mantar in New Delhi. The chief legislative aim of the movement was to alleviate corruption in the Indian government through introduction of the Jan Lokpal Bill. Another aim, spearheaded by Ramdev, was the repatriation of black money from Swiss and other foreign banks.
2011–2014	Bahrain	Bahraini uprising of 2011	Inspired by the regional Arab Spring, protests started in Bahrain on 14 February. The government responded harshly, killing four protesters camping in Pearl Roundabout. Later, protesters were allowed to reoccupy the roundabout where they staged large marches amounting to 150,000 participants. On 14 March, Saudi-led GCC forces were requested by the government and entered the country, which the opposition called an "occupation". The following day, a state of emergency was declared and protests paused after a brutal crackdown was launched against protesters, including doctors and bloggers. Nearly 3,000 people have been arrested, and at least five people died due to torture while in police custody. Protests resumed after the emergency law was lifted on 1 June, and several large rallies were staged by the opposition parties, including a march on 9 March 2012 attended by over 100,000. Smaller-scale protests and clashes outside of the capital have continued to occur almost daily. More than 80 people had died since the start of the uprising.
1979–present	Saudi Arabia	Saudi uprising (1979–present); 1979 Qatif Uprising; Saudi Arabian protests Discrimination in the workforce (Saudi Arabia); Execution of Nimr al-Nimr	Shiite community leaders in Qatif announced that they would publicly celebrate the Day of Ashura festival, even though celebration of Shiite festivals was banned. Despite government threats to disperse protests, on 25 November 1979, 4,000 Shiite in Safwa took to the streets to publicly celebrate the Day of Ashura. Shia are prohibited from becoming teachers of religious subjects, which constitute about half of the courses in secondary education. Shia cannot become principals of schools. Some Shia have become university professors but often face harassment from students and faculty alike. Shia are disqualified as witnesses in court, as Saudi Sunni sources cite the Shi'a practise of Taqiyya wherein it is permissible to lie while one is in fear or at risk of significant persecution. Shia cannot serve as judges in ordinary court, and are banned from gaining admission to military academies,[34] and from high-ranking government or security posts, including becoming pilots in Saudi Airlines. Amir Taheri quotes a Shi'ite businessman from Dhahran as saying "It is not normal that there are no Shi'ite army officers, ministers, governors, mayors and ambassadors in this kingdom. This form of religious apartheid is as intolerable as was apartheid based on race. In October 2011, during the 2011–12 Saudi Arabian protests, al-Nimr said that young people protesting in response to the arrests of two al-Awamiyah septuagenarians were provoked by police firing at them with live ammunition. On 4 October, he called for calm, stating, "The [Saudi] authorities depend on bullets ... and killing and imprisonment. We must depend on the roar of the word, on the words of justice".[11] He explained further, "We do not accept [the use of firearms]. This is not our practice. We will lose it. It is not in our favour. This is our approach [use of words]. We welcome those who follow such [an] attitude. Nonetheless, we cannot enforce our methodology on those who want to pursue different approaches [and] do not commit to ours. The weapon of the word is stronger than the power of bullets."
2012–2013	Mexico	Yo Soy 132	
2013	Turkey	Gezi Park protests	Peaceful protests against reconstruction of Gezi Park at Istanbul's landmark Taksim Square, turned into protests against Turkish Prime Minister Recep Tayyip Erdoğan. Over one million people nonviolently resisted police brutality. Started in Istanbul, protests spread in 10 days to over 82 cities in Turkey. Significant violence from the police side was manifested by the use of tear gas and rubber bullets. Many people were arrested, including haphazard arrests of people simply standing at the square.
2013–present	Ukraine	Do not buy Russian goods!	A campaign to boycott Russian goods as a reaction to a series of Russian trade embargos against Ukraine and military invasion of Russia in Ukraine.
2014	Taiwan	Sunflower Student Movement	The activists protested the passing of the Cross-Strait Service Trade Agreement (CSSTA) by occupying the Legislative Yuan from 18 March to 10 April 2014.
2014	Hong Kong	Umbrella Revolution	Student class boycotts and public demonstrations followed by spontaneous outbreak of civil disobedience and street occupation lasting 79 days.
2016–present	Zimbabwe	#ThisFlag Movement	Mass Stayaways which were backed by a rigorous social media campaign to bring social and political change in Zimbabwe.
2017	Tamil Nadu – India	2017 pro-Jallikattu protests	Peaceful demonstrations organized primarily by civilians, without any specific leaders, followed by an outbreak of civil disobedience and people occupying Marina shore in Chennai and other prominent places across the state, demanding a permanent solution for Jallikattu by passing a permanent ordinance to support Jallikattu and to boycott foreign companies such as Pepsi, Coca-Cola as their water consumption is affecting local farmers.
2016–2017	South Korea	Impeachment of Park Geun-hye	Peaceful demonstrations against President Park Geun-hye resulted in the impeachment of the South Korean president.
2017	Catalonia – Spain	Catalan independence referendum	On 1 October 2017, an illegal referendum was held on the independence of Catalonia. 2,286,217 people participated. During the celebration the police forces acted hard against the voters.
2018–present	Iran	White Wednesdays; Girl of Enghelab Street	Peaceful demonstrations against compulsory hijab and sex discrimination.
2018	Tamil Nadu – India	Anti-Sterlite protest	100-day peaceful demonstration against Sterlite Copper Corporation in Tuticorin, Tamil Nadu. Despite pollution control regulatory and environmental research institute reports along with apex court orders to shut down the industry, smelting operations were continued. Public demanded state to stop further expansion plans as a continuous response against the ill effects of pollution caused by the smelter.
2018–2019	Sudan	2018–19 Sudanese protests Khartoum massacre	Peaceful demonstrations and sit-ins against the regime of Omar al-Bashir and succeeding military junta.
2019–2021	Algeria	2019 Algerian protests	Peaceful demonstrations and sit-ins against the regime of Abdelaziz Bouteflika.
2019–2020	India	Shaheen Bagh protest	Peaceful protests led by Muslim ladies against CAA among other things.
2020–2021	Belarus	2020–2021 Belarusian protests	Peaceful mass demonstrations against the contested re-election of President Alexander Lukashenko and state violence.
2020–2021	India	2020–2021 Indian farmers' protest	Peaceful protest against the three farm bills passed by parliament.
2020–2021	Thailand	2020–2021 Thai Protests	Ongoing peaceful protest to reform the Thai Monarchy and coup-installed government.
2021–present	Turkey	2021 Boğaziçi University protests	Ongoing peaceful protests against the rector appointment without election
2022–present	Pakistan	2022 Regime Change Conspiracy	Ongoing peaceful protests all over the country and worldwide (among nonresident Pakistanis especially UK and USA) against the alleged foreign conspiracy and military-backed government and demanding fresh elections.
2022	China	White Paper Protests	A series of protests against COVID-19 lockdowns began in mainland China in November 2022. Protesters usually held blank sheets of paper as a symbol.

== Comparison with civil disobedience ==
Nonviolent resistance is often but wrongly taken as synonymous with civil disobedience. Each of these terms—nonviolent resistance and civil disobedience—has different connotations and commitments. Berel Lang argues against the conflation of nonviolent resistance and civil disobedience on the grounds that the necessary conditions for an act instancing civil disobedience are: (1) that the act violates the law, (2) that the act is performed intentionally, and (3) that the actor anticipates and willingly accepts punitive measures made on the part of the state against him in retaliation for the act. Since acts of nonviolent political resistance need not satisfy any of these criteria, Lang argues that the two categories of action cannot be identified with one another. Furthermore, civil disobedience is a form of political action which necessarily aims at reform, rather than revolution. Its efforts are typically directed at the disputing of particular laws or groups of laws while conceding the authority of the government responsible for them. In contrast, political acts of nonviolent resistance can have revolutionary ends. According to Lang, civil disobedience need not be nonviolent, although the extent and intensity of the violence is limited by the non-revolutionary intentions of the persons engaging in civil disobedience. Lang argues that violent resistance by citizens being forcibly relocated to detention, short of the use of lethal violence against representatives of the state, could plausibly count as civil disobedience but could not count as nonviolent resistance.

== See also ==
- Active measures
- Everyday resistance
- Subversion
- Resistance movement

=== Documentaries ===
- A Force More Powerful, directed by Steve York
- How to Start a Revolution, directed by Ruaridh Arrow

=== Organizations and people ===
- List of peace activists
- List of anti-war organizations

=== Concepts ===
- Christian nonviolence – Theological and ethical position
- Civilian-based defense – Non-military action by a social group
- Direct action – Form of activism in which power is used
- Erasure poetry – Form of poetry
- Flower power – Slogan of passive resistance and nonviolence
- Industrial action – Measure taken by organised labour
- Internet resistance – Use of the internet to facilitate activism
- Interpassivity – Social concept
- Islamic nonviolence – Philosophical concept in Abrahamic religion
- Non-aggression principle – Core concept in libertarianism
- Nonresistance – Nonviolent philosophy
- Nonviolent revolution – Civil resistance to bring about the departure of governments
- Passive obedience – Religious and political doctrine
- Pen is mightier than the sword – Adage in the English language
- Rebellion – Violent resistance against government
- Sex strike – Strike in which one or more persons refrain from sex
- Social defence – Non-military action by a social group
- Tax resistance – Refusal to pay a tax in opposition to government policy or taxation itself
- Teach-in – Educational forum focused on action around political issues
- Third Party Non-violent Intervention – Practice in conflict resolution
- Transarmament – Replacement of armed forces with infrastructure to support nonviolent resistance
