= Isaías Soriano López =

Mexican politician

- Born: 7 June 1959 (age 66); Coixtlahuaca, Oaxaca, Mexico
- Occupation: Politician
- Political party: PRI

Isaías Soriano López (born 7 June 1959) is a Mexican politician affiliated with the Institutional Revolutionary Party (PRI). In the 2003 mid-terms he was elected to the Chamber of Deputies to represent the State of Mexico's 32nd district during the 59th session of Congress. Previously, in 2000–2003, he served in the Congress of the State of Mexico.
