= Tahoe Resources =

Mining exploration company founded in Vancouver, BC

Tahoe Resources Inc.
- Type: Public
- Industry: Metals and Mining
- Founded: 2009
- Founder: Kevin McArthur
- Fate: Acquired by Pan American Silver
- Headquarters: Reno, Nevada, U.S
- Key people: Kevin McArthur (chairman)
- Revenue: ▲US$519.7 million (2015)
- Operating income: ▼US$-79.5 million (2015)
- Net income: ▼US$-71.9 million (2015)
- Total assets: ▲US$2.0 billion (2015)
- Total equity: ▲US$1.6 billion (2015)
- Website: www.tahoeresources.com

Tahoe Resources Inc. was a mining company and intermediate precious metals producer with silver and gold mines in Canada, Guatemala and Peru. It was founded in Vancouver, British Columbia by Kevin McArthur, former CEO of Glamis Gold and Goldcorp. Incorporated in British Columbia, Canada, the company's U.S. headquarters is located in Reno, Nevada.

In 2016, the company acquired Lake Shore Gold in Ontario, valued at $945 million CAD, making it a wholly owned subsidiary of Tahoe Resources and effectively adding Lake Shore's Timmins West and Bell Creek gold mines in Ontario to Tahoe Resources' assets, which include mines in Guatemala and Peru. The company employs more than 2,000 people worldwide. Tahoe Resources is a publicly traded company in the Industrial Metals and Minerals industry, listed on the New York Stock Exchange and the Toronto Stock Exchange.

In 2017, Tahoe Resources was accused of using the "Guatemalan police and army violence to force its mining operation on the local communities." Tahoe is facing a criminal trial in Guatemala and a civil lawsuit in Canada for previous cases of alleged repression.

On 14 November 2018, it was announced that Pan American Silver would be acquiring Tahoe Resources for $1.1 billion.

== Operations ==
Tahoe Resources has five operating mines: Escobal mine in southeast Guatemala, La Arena gold mine in northern Peru, Shahuindo gold mine in northern Peru, and the Timmins West and Bell Creek mines in Ontario, Canada.

In 2016 Tahoe achieved record silver production by producing 21.3 million ounces at all-in sustaining costs of $8.06 per ounce. The company also produced 385,100 ounces of gold at all-in sustaining costs of $943 per ounce.

In Q1 2017 Tahoe produced 5.7 million ounces of silver and 119,000 ounces of gold. The company generated record earnings and cash flow from higher sales revenue and lower operating costs.

=== Escobal Silver Mine ===
The Escobal project is a high-grade silver discovery located in southeast Guatemala approximately 40 km. east-southeast of Guatemala City. In addition to silver, the mine contains sizable reserves of gold, lead, and zinc. Tahoe Resources acquired the project in mid-2010 from Goldcorp for $505 million (USD) in stock and cash. In November 2010, Tahoe Resources released a Preliminary Assessment of the project completed by M3 Engineering. In 2015, the Escobal mine produced a record 20.4 million ounces of silver in concentrate. As of January 2016, it was estimated that the Escobal mine contained indicated resources of 389 million silver ounces at an average grade of 332 grams per tonne (g/t), along with significant quantities of lead, zinc, and gold. Proven and Probable reserves are 29.1 million tonnes at an average grade of 332 g/t silver, containing 310.4 million ounces of silver. Figures such as these have caused mining experts to suggest that the Escobal mine could become one of the largest silver producers in the world.

Underground development on the mine began in May 2011, and the exploitation license was granted in April 2013. Roughly 500 construction jobs were created with the mine's development. Mining operations began in September 2013, and the first precious metal concentrate shipment was sent on October 15, 2013. For the year ending December 31, 2013, Tahoe Resources announced that its net earnings for the year were $65.6 million ($0.45/share). During 2013, the company incurred $36.4 million in expenses for the Escobal mine project. Commercial operations began in January 2014.

Regional exploration in Guatemala was suspended in 2013 following the government's proposed moratorium on new exploration licenses. Exploration since that date has focused only on the 79.9 km2 granted concessions surrounding the Escobal mine. Dialogue continues with the Ministry of Energy and Mines to grant additional exploration licenses while community work continues in areas of exploration interest.

In July 2017 Tahoe announced that the Supreme Court of Guatemala had issued a decision to temporarily suspend its Escobal mining license in response to action brought by an anti-mining organization that claimed Guatemala's Ministry of Energy and Mines had violated the Xinca Indigenous people's right of consultation in advance of granting the permit.

=== La Arena Gold Mine ===
On February 9, 2015, Tahoe Resources announced a merger with Rio Alto Mining, owner of the La Arena gold mine in northern Peru, for $1.12 billion. The merger was completed on April 1, 2015.

La Arena produced a company record 222,255 ounces of gold in 2014, beating estimates, which was followed in 2015 with production of 230,436 ounces of gold, exceeding that previous record.

La Arena is located 480 km. north-northwest of Lima, in the eastern slope of the Western Cordillera, close to the Continental Divide, at approximately 3,400 meters above sea level. It contains two types of deposits: oxide gold in brecciated sandstone as well as copper-gold sulfide mineralization.

In January 2016, Measured and Indicated oxide resources totaled 120.8 million tonnes with an average gold grade of .32 g/t and Proven and Probable oxide reserves of 80.3 million tonnes, with an average gold grade of .36 g/t containing 919,000 ounces of gold. Meanwhile, Measured and Indicated sulfide resources for the La Arena deposit totaled 274 million tonnes with average gold and copper grades of .24 g/t and .33 percent, respectively. Proven and Probable sulfide reserves are 63.1 million tonnes with average gold and copper grades of .31 g/t and .43 percent, respectively.

=== Shahuindo Gold Mine ===
In the merger between Tahoe Resources and Rio Alto Mining, Tahoe Resources took ownership of Shahuindo gold project, which Rio Alto had acquired from Sulliden Gold in August 2014. Construction began on the project in mid-2015, with commercial production anticipated to begin in the second quarter of 2016.

Shahuindo is located in a prolific gold-producing area in northern Peru, 30 km. north of the La Arena mine, on the west side of the Condebamba River Valley. With topography varying from rolling hills to steep ravines, its elevation ranges from 2,400-3,600 meters above sea level. The World Wildlife Fund has designated this area as neo-tropical Peruvian "Yungas."

The mine's technical report dated January 2016 reflects Measured and Indicated oxide resources of 143.1 million tonnes with an average gold grade of .50 g/t, containing 2.28 million ounces of gold. Proven and Probable oxide reserves total 111.9 million tonnes with an average grade of .53 g/t, containing 1.91 million ounces of gold. Mineral reserves increased 87 percent over the previous technical report.

=== Timmins West Gold Mine ===
In the 2016 merger between Tahoe Resources and Lake Shore Gold, Tahoe Resources acquired the Timmins West mine, located 18 km. west of Timmins, Ontario, Canada, which in 2013 was ranked the 8th largest gold-producing region in the world. The mine contains three deposits: the Timmins deposit, which has been in commercial production since January 2011; the Thunder Creek deposit, which achieved commercial production in January 2012; and the 144 Gap deposit, approximately 600 meters from the Thunder Creek deposit, which is under development as of this writing, with commercial production expected in 2017. All three deposits are connected by underground drifts.

The mine is located on one of the world's most prolific gold camps, and the mine property comprises an area of about 14.5 square km. Ore from the mine is accessed using mobile equipment via internal ramps both from the surface and the main shaft. The mine currently produces 2,700 tonnes per day of ore, which is trucked to the Bell Creek mill, 42 km. away, for processing.

In 2015, the mine produced 139,000 ounces of gold from 1,011,000 tonnes processed at an average gold grade of 4.4 g/t. In January 2016, Probable mineral reserves came to 2.9 million tonnes with an average gold grade of 4.2 g/t, containing 392,000 ounces of gold.

In January 2017 Tahoe reported it had discovered significant extensions of mineralization in the 144 Trend, deep Timmins West, Bell Creek, Vogel, Whitney and Gold River zones in the Timmins district of Canada.

=== Bell Creek Complex ===
The Bell Creek Complex was acquired by Tahoe Resources, Inc. in the merger with Lake Shore Gold in 2016. It is located approximately 20 km. northeast of Timmins, Ontario, and consists of an underground gold mine and a processing facility.

In January 2015, the mine produced 39,700 ounces of gold from processing 296,200 tonnes at an average grade of 4.4 g/t. As of January 1, 2016, Measured and Indicated Mineral Resources for the Bell Creek deposit totaled 4.8 million tonnes with an average gold grade of 4.4 g/t containing 680,000 ounces of gold. Proven and Probable Mineral Reserves (inclusive of Mineral Resources) are 2.1 million tonnes with an average gold grade of 4.5 g/t containing 309,000 ounces of gold. A large resource at depth indicates a near-term opportunity to expand production and extend the mine's life.

The mill features a conventional gold mill circuit, with crushing and grinding followed by carbon-in-leach and carbon-in-pulp processes for gold recovery. A portion of gold is recovered by gravity before the leaching process.

== Awards ==
Tahoe Resources has received the following awards:

- Mid-cap winner, Best sustainability, ethics and environmental governance program, Canadian Society of Corporate Secretaries (CSCS), 2015
- Precious Metals and Mining TopGun CEO awarded to Kevin McArthur, Brendan Wood International, 2015/2016
- Precious Metals and Mining TopGun Company, Brendan Wood International, 2015/2016
- Precious Metals and Mining TopGun Board, Brendan Wood International, 2015/2016

== Alleged Role in Violence Related to Escobal Mine in 2013 ==
Local residents' resistance to the Escobal silver mine project led to violent clashes in Spring 2013. Fears about pollution and water contamination, and about potentially damaging effects to the way of life in the area, which is primarily agricultural, caused many local residents to protest the mine's development. The surrounding communities voted against the project in 2011, but the vote was non-binding, and development proceeded.

In April 2013, a series of protests began among residents of San Rafael on the public road near the mine. On April 27, seven people were shot when security guards working at the Escobal mine opened fire on 20 protesters. In a release issued on May 1, 2013, Tahoe Resources stated that the protesters were armed with machetes. The media reported that Alberto Rotondo, Tahoe Resources' Security Chief for the Escobal project, was caught in a wiretap giving direct orders to murder local opponents of Tahoe's mining project. On April 30, Rotondo was arrested at La Aurora Airport in Guatemala City, apparently trying to flee. Rotondo was criminally charged in Guatemala with obstruction of justice, causing minor and serious injuries, and mistreatment of a minor.

Rotondo no longer works for Tahoe Resources.

The seven men who were shot filed a civil lawsuit (Garcia v. Tahoe Resources Inc.) against Tahoe Resources in June 2014, alleging that Rotondo ordered the shooting and that Tahoe Resources was legally responsible for the shooting. The suit alleged assault, aggravated assault, and obstruction of justice, and that the shooting was premeditated. On November 9, 2015, the Supreme Court of British Columbia stayed a judgment in favour of Tahoe Resources.

The coverage of the human rights violations caused a crash in stock value for the company.

== Key people ==
- Kevin McArthur, founder and executive chair
- Ron Clayton, president and chief executive officer
- Elizabeth McGregor, vice president and chief financial officer
- Brian Brodsky, VP of exploration
- Tom Fudge, VP of operations
- Edie Hofmeister, VP of corporate affairs
- Charles V. Muerhoff, VP of technical services
- Mark Sadler, VP of project development
- Mark Utting, VP of investor relations
- Peter Van Alphen, VP of operations, Timmins

== Board of directors ==
- Kevin McArthur, executive chair
- Ron Clayton, president and chief executive officer, director
- A. Dan Rovig, lead director
- Tanya Jakusconek
- Drago Kisic
- Alan C. Moon
- Paul B. Sweeney
- James S. Voorhees
- Kenneth F. Williamson
- Dr. Klaus Zeitler

== Offices ==
- Vancouver, Canada
- Reno, Nevada, USA
- Lima, Peru
- Guatemala City, Guatemala
- Toronto, Canada

== See also ==
- Escobal mine
