= Xico, Valle de Chalco =

Xico
- Municipality seat
- Interactive map of Xico
- Coordinates: 19°17′30″N 98°56′20″W
- Country: Mexico
- State: Mexico
- Municipality: Valle de Chalco

Government
  - Municipal president: Wilfredo Torres González (PRD)

Population (2020)
  - Total: 384,327
- Time zone: UTC-6 (CST)

Xico is a city in the State of Mexico, Mexico. It serves as the municipal seat of Valle de Chalco municipality, with which it is, for all practical purposes, coterminous. The municipality lies adjacent to the east side of the Federal District (Distrito Federal) and is part of the Mexico City metropolitan area. The city and municipality lie on the old lakebed of Lake Chalco, which was drained like much of the Basin of Mexico.

The city name comes from the nearby Xico hill (Cerro de Xico) and the name of the municipality comes from the old lake plus a reference to the "Programa Nacional de Solidaridad" (National Program of Solidarity) which was initiated here. The municipality's glyph and shield make reference to both names. It is a distinct entity from the city and municipality of Chalco, which is nearby. "Chalco" in both names refers to the Chalca tribe that were one of the original inhabitants of the area.

== History ==
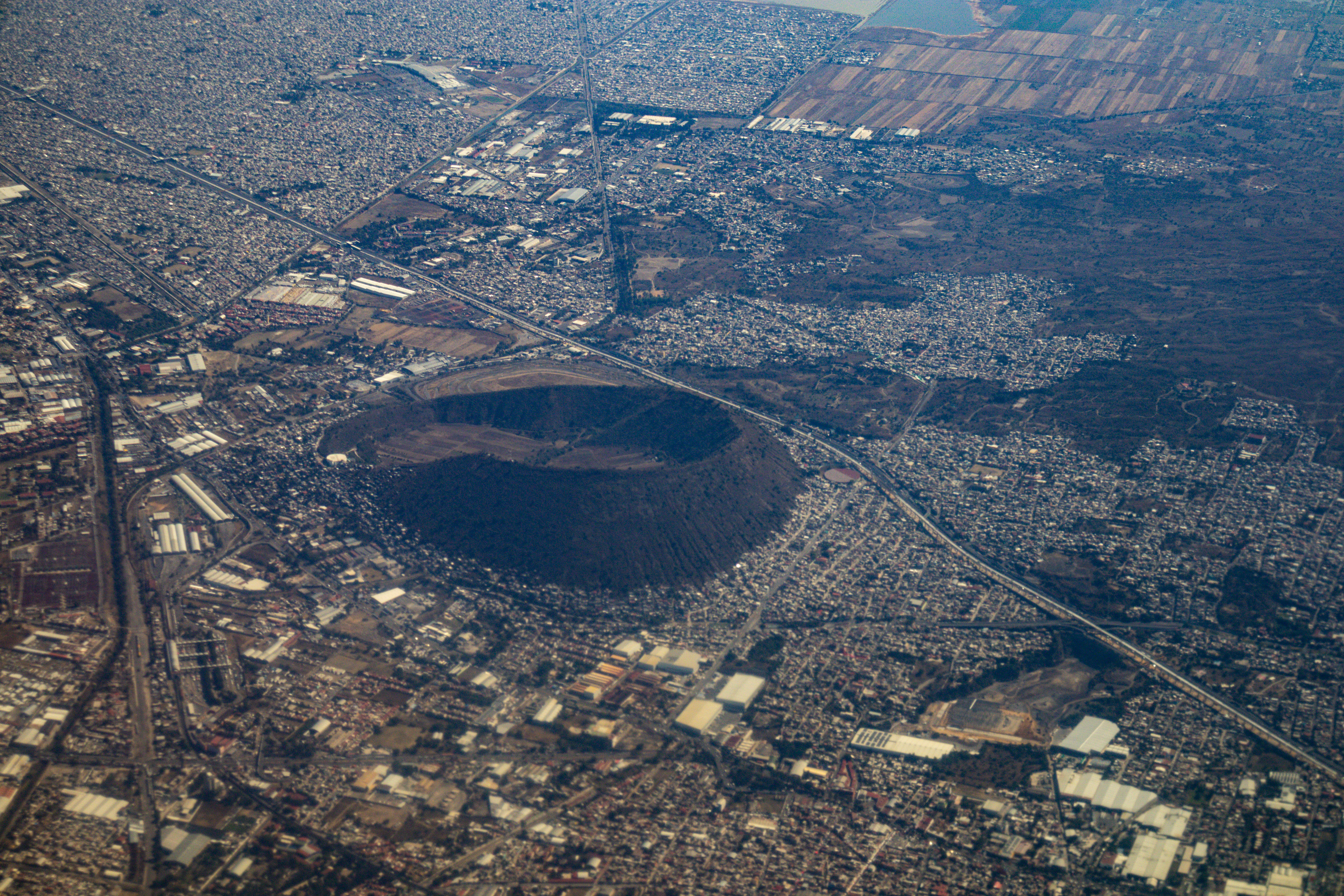
Cerro de Xico city from above

Early pre-Hispanic history refers to the area around the Cerro de Xico as the Island of Xico as most of the modern city was underwater until relatively recently. The area was mostly fishing villages from 900 BC to 100 AD. However, from 550 to 650, the area was dominated by the Teotihuacan culture. From 650 to 750, an Otomi settlement gained prominence. The Acxotecas arrived around 1328, the same time that chinampa farming began here. Xico was conquered by the Aztec Tezozomoc in 1381, after which groups of Mexicas settle here extending the chinampa farming system in the 14th and 15th centuries. The area was ceded to Hernán Cortés by the Spanish king in 1529. The modern area began in the 19th century when Porfirio Díaz ordered the draining of Lake Chalco which devastated the economies of the former coastline communities. The Mexican Revolution tried to compensate these communities by the creation of ejidos, the two largest here being Estación Xico with 507 hectares and San Miguel Xico with 250 hectares. These ejidos, as well as the present-day city and municipality, rest almost entirely on former lakebed.

For the most part, the area laid barren until the late 1970s, when there was a sudden influx of families coming from the central and southern parts of Mexico in search of land. Despite its proximity, there was no infrastructure for basic services including schooling for children. Many people bought ejido land causing legal problems. The federal government had to step in to install basic services and regularize the property rights of more than 77,000 parcels of ejido land that was sold. However, the area did not become a separate municipality until 1994. In the census of 2005 the population of Xico was 331,321 people.

The only notable sites in the area are The Cerro del Marqués which contains architecture and archeological remains but these are not open to the public. However, there is the Museo Comunitario (Community Museum) which displays local archeological finds located in the Casa de Cultura “Chalchiuhtlicue”. There is also the Ex – Hacienda de Xico which was constructed at the same time the lake was drained.

== Municipality ==
As municipal seat, Xico has governing jurisdiction over the following communities: Las Bombas, Comalchica, Santa Cruz, El Triángulo, El Invernadero, Colonia Ampliación (San Miguel Tláhuac), and Ejido Tulyehualco (Tabla Número Nueve) as well as 13 unnamed communities. It has a total population of 332,279.

The municipality borders the municipalities of Ixtapaluca, Chicoloapan, Los Reyes Acaquilpan, al oriente con Chalco de Díaz Covarrubias and borders to the south with the Distrito Federal (Delegaciones Iztapalapa y Tláhuac). It covers a total surface area of 46.36 km^{2} (17.90 sq mi).
