= Arturo Cruz Ramírez =

Mexican politician

- Born: 15 December 1952 (age 73); Mexico City, Mexico
- Occupation: Politician
- Political party: PRD

Arturo Cruz Ramírez (born 15 December 1954) is a Mexican politician affiliated with the Party of the Democratic Revolution (PRD). In the 2012 general election he was elected to the Chamber of Deputies to represent the State of Mexico's 32nd district during the 62nd session of Congress
