= Gaspar Ávila Rodríguez =

Mexican politician

- Born: 6 January 1946 (age 80); Ozumbilla, State of Mexico, Mexico
- Occupation: Politician
- Political party: PRI

Gaspar Ávila Rodríguez (born 6 January 1946) is a Mexican politician affiliated with the Institutional Revolutionary Party (PRI). He has served in the Chamber of Deputies twice: in 1994–1997, during the 56th Congress, for the State of Mexico's 32nd district; and in 2003–2006, during the 59th Congress, for the State of Mexico's fifth district.
