= Miguel Ángel Luna Munguía =

Mexican politician (1969–2015)

- Born: 17 December 1969; State of Mexico, Mexico
- Died: 2 June 2015 (aged 45); Valle de Chalco Solidaridad, State of Mexico, Mexico
- Occupation: Politician
- Political party: PRI (1990s–2003; 2009–15); PRD (2003–09; 2015)

Miguel Ángel Luna Munguía (17 December 1969 – 3 June 2015) was a Mexican politician who, at different times, was affiliated to both the Institutional Revolutionary Party (PRI) and the Party of the Democratic Revolution (PRD). From 2009 to 2012, he served in the Chamber of Deputies, representing the 32nd district of the State of Mexico during the 61st Congress.

== Life ==
Luna's political career took place entirely within Valle de Chalco Solidaridad. He graduated from the National Autonomous University of Mexico (UNAM) with a law degree in 1993 and was a member of the PRI until 2003, even serving as the municipal party president between 2002 and 2003. In 2003, he flipped to the PRD, and in that same year, he began a three-year term as municipal president. In 2006, the PRD considered running Miguel as its candidate for federal deputy but ultimately bypassed him in favor of his sister, Alma Lilia Luna Munguía, who eventually won the seat.

In 2009, after the PRD briefly considered him as a candidate to return to the municipal presidency, he returned to the PRI in time to be selected as its candidate for federal deputy to the 32nd district. This time, the PRI triumphed, sending him to San Lázaro. He was a secretary on the Citizen Participation Commission and also sat on those for the Federal District, and after November 2010, Government. In 2010, he also graduated with a diploma in administrative law from the UNAM.

In 2015, Miguel Ángel returned to the PRD in order to become its candidate for federal deputy from the 32nd district in Chalco; he would face Alma, who ran as the PRI candidate. On 2 June 2015, just five days before the election, Miguel Ángel was shot and killed in his campaign office in Valle de Chalco Solidaridad, just meters from the cathedral where his funeral mass would be held two days later; in the attack, the PRD's candidate for municipal president of Chalco was also hurt. Later in the month, the Attorney General of the State of Mexico alleged that the murderer had been paid to kill Miguel Ángel.
