= Rio Alto Mining =

Gold mining company

- Type: Public
- Traded as: TSX: RIO; NYSE: RIOM; BVL: RIO
- Industry: Gold Mining
- Founded: 2006
- Founder: Alexander Black
- Headquarters: Vancouver, British Columbia, Canada
- Revenue: $317 million [2012]
- Operating income: $153 million [2012]
- Net income: $100 million [2012]
- Parent: Tahoe Resources, Inc.
- Website: www.tahoeresources.com

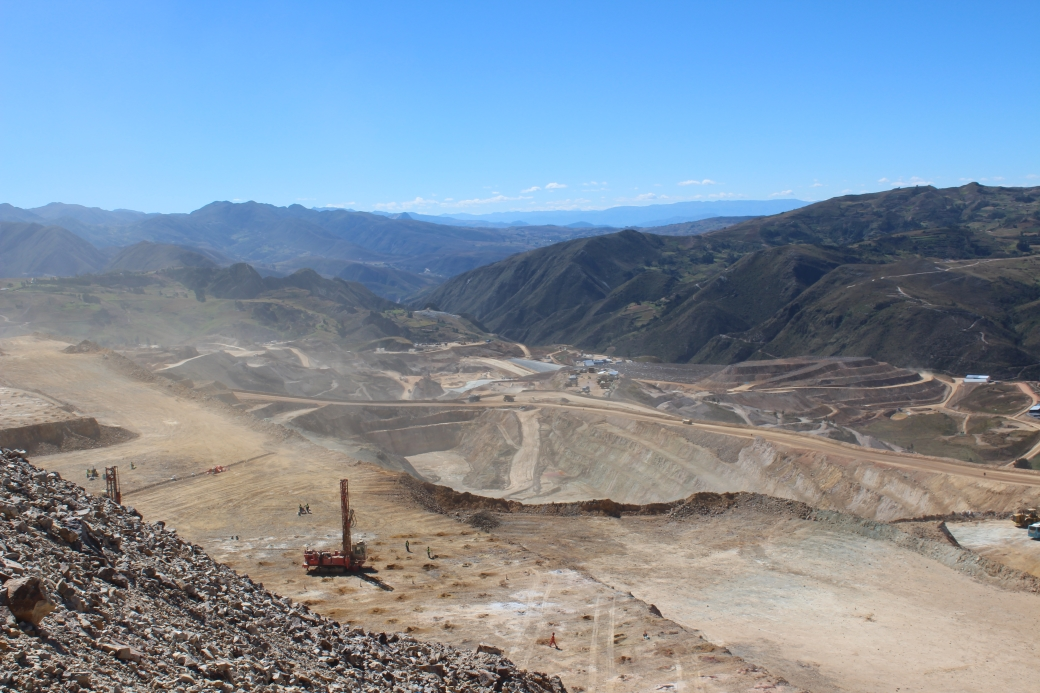
Rio Alto's La Arena Mine located near Huamachucho, La Libertad, Peru, taken from the top of the mine's Calaorco Pit, July 2013.

Rio Alto Mining was a Vancouver-based international gold producer engaged in the exploration, development, and production of mineral resource properties throughout Latin America, with its principal asset, the La Arena mine, in La Libertad Region, Peru. The company and its assets were acquired by Tahoe Resources, Inc. in 2015, and the company no longer exists.

== Operations ==
Rio Alto's annual gold production exceeded 200,000 ounces from its La Arena mine.

In 2008, Rio Alto purchased La Arena from Iamgold for $48 million. In May 2011, the company poured its first gold from operations at La Arena. Tahoe Resources announced a merger with Rio Alto Mining on February 9, 2015 for $1.12B. The merger was completed on April 1, 2015.
