= Salvador Castañeda Salcedo =

Mexican politician

- Born: 20 November 1957 (age 68); Jalisco, Mexico
- Occupation: Politician
- Political party: PRI

Salvador Castañeda Salcedo (born 20 November 1957) is a Mexican politician from the Institutional Revolutionary Party (PRI). In the 2000 general election he was elected to the Chamber of Deputies to represent the State of Mexico's 32nd district during the 58th session of Congress.
