= Escobal mine =

Silver mine in Guatemala

- Location: Santa Rosa Department, Guatemala
- Products: silver, lead, and gold

The Escobal mine is a large silver mine located east of San Rafael Las Flores in the south of Guatemala in Santa Rosa Department. Escobal represents one of the largest silver reserve not just in Guatemala but in the world, having estimated reserves of 367.5 million oz of silver. Exploration was by Goldcorp beginning in 2007. The mine was sold to Tahoe Resources in 2011. In April 2013 the mine was granted a 25 year license. The local Xinca people have led protests opposing the Escobal mine, raising issues of environmental risks and land sovereignty rights, but the protests have been suppressed by the Guatemalan government.
