= Salinas de Gortari =

Salinas de Gortari is a surname. Notable people with the surname include:

- Carlos Salinas de Gortari (born 1948), Mexican engineer and politician, former President of Mexico
- Raúl Salinas de Gortari (born 1946), Mexican civil engineer and businessman, brother of Carlos
