= Valle de Chalco =

Valle de Chalco Solidaridad
- Municipality
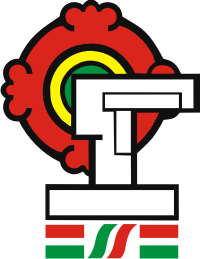
- Coat of arms

- Location of Valle de Chalco Solidaridad in the State of Mexico
- Coordinates: 19°17′30″N 98°56′20″W
- Country: Mexico
- State: State of Mexico
- Region: Amecameca
- Metro area: Greater Mexico City
- Municipal Status: November 9, 1994
- Municipal Seat: Xico

Government
  - Type: Ayuntamiento
  - Municipal President: Armando García Méndez (2022-2024)

Area
  - Land: 46.53 km^{2} (17.97 sq mi)
  - Water: 2.76 km^{2} (1.07 sq mi)
- Elevation (of seat): 2,240 m (7,350 ft)

Population (2020)
  - Municipality: 391,731
  - Density: 8,400/km^{2} (21,760/sq mi)
- Time zone: UTC-6 (CST)
- Postal code (of seat): 56610
- Area code: 55
- Demonym: Vallechalquense
- Website: Official website (in Spanish)

Valle de Chalco, officially named Valle de Chalco Solidaridad, is a municipality located in the State of Mexico, Mexico, on the eastern outskirts of the metropolitan area of Mexico City. Formerly part of the municipality of Chalco, it was split off as a separate entity in 1994, during the presidency of Salinas de Gortari, under his National Solidarity Program (Programa Nacional de Solidaridad). The municipality lies on the old bed of Lake Chalco, which was substantially drained in the nineteenth century. Technically, the municipal seat is Xico, after a high point of land that once formed an island, and now remains as a small hill within an otherwise monotonous, urban expanse. "Chalco" refers to the Chalca tribe, whose territory covered the area around the lake, prior to the Spanish conquest of the Aztec Empire.

As of 2006, Chalco included part of the world's largest mega-slum, along with Ciudad Nezahualcoyotl and Ixtapaluca.

== History ==
=== Pre-Columbian history ===
Archeologists date human settlement around Lake Chalco from about 2400 B.C, but major settlement occurred at approximately 1240 B.C., when the first tribe to call itself Chalca migrated to the region. This tribe was followed by others, ethnically and linguistically diverse, who added the name Chalca to their own. By 1410 the Chalca territory had developed into a loose confederation, divided into four, semi-sovereign domains. In the early 14th century the Mexica tribe of the Aztecs settled in nearby territory and began to build their city of Tenochitlan, now Mexico City. Over time, the Chalcas and Mexicas engaged in a number of ritual wars, known as Xōchiyaoyōtl or Flower Wars. During the Spanish conquest of the Aztec Empire, the Chalca allied themselves with Hernán Cortés and his troops.

=== Modern history ===
Under the presidency of Porfirio Díaz, much of the drained lake bed formed part of a latifundia, the Hacienda de Xico. Following the Mexican Revolution, land ownership was reformed into the ejido system of communal ownership, and was utilized primarily for dairy farming by the communal owners, or ejidatarios. This began to change near the end of the 1970s, as hundreds of homesteaders, generally from Mexico City and adjacent urbanized areas, descended upon the region. Most purchased their homestead plots illegally from ejidatarios. The new settlement grew despite the lack of basic infrastructure, such as potable water, sewers, electricity, public transport, medical services and schools. It was only with the initiation of the Programa Nacional de Solidaridad, in 1988, that the federal government began to install basic services and, ultimately, regularize the tenancy of 77,000 homesteads.

During the decades of the 1980s and 1990s, Valle de Chalco expanded dramatically in population; by 1995 the city had 287,073 residents. Growth has since slowed, as undeveloped land becomes less available; in 2005, there were 332,279 residents. By the 2010 census it had grown to 357,645.

== Towns and villages ==
Localities (cities, towns, and villages) are:

Name	2010 Census Population
Xico	356,352
Colonia Ampliación (San Miguel Tláhuac)	742
Santa Cruz	228
El Triángulo	203
Comalchica	109
Ejido Tulyehualco (Tabla Número Nueve)	8
El Invernadero	3
Las Bombas	0
Total Municipality	357,645
