= Glamis Gold =

Former US gold producer company

- Company type: Public company
- Traded as: Formerly TSX: ARG and NYSE: GLG
- Industry: Gold mining
- Predecessor: Rennick Resources
- Founded: 1972; 53 years ago in Vancouver, Canada
- Defunct: August 31, 2006
- Fate: Acquired
- Successor: Goldcorp
- Headquarters: Reno, Nevada, United States
- Area served: Americas
- Products: Gold mining

Glamis Gold Ltd. was a Reno, Nevada-based gold producer with operations in the Americas. The company’s gold producing projects include the Rand mine in California, the Marigold mine in Nevada, and the San Martin mine in Honduras. Glamis pioneered the heap leach method of gold extraction.

== History ==
The company was founded in 1972 as Rennick Resources Ltd, a mineral exploration company based in Vancouver, Canada. After several reorganizations the company name was changed to Glamis Gold in 1977. It headquarters were moved to Nevada in the United States to make it easier to make mining claims in California.

In 1990’s, Glamis proposed a new project in California that would be a large, open-pit, cyanide heap-leach gold mine, a mining process that had been banned by a number of countries due to its environmental destructive impact. In 2001, following a six-year review process, including extensive public comment, the United States Department of the Interior denied a permit for the mine. The company went on to challenge the decision through the courts.

In 2006 the company produced 620,000 ounces of gold at a total cash cost of US$190 per ounce.

On 31 August 2006, Goldcorp (NYSE stock symbol GG) announced the acquisition of Glamis Gold (NYSE former symbol GLG) for US$8.6 billion, creating one of the world's largest gold mining companies with combined assets (in 2006) of US$21.3 billion. The takeover was completed in November 2006.

== See also ==
- Gold as an investment
- Gold mining
