= People Power =

"People power" is a political term.

People power or People Power may refer to:

- People Power Revolution, the Philippine Revolution of 1986
  - People Power Monument a monument in Quezon City commemorating the revolution
- 8888 Uprising in Myanmar, also known as the People Power Uprising in 1988
- People Power Party (disambiguation), several political parties
- People Power, Our Power, or People Power Movement, a Ugandan resistance pressure group
- People Power Company (or People Power), an American technology company
- People & Power, a current affairs TV programme on Al Jazeera English
- the term given by Indonesians for May 2019 Jakarta protests and riots as an effort to step down Joko Widodo from his presidency
- People Power: the Game of Civil Resistance, video game
- Ganashakti (lit. 'People's Power'), a newspaper of the Communist Party of India (Marxist)
- Jansatta (lit. 'People's Power'), an Indian Hindi-language newspaper published by the Indian Express Group
- Janashakti (lit. 'People's Power'), a publication of the Communist Party of India
- Loksatta (lit. 'People's Power'), an Indian Marathi-language newspaper published by the Indian Express Group
- Lok Shakti (lit. 'People's Power'), a political party in India
- Prajasakti (lit. 'People's Power'), an Indian Telugu-language newspaper
- Communist Party of India (Marxist–Leninist) Janashakti, former communist party in India, merged into Communist Party of India (Marxist–Leninist) Class Struggle
- Lok Satta Movement (India)

== See also ==
- People's Power (disambiguation)
- People Power Party (disambiguation)
- People's Power Party (disambiguation)
- Peoples Power Assemblies, an advocacy group based in Manhattan, New York
- People Powered Vehicle
- Power to the People (disambiguation)
- National Assembly of People’s Power, the legislative parliament of the Republic of Cuba
