= Civil resistance =

Political action that relies on the use of non-violent methods by civil groups

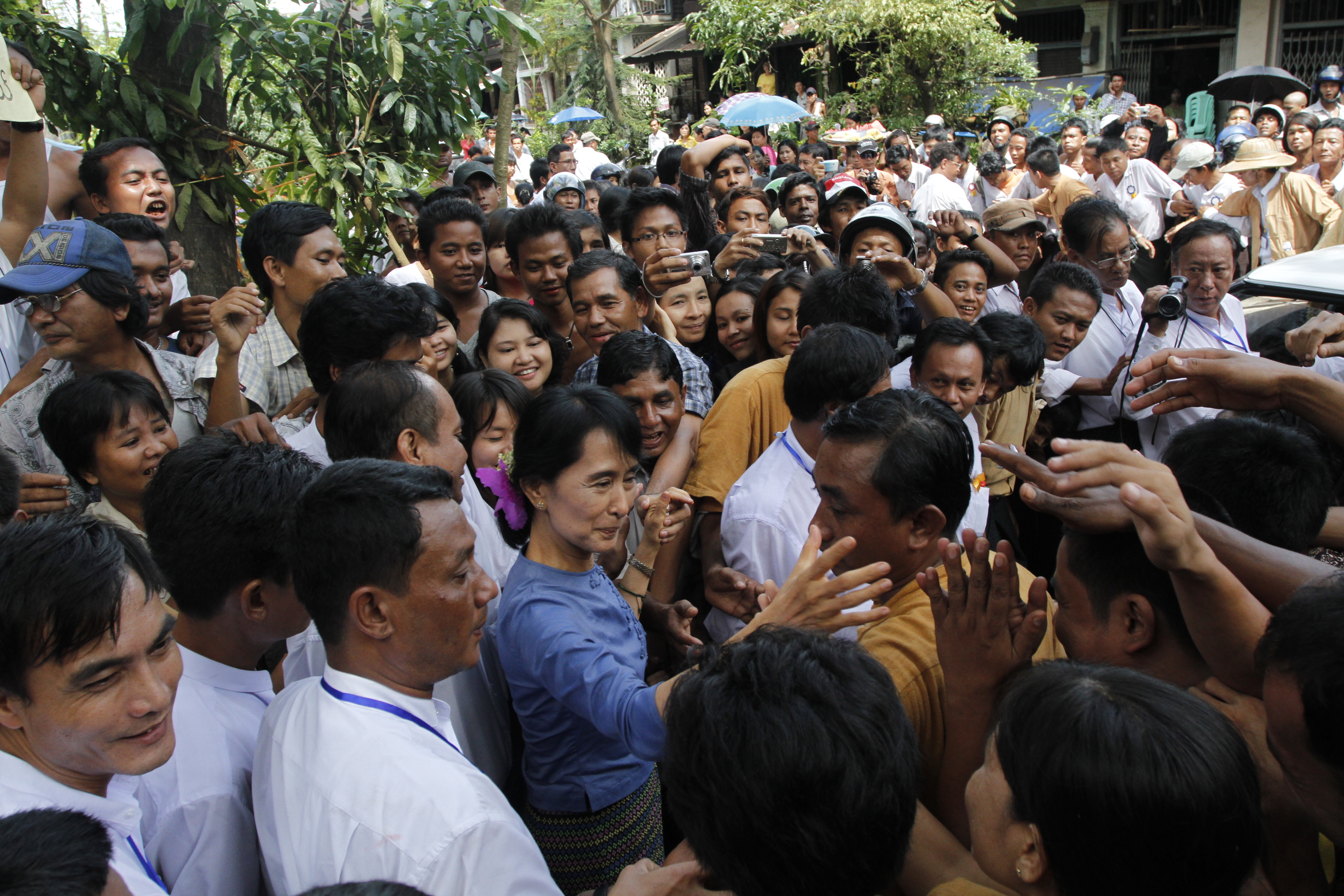
Aung San Suu Kyi, Burmese pro-democracy leader, greeting supporters from Bago State, Burma, 14 August 2011. She has stated that she was attracted to nonviolent civil resistance, not on moral grounds, but "on practical political grounds". Photo: Htoo Tay Zar

Civil resistance is a form of political action that relies on the use of nonviolent resistance by ordinary people to challenge a particular power, force, policy or regime. Civil resistance operates through appeals to the adversary, pressure and coercion: it can involve systematic attempts to undermine or expose the adversary's sources of power (or pillars of support, such as police, military, clergy, business elite, etc.). Forms of action have included demonstrations, vigils and petitions; strikes, go-slows, boycotts and emigration movements; and sit-ins, occupations, constructive program, and the creation of parallel institutions of government.

Some civil resistance movements' motivations for avoiding violence are generally related to context, including a society's values and its experience of war and violence, rather than to any absolute ethical principle. Civil resistance cases can be found throughout history and in many modern struggles, against both tyrannical rulers and democratically elected governments. Mahatma Gandhi led the first documented civil resistance campaign (using three primary tactics: civil disobedience, marches, and creation of parallel institutions) to free India from British imperialism. The phenomenon of civil resistance is often associated with the advancement of human rights and democracy.

== Historical examples ==
Civil resistance is a long-standing and widespread phenomenon in human history. Several works on civil resistance adopt a historical approach to the analysis of the subject. Cases of civil resistance, both successful and unsuccessful, include:

- Mahatma Gandhi's role in the Indian independence movement in 1917–1947
- Martin Luther King Jr.'s, James Bevel's, and other activists' roles in the Civil Rights Movement in 1955–1968
- Aspects of the Northern Ireland civil rights movement in 1967–1972
- a variety of raids on U. S. draft boards to protest the war in Vietnam, 1967-1971
- the Revolution of the Carnations in Portugal in 1974–75, supporting the military coup of 25 April 1974
- the Iranian Revolution in 1977–1979, before Khomeini's advent to power in February 1979
- the Polish Solidarity Trade Union used civil resistance to protest against the Soviet controlled government, even after delegalization and numerous crackdowns.
- the People Power Revolution in the Philippines in the 1980s that ousted President Ferdinand Marcos
- the campaigns against apartheid in South Africa, especially before 1961, and during the period of 1983–1994.
- the mass mobilization against authoritarian rule in Pinochet's Chile, 1983–1988
- the Tiananmen Square protests of 1989 in China
- the various movements contributing to the revolutions of 1989 in central and eastern Europe
- the 1988–1990 Singing Revolution that led to the restoration of independence of the three Soviet-occupied Baltic countries
- the campaign against Serbian domination in Kosovo, 1990–1998, that was followed by war
- the revolutions in Serbia in 2000, Georgia in 2003, and Ukraine in 2004, all of which involved successful resistance against an incumbent government that had refused to acknowledge its defeat in an election and had sought to falsify the election results
- the Cedar Revolution in Lebanon in 2005, following the assassination of former prime minister Rafic Hariri on 14 February 2005, and calling for Syrian military withdrawal from Lebanon
- the demonstrations, mainly led by students and monks, in the Saffron Revolution in Burma in 2007
- the 2009 Iranian presidential election protests following evidence of electoral manipulation in the elections of June 2009

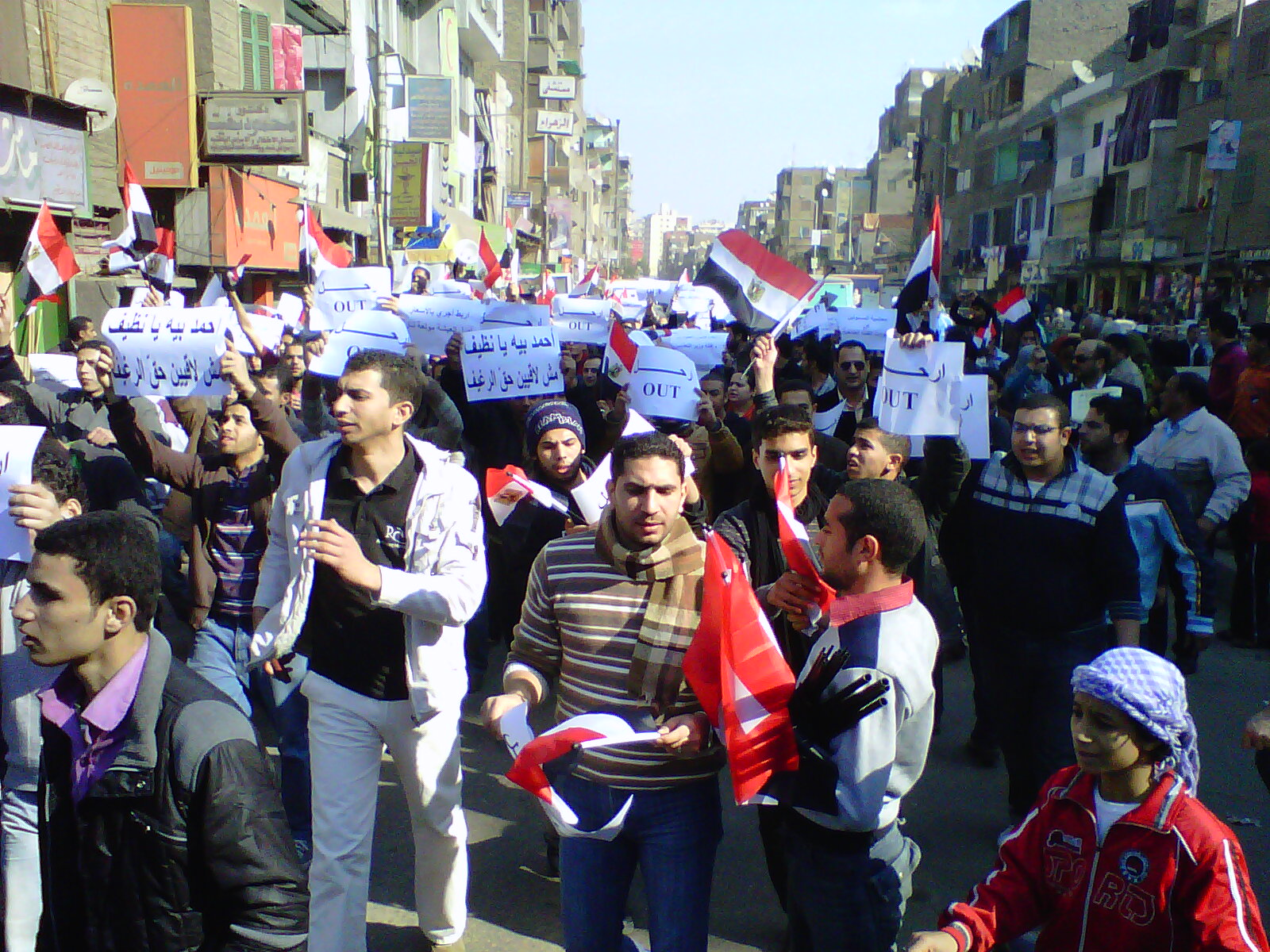
Egypt, 25 January 2011: marchers in Cairo with 'OUT' signs on the 'Day of Anger' against President Mubarak. On 11 February he left office.

- the Arab Spring uprisings in the Middle East and North Africa, starting in Tunisia in December 2010, and resulting, in 2011, in the fall of rulers in Tunisia, Egypt, Libya and Yemen. In some countries the movements were followed by war (e.g. Syrian Civil War and War in Yemen) or by a return to military rule, as in Egypt in 2013 following the Egyptian Revolution of 2011
- the 15-M or Indignados movement, which included the peaceful occupation of squares all over Spain in May–June 2011, and a mosaic of other forms of civil disobedience by many of the groups that were created, or strengthened, after the squares occupations. In particular the Platform for People Affected by Mortgages, or PAH.
- the Gezi Park protests in Turkey in 2013, in opposition to urban development plans, and also to government encroachments on freedom of expression and on Turkey's secularist traditions
- the early phases of the Euromaidan protests in Ukraine in 2013–14, demanding closer integration with European Union countries, and the resignation of President Viktor Yanukovych. Various tactics of unarmed civil resistance were also frequently employed in the Russian-occupied settlements during the 2022 Russian invasion of Ukraine.
- the 2014 Hong Kong protests, also known as "Occupy Central" and the "Umbrella movement", opposing the 2014–15 Hong Kong electoral reform in the Hong Kong Special Administrative Region.
- Women's marches in USA from January 2017 Women's March onwards to resist President Donald Trump's sexist statements.
- Extinction Rebellion (XR), established in May 2018. An international nonviolent movement with three climate and ecological emergency demands and 10 Principles and Values.
- the 2018–2019 Gaza border protests near the Gaza-Israel border, demanding that Palestinian refugees be allowed to return to the lands they were displaced from in what is now Israel

Numerous additional campaigns, both successful and unsuccessful, have been documented in various lists and databases. In 1967, Gene Sharp compiled a list of 84 cases,[1] followed by further surveys.[2] In 2013, Maciej Bartkowski published a list of cases from the preceding 200 years, organized alphabetically by country.[3] The International Center on Nonviolent Conflict (ICNC) maintains a Resource Library[4] containing case studies and other materials on civil resistance campaigns, movements, and their dynamics. Its blog, Minds of the Movement,[5] also features material on civil resistance throughout history and in contemporary contexts. Swarthmore College's Global Nonviolent Action Database[6] provides another resource, documenting hundreds of civil resistance campaigns and movements.

== Effectiveness ==
It is not easy to devise a method of proving the relative success of different methods of struggle. Often there are problems in identifying a given campaign as successful or otherwise. In 2008 Maria J. Stephan and Erica Chenoweth produced a widely noted article on "Why Civil Resistance Works", the most thorough and detailed analysis (to that date) of the rate of success of civil resistance campaigns, as compared to violent resistance campaigns. After looking at over 300 cases of both types of campaign, from 1900 to 2006, they concluded that "nonviolent resistance methods are more likely to be successful than violent methods in achieving strategic objectives". Their article (later developed into a book) noted particularly that "resistance campaigns that compel loyalty shifts among security forces and civilian bureaucrats are likely to succeed". These findings have been highly influential within environmental and social movements, although their pertinence to campaigns not involving regime change has been questioned by researchers such as Kyle R. Matthews.

On the other hand, the evidence of several of the 2011 uprisings in the Middle East and North Africa appears to provide contrasting pathways by which this logic may fail to materialise, with splits in the armed forces contributing towards civil war in Libya and Syria, and a shift in armed forces loyalty in Egypt failing to contribute towards enduring democratic reform. Criticisms of the central thesis of the book on Why Civil Resistance Works have included:

1. Forming judgements about whether a campaign is a success or failure is inherently difficult: the answer may depend on the time-frame used, and on necessarily subjective judgments about what constitutes success. Some of the authors' decisions on this are debatable. Similar difficulties arise in deciding whether a campaign is violent or nonviolent, when on the ground both strategies may co-exist in several ways.
2. Regimes transitioning from autocracy to democracy tend to be highly unstable, so an initial success for a movement may be followed by a more general failure.
3. Perhaps, more generally, sufficient account is not taken of the possibility that violence often takes place in circumstances that were already violent and chaotic, stacking the odds against any successful outcome for violence.

In July 2020, Erica Chenoweth's new research was published in the Journal of Democracy, in which she finds that the success rates of civil resistance have been dropping since the beginning of the 2010s. Some of the reasons identified include the authoritarian learning curve and over-reliance of activists on digital forms of organizing such as social media campaigns. What's more, the COVID-19 pandemic which began in 2020 led large numbers of movements worldwide to cancel public actions and instead shift focus on internal priorities, such as strategic planning.

== Reasons for choosing to use civil resistance ==
Some leaders of civil resistance struggles have urged the use of nonviolent methods for primarily ethical reasons, while others have emphasized practical considerations. Some have indicated that both of these types of factor have to be taken into account – and that they necessarily overlap.

In his chapter on "Pilgrimage to Nonviolence" Martin Luther King Jr. gave a notably multi-faceted account of the various considerations, experiences and influences that constituted his "intellectual odyssey to nonviolence". By 1954 this had led to the intellectual conviction that "nonviolent resistance was one of the most potent weapons available to oppressed people in their quest for social justice."

Some have opted for civil resistance when they were in opposition to the government, but then have later, when in government, adopted or accepted very different policies and methods of action. For example, in one of her BBC Reith Lectures, first broadcast in July 2011, Aung San Suu Kyi, the pro-democracy campaigner in Myanmar (formerly Burma), stated: "Gandhi's teachings on nonviolent civil resistance and the way in which he had put his theories into practice have become part of the working manual of those who would change authoritarian administrations through peaceful means. I was attracted to the way of non-violence, but not on moral grounds, as some believe. Only on practical political grounds." Subsequently, as State Counsellor of Myanmar from 2016 onwards, she incurred much criticism, especially in connection with the failure to prevent, and to condemn, the killings and expulsions of the Rohingya people in Rakhine State.

== Relationship to other forms of power ==
The experience of civil resistance suggests that it can at least partially replace other forms of power. Some have seen civil resistance as offering, potentially, a complete alternative to power politics. The core vision is of nonviolent methods replacing armed force in many or all of its forms.

Several writers, while sharing the vision of civil resistance as progressively overcoming the use of force, have warned against a narrowly instrumental view of nonviolent action. For example, Joan V. Bondurant, a specialist on the Gandhian philosophy of conflict, indicated concern about "the symbolic violence of those who engage in conflict with techniques which they, at least, perceive to be nonviolent." She saw Gandhian satyagraha as a form of "creative conflict" and as "contrasted both to violence and to methods not violent or just short of violence".

It is generally difficult in practice to separate out entirely the use of civil resistance and power-political considerations of various kinds. One frequently-encountered aspect of this problem is that regimes facing opposition taking the form of civil resistance often launch verbal attacks on the opposition in terms designed to suggest that civil resistance is simply a front for more sinister forces. It has sometimes been attacked as being planned and directed from abroad, and as intimately connected to terrorism, imperialism, communism etc. A classic case was the Soviet accusation that the 1968 Prague Spring, and the civil resistance after the Soviet-led invasion of August 1968, were the result of Western machinations. Similarly, President Bashar al-Assad of Syria, in March 2011, accused "enemies" of using "very sophisticated tools" to undermine Syria's stability; and President Vladimir Putin of Russia, in speeches in 2014, described events in Ukraine and the Arab countries as foreign-influenced. Such accusations of sinister power-political involvement are often presented without convincing evidence.

There can be some more plausible connections between civil resistance and other forms of power. Although civil resistance can sometimes be a substitute for other forms of power, it can also operate in conjunction with them. Such conjunction is never problem-free. Michael Randle has identified a core difficulty regarding strategies that seek to combine the use of violent and nonviolent methods in the same campaign: "The obvious problem about employing a mixed strategy in the course of an actual struggle is that the dynamics of military and civil resistance are at some levels diametrically opposed to each other." However, the connections between civil resistance and other forms of power are not limited to the idea of a "mixed strategy". They can assume many forms. Eight ways in which civil resistance can in practice relate to other forms of power are identified here, with examples in each case:

1. Civil resistance is often a response to changes in constellations of power. Leaders of civil resistance campaigns have often been acutely aware of power-political developments, both domestic and international. In some countries there has been a growth of civil opposition after, and perhaps in part because of, an occupying or colonial state's internal political turmoil or setbacks in war: for example, this was a key factor in the Finnish struggle of 1898–1905 against Russian control. In other countries the problems faced by their own armed forces, whether against conventional armies or guerrillas, played some part in the development of civil resistance: for example, in the People Power Revolution in the Philippines in 1983–86.
2. Civil resistance campaigns frequently lead to a situation of partial stalemate, in which negotiation between civil resisters and those in positions of governmental power is perceived as essential. Hence, "round table talks" were critically important in the Indian independence struggle up to 1947, in Solidarity's campaign in Poland up to 1989, and in Ukraine in 2004.
3. The relation between civil resistance and the military coup d'état can be especially multi-faceted. In some cases a civil resistance campaign has been an effective response to a military coup. In other cases a campaign could succeed in its final objective—e.g. the removal of a hated regime—only when there was the reality or the threat of a military coup to bring about the desired change. Thus, the 1963 Buddhist crisis in South Vietnam a long civil resistance campaign against the government resulted in change only when the South Vietnamese army coup of 1–2 November 1963 toppled President Ngo Dinh Diem. In Egypt in June–July 2013, a civil resistance movement in effect called for a military coup: peaceful demonstrators and a petition supported by millions of signatures demanded the replacement of the elected Muslim Brotherhood government, and provided a degree of revolutionary legitimacy for the army take-over of 3 July 2013. At least one nonviolent campaign, the Revolution of the Carnations in Portugal in 1974–75, was in support of a military coup that had already occurred: this campaign helped to steer Portugal in a democratic direction.
4. Some nonviolent campaigns can be seen as reluctant or unwitting harbingers of violence. They may be followed by the emergence of groups using armed force and/or by military intervention from outside the territory concerned. This can happen if, for example, they (a) are perceived as failures, or (b) are repressed with extreme violence, or (c) succeed in removing a regime but then leave a power vacuum in its place. Processes of the first two of these kinds happened, for example, in Northern Ireland in 1967–72 and in Kosovo in the 1990s. Processes of the third kind, involving some forms of power vacuum, included Libya from 2011 onwards, and Yemen from 2012 onwards. The possibility of such developments can be an inducement to a government to bargain with a nonviolent movement before things get out of hand. However, in several countries in the Middle East and North Africa in 2011 and after, campaigns by civil resistance movements were followed by violent internal conflict and civil war, often with the involvement of external forces: Syria is the most tragic case.
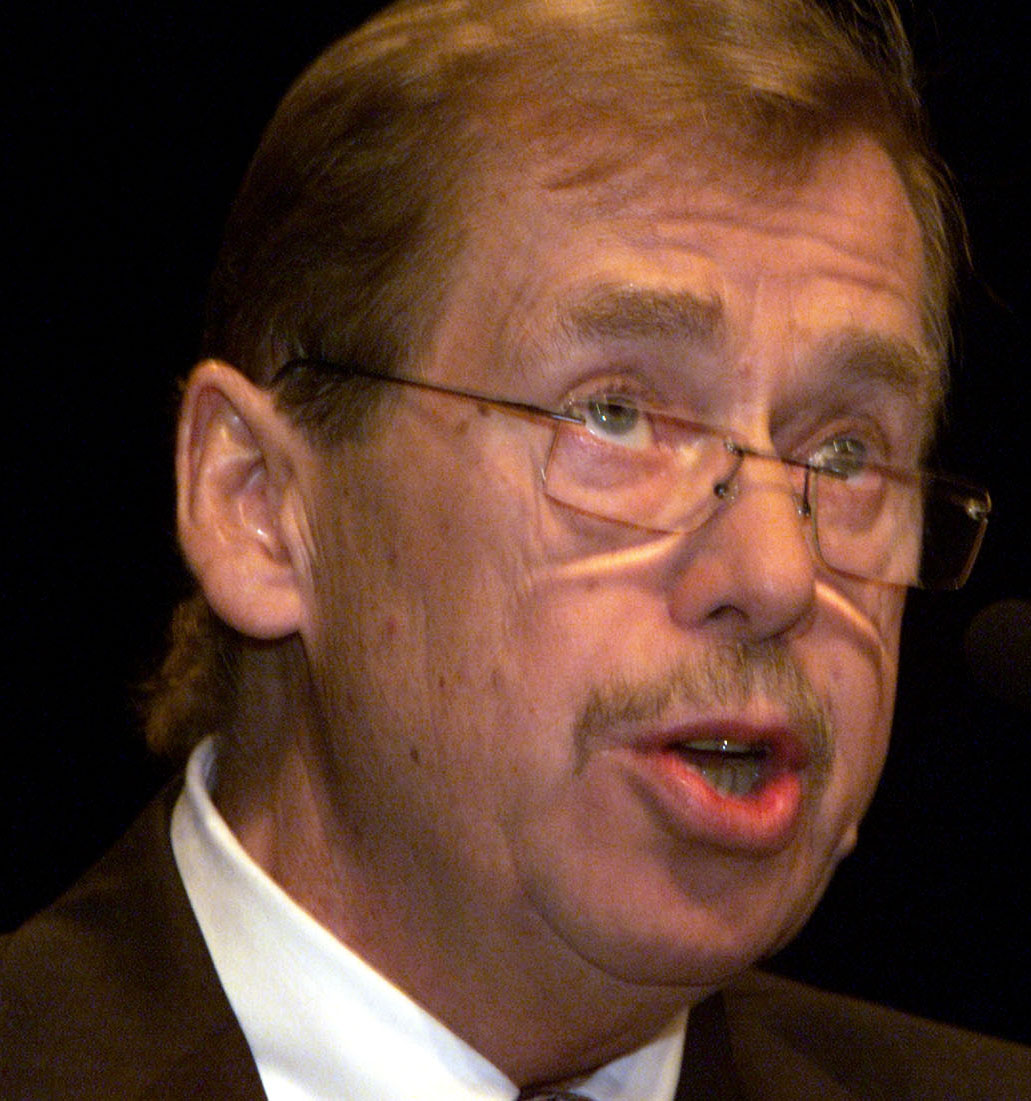
  Václav Havel, impresario of civil resistance in the years leading up to the 1989 Velvet Revolution. In April 1991, as President of post-Communist Czechoslovakia, he praised the NATO military alliance; and on 12 March 1999 the Czech Republic (with Havel still as president) joined the alliance. He is seen here on 26 September 2000. Photo: IMF
5. There have also been some cases of certain uses of force by civil resistance movements, whether against their adversaries, or to maintain internal discipline. For example, on 2 February 2011, in the generally peaceful Egyptian struggle against President Mubarak, some groups among the crowds in Tahrir Square in Cairo did use certain forms of force for a defensive purpose when they were attacked by pro-regime thugs, some of whom were riding on horses and camels. In the subsequent days the crowds in Tahrir Square reverted to using nonviolent methods.
6. Some civil resistance movements have sought, or welcomed, a measure of armed protection for their activities. Thus in the American civil rights movement of the 1960s, the Freedom Ride of May 1961, having been opposed violently, received armed protection for part of its hazardous journey; and the Selma to Montgomery March of March 1965 only succeeded in reaching Montgomery, Alabama, at the third attempt, when it was protected by troops and federal agents.
7. Some campaigns of civil resistance may depend up the existence of militarily defended space. A life-saving example of an effective civil resistance enabling threatened people to reach a defended space occurred with the Rescue of the Danish Jews in 1943 when thousands of Jews were spirited out of German-occupied Denmark and across a narrow stretch of sea (the Sound) to Sweden.
8. When leaders of even the most determinedly nonviolent movements have come to power in their countries, they have generally accepted the continued existence of armed forces and other more or less conventional security arrangements. For example, in 1991 Václav Havel who had been a leading figure in civil resistance in communist Czechoslovakia from the founding of Charter 77 to the Velvet Revolution of 1989, in his new capacity as President of the Czech and Slovak Federative Republic paid tribute to the NATO alliance. On 12 March 1999 the Czech Republic, along with Poland and Hungary, became a member of NATO.

== The term "civil resistance": merits and concerns ==
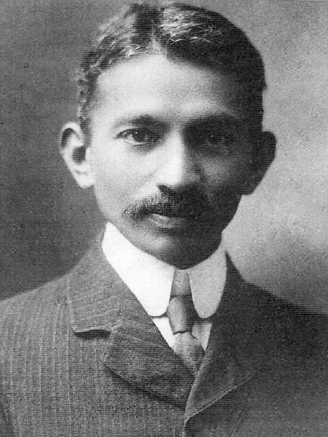
Gandhi in South Africa in about 1906–1909. Referring to his years there, he later wrote: "... I found that even civil disobedience failed to convey the full meaning of the struggle. I therefore adopted the phrase civil resistance."

The term is not new. Gandhi used it in many of his writings. In 1935 he wrote: "... I found that even civil disobedience failed to convey the full meaning of the struggle. I therefore adopted the phrase civil resistance." It is a near-synonym for nonviolent resistance, civil disobedience, people power and satyagraha. While each of these terms has its uses and connotations, "civil resistance" is one appropriate term to use in cases where the resistance has a civic quality, relating to a society as a whole; where the action involved is not necessarily disobedience, but instead involves supporting the norms of a society against usurpers; where the decision not to use violent methods is not based on a general philosophy of nonviolence, but on a wide range of prudential, ethical and legal considerations; and where the technical and communications infrastructure of modern civil societies provides a means of organizing resistance. Because of such considerations, the term has been used in this century in many analyses in academic journals.

What exactly are the advantages of the term "civil resistance", as distinct from its near-synonyms "nonviolent action" and "nonviolent resistance"? All these terms have merits, and refer to largely the same phenomena. Indeed, there is a long history, in many languages, of using a wide variety of terms to describe these phenomena. The term "civil resistance" has been used increasingly for two main reasons:

1. It emphasises the positive (civic goals; widespread civil society involvement; and civil as distinct from uncivil conduct) rather than the negative (avoidance of the use of violence).
2. It conveys, more effectively perhaps than such terms as "nonviolent resistance", that a movement's avoidance of violence in pursuit of a particular cause is not necessarily tied to a general belief in "nonviolence" in all circumstances, nor to a philosophy of "Gandhism", but rather arises from the particular values and circumstances of the society concerned.

There have been concerns that the term "civil resistance" might on occasion be misused, or at least stretched in a highly controversial way, to encompass acts of violence. Thus, arising from experience within the anti-globalization movement, one participant-observer has seen "new forms of civil resistance" as being associated with a problematic departure from a previously more widely shared commitment to maintaining nonviolent discipline. Because of these concerns, those who have used the term "civil resistance" have tended to emphasise its nonviolent character, and to use it in addition to – and not in substitution of – such terms as "nonviolent resistance".

== See also ==
- Arab Spring
- Boycott
- Civil disobedience
- Civilian-based defense
- Colour revolution
- Creative disruption
- Demonstration
- Dissolution of the Soviet Union
- Nonviolence
- Nonviolent resistance
- People power
- People Power Revolution
- Resistance movements
- Revolutions of 1989
- Right of revolution
- Social defence
- Tunisian revolution
- 2011 Egyptian Revolution
- 2016 Turkish coup d'état attempt
- Everyday Resistance

== Bibliography ==
- Civil resistance against climate change : What, when, who and how effective? / International Center on Nonviolent Conflict ICNC, Kelly Fielding, Robyn Gulliver, Winnifred Louis. - International Center on Nonviolent Conflict, 2021. ISBN 978-1-943271-63-4.
- Bartkowski, Maciej J. (ed.), Recovering Nonviolent History: Civil Resistance in Liberation Struggles, Lynne Rienner, Boulder, Colorado, 2013. ISBN 978-1-58826-895-2.
- Carter, April, Howard Clark and Michael Randle (eds.), A Guide to Civil Resistance: A Bibliography of People Power and Nonviolent Protest, vol. 1, Green Print/Merlin Press, London, 2013. ISBN 978-1-85425-108-4. See also vol. 2, Merlin Press, 2015. ISBN 978-1-85425-113-8.
- Chenoweth, Erica and Maria J. Stephan, Why Civil Resistance Works: The Strategic Logic of Nonviolent Conflict, Columbia University Press, New York, 2011. ISBN 978-0-231-15682-0 (hardback). In August 2012 this book won the Woodrow Wilson Foundation Award, given annually by the American Political Science Association for the best book on government, politics, or international affairs published in the US during the previous calendar year.
- Chenoweth, Erica. 2021. Civil Resistance: What Everyone Needs to Know. Oxford University Press.
- Clark, Howard, Civil Resistance in Kosovo, Pluto Press, London, 2000. ISBN 0-7453-1574-7 (hardback).
- Doudouet, Véronique, Civil Resistance and Conflict Transformation: Transitions from Armed to Nonviolent Struggle, Routledge, Abingdon, 2015. ISBN 978-1-138-12014-3 (paperback).
- Mallat, Chibli, Philosophy of Nonviolence: Revolution, Constitutionalism, and Justice beyond the Middle East, Oxford University Press, New York, 2015. ISBN 978-0-19-939420-3 (hardback).
- Nepstad, Sharon Erickson, Nonviolent Revolution: Civil Resistance in the Late 20th Century, Oxford University Press, New York, 2011. ISBN 978-0-19-977821-8.
- Randle, Michael, Civil Resistance, Fontana, London, 1994. ISBN 0-586-09291-9.
- Roberts, Adam, Civil Resistance in the East European and Soviet Revolutions (PDF available), Albert Einstein Institution, Cambridge, Mass., 1991. ISBN 1-880813-04-1.
- Roberts, Adam and Timothy Garton Ash (eds.), , Oxford University Press, Oxford, 2009. ISBN 978-0-19-955201-6 (hardback); ISBN 978-0-19-969145-6 (paperback, 2011). US edition. On Google. Reviews available at Oxford University Research Project on Civil Resistance and Power Politics.
- Roberts, Adam, Michael J. Willis, Rory McCarthy and Timothy Garton Ash (eds.), Civil Resistance in the Arab Spring: Triumphs and Disasters, Oxford University Press, Oxford, 2016. ISBN 978-0-19-874902-8. US edition. Arabic language edition published by All Prints Publishers, Beirut, 2017. ISBN 978-9953-88-970-2.
- Sharp, Gene, Sharp's Dictionary of Power and Struggle: Language of Civil Resistance in Conflicts, Oxford University Press, New York, 2011. ISBN 978-0-19-982989-7 (hardback); ISBN 978-0-19-982988-0 (paperback).
- Zunes, Stephen, Civil Resistance Against Coups: A Comparative and Historical Perspective, ICNC Monograph Series, Washington DC, 2017.

Other works related to the topic

- Ackerman, Peter and Jack DuVall, A Force More Powerful: A Century of Nonviolent Conflict, Palgrave, New York, 2000. ISBN 0-312-24050-3 (paperback).
- Ackerman, Peter and Christopher Kruegler, Strategic Nonviolent Conflict: The Dynamics of People Power in the Twentieth Century, Praeger, Westport, Connecticut, 1994. ISBN 0-275-93916-2 (paperback).
- Michael Beer, "Civil Resistance Tactics in the 21st Century". ICNC Press. ISBN 978-1-943271-40-5
- Carter, April, People Power and Political Change: Key Issues and Concepts, Routledge, London, 2012. ISBN 978-0-415-58049-6.
- Chakrabarty, Bidyut, ed., Nonviolence: Challenges and Prospects, Oxford University Press India, New Delhi, 2014. ISBN 978-0-19-809038-0.
- Davies, Thomas Richard, "The failure of strategic nonviolent action in Bahrain, Egypt, Libya and Syria: ‘political ju-jitsu’ in reverse", Global Change, Peace and Security, vol. 26, no. 3 (2014), pp. 299–313. ISSN 1478-1158.
- Gee, Tim, Counterpower: Making Change Happen, New Internationalist, Oxford, 2011. ISBN 978-1-78026-032-7.
- Howes, Dustin Ells, Freedom Without Violence: Resisting the Western Political Tradition, Oxford University Press, New York, 2016. ISBN 978-0-19-933699-9.
- King, Mary E., A Quiet Revolution: The First Palestinian Intifada and Nonviolent Resistance, Nation Books, New York, 2007. ISBN 1-56025-802-0.
- Nepstad, Sharon, Nonviolent Struggle: Theories, Strategies, and Dynamics, Oxford University Press, New York, 2015. ISBN 978-0-19-997604-1.
- Pearlman, Wendy, Violence, Nonviolence and the Palestinian National Movement, Cambridge University Press, Cambridge, 2011. ISBN 1-107-00702-X.
- Roberts, Adam, ed., The Strategy of Civilian Defence: Non-violent Resistance to Aggression, Faber, London, 1967. (Also published as Civilian Resistance as a National Defense, Stackpole Books, Harrisburg, USA, 1968; and, with a new Introduction on "Czechoslovakia and Civilian Defence", as Civilian Resistance as a National Defence, Penguin Books, Harmondsworth, UK, and Baltimore, US, 1969. ISBN 0-14-021080-6.)
- Schock, Kurt, Unarmed Insurrections: People Power Movements in Nondemocracies, University of Minnesota Press, Minneapolis, 2005. ISBN 978-0-8166-4193-2.
- Semelin, Jacques, Unarmed Against Hitler: Civilian Resistance in Europe, 1939–1943, Praeger, Westport, Connecticut, 1993. ISBN 0-275-93961-8.
- Semelin, Jacques, La Liberté au Bout des Ondes: Du Coup de Prague à la Chute du Mur de Berlin, Nouveau Monde, Paris, 2009. ISBN 978-2-84736-466-8.
- Semelin, Jacques, Face au Totalitarisme: La Résistance Civile, André Versaille, Brussels, 2011. ISBN 978-2-87495-127-5.
- Sharp, Gene, The Politics of Nonviolent Action, Porter Sargent, Boston, 1973. ISBN 0-87558-068-8. Also in a 3-volume edition. ISBN 0-87558-070-X.
- Sharp, Gene and others, Waging Nonviolent Struggle: 20th Century Practice and 21st Century Potential, Porter Sargent, Boston, 2005. ISBN 978-0-87558-161-3.
- Stephan, Maria J. (ed.), Civilian Jihad: Nonviolent Struggle, Democratization, and Governance in the Middle East, Palgrave Macmillan, New York, 2009. ISBN 978-0-230-62141-1 (paperback).
- Vinthagen, Stellan, A Theory of Nonviolent Action: How Civil Resistance Works, Zed Books, London, 2015. ISBN 978-1-78032-515-6 (paperback).
