= Mallat =

Mallat is a surname. Notable people with the surname include:

- Chibli Mallat (born 1960), Lebanese human rights lawyer
- Jean-Yves Mallat (born 1962), Lebanese sprinter
- Stéphane Mallat (born 1961), French mathematician
- Wajdi Mallat (1919–2010), Lebanese jurist, politician, and writer
