= People Power: the Game of Civil Resistance =

2010 video game

- Developers: York Zimmerman Inc.; Art & Logic Inc.
- Publisher: International Center on Nonviolent Conflict
- Producers: Miriam Zimmerman; Steve York; Hope Green
- Designers: Ivan Marovic; Chris Maka
- Programmers: Andrew Palumbo; Ron Turner; Ben Blechman; Tommy Morgan
- Artists: Daisey Traynham; Joe Watmough; Arturo Pulecio; Thomas Jung
- Composer: Andrew Sherbrooke
- Engine: Adobe AIR
- Platforms: Microsoft Windows; Mac OS X; Linux
- Release: 2010
- Genre: Turn-based strategy game
- Mode: Single-player

People Power: the Game of Civil Resistance is a single-player turn-based strategy game where the player leads a nonviolent movement. It is a direct follow-up to the 2006 video game A Force More Powerful, which likewise focused on civil resistance and nonviolent conflict and was produced by the filmmaker Steve York and the International Center on Nonviolent Conflict. The game was released in 2010 for Microsoft Windows, MacOS, and Linux via the Adobe AIR runtime environment.

== Gameplay ==
The tutorial scenario simulates a pro-environmental campaign. The game also comes with a scenario builder, a free app which allows the player to design original scenarios to play based on historical struggles, fictional situations, or present-day ongoing civil resistance struggles, anywhere in the world.

== Development ==
Ivan Marovic, one of the leaders of the Serbian student movement Otpor and later the executive director of the ICNC since 2022, was the core systems engineer for this game.

== Releases ==
The game has a file size of 44MB and is available only by download. The game runs on Adobe AIR which must be installed prior to installing the game. People Power was originally sold for $10 via its official game, with a standing offer to receive it for free for those who couldn't afford it. On October 15, 2015, the developers have released an updated version of the game, codenamed "v.f121" and now 105 MB large, free of charge. As of 10 February 2026, the game's official website has been displaying only configuration errors since September 2024.

== Reception ==
People Power: the Game of Civil Resistance falls under the category of serious games.
