= Power to the People =

Power to the People may refer to:

== Music ==
- Power to the People (Joe Henderson album)
- Power to the People (Poison album)
- Power to the People: The Hits, a 2010 compilation album by John Lennon
- "Power to the People" (song), 1971, by John Lennon
- Power to the People (box set), a 2025 box set by John Lennon and Yoko Ono
- "Power to the People" (Poison song)
- "Power to the People", a song by Public Enemy

== Politics ==
- Power to the people (slogan)
- Power to the People (Transnistria), in Moldova
- Power to the People (Russia), a defunct political party in Russia
- Power to the People (Italy), a political party in Italy

== Other uses ==
- Power to the People (book), 2007, by Laura Ingraham
- "Power to the People" (Yes, Prime Minister), a television episode
- Power to the People, a strength training method and philosophy introduced by Pavel Tsatsouline
- Power to the People, the weapons upgrade station in the Bioshock video game series
- The 2014 Winter Olympics opening ceremony in Sochi, whose alternative name is "Power to the People."

== See also ==
- All Power to the People (film), a 1997 documentary
- "(For God's Sake) Give More Power to the People", a 1971 song and album by The Chi-Lites
- People Power (disambiguation)
