= Joanne Leedom-Ackerman =

American novelist, short story writer and journalist

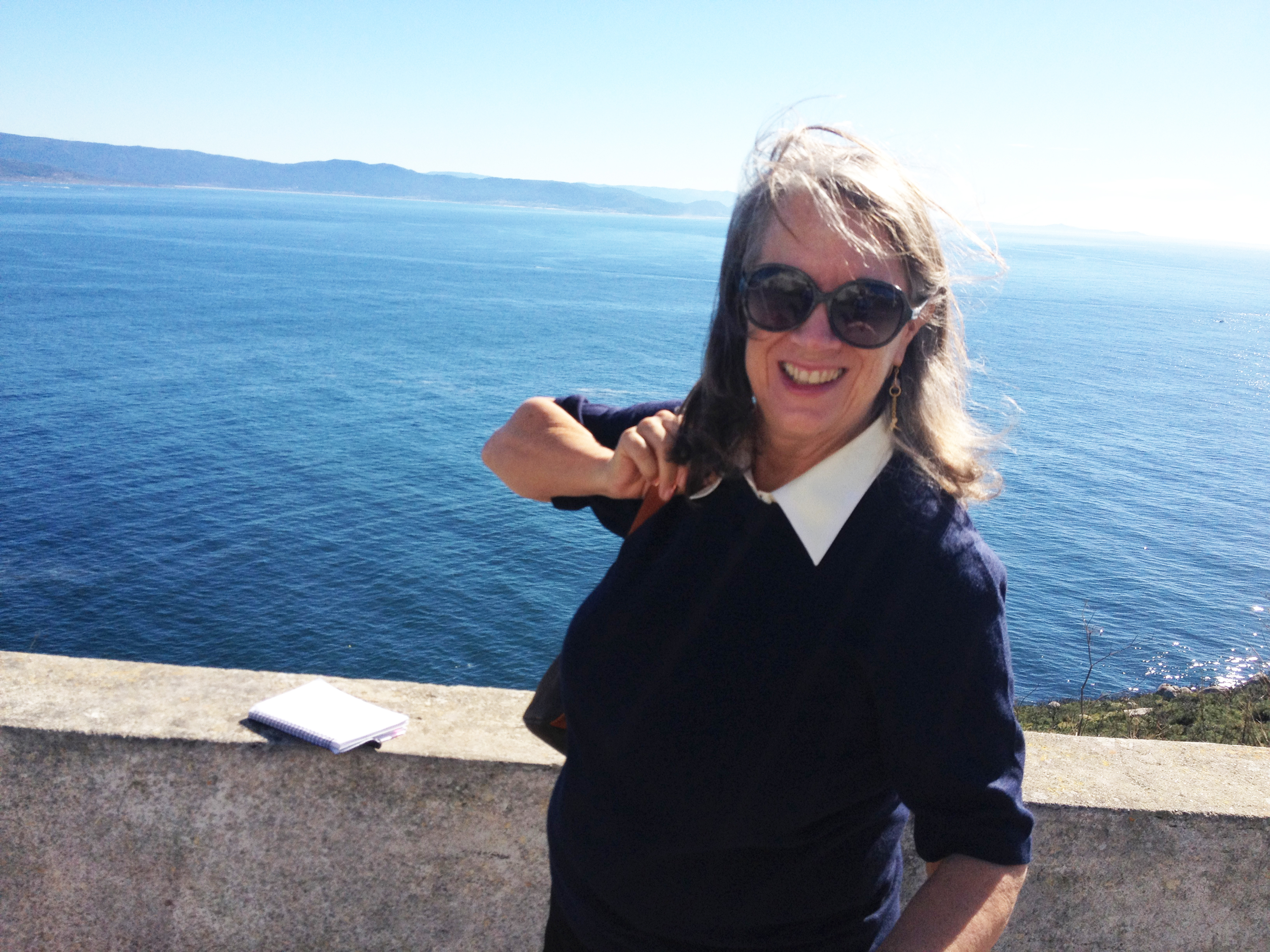
- Joanne Leedom-Ackerman
- Born: Dallas, Texas
- Education: Principia College
- Alma mater: Johns Hopkins University
- Occupations: Novelist; short story writer; journalist
- Spouse: Peter Ackerman
- Children: 2
- Relatives: Joanne Shriver Leedom and John Nesbitt Leedom
- Writing career
- Notable work: The Dark Path to the River
- Website: Official website

Joanne Leedom-Ackerman is an American novelist, short story writer and journalist whose fiction and literary non-fiction includes The Far Side of the Desert, Burning Distance, regional bestseller The Dark Path to the River, the short story collection No Marble Angels, and PEN Journeys: Memoir of Literature on the Line. She’s also the senior editor of The Journey of Liu Xiaobo: From Dark Horse to Nobel Laureate. She is a Vice President of PEN International and has served as the International Secretary of PEN International and Chair of PEN International's Writers in Prison Committee.

== Education ==
Joanne Leedom-Ackerman received a BA with honors from Principia College in 1968, an MA in creative writing from Johns Hopkins University in 1969, and an MA in English/creative writing from Brown University.

== Personal life ==
Joanne Leedom-Ackerman was born Joanne Leedom in Dallas, Texas, daughter of Joanne Shriver Leedom and John Nesbitt Leedom. Based in Fort Lauderdale, FL, Leedom-Ackerman was married to Dr. Peter Ackerman. Their sons are Dr. Nate Ackerman, a mathematician and former Olympic wrestler, and Elliot Ackerman, author and novelist and a decorated former US Marine captain.

== Career ==
Leedom-Ackerman's fiction and literary nonfiction work includes The Far Side of the Desert, Burning Distance, PEN Journeys: Memoir of Literature on the Line, The Dark Path to the River, No Marble Angels, and stories and essays in Short Stories of the Civil Rights Movement, Remembering Arthur Miller, Electric Grace, Snakes: An Anthology of Serpent Tales, Beyond Literacy, The Memorial Collection for Dr. Liu Xiaobo, Women For All Seasons, Fiction and Poetry by Texas Women, The Bicentennial Collection of Texas Short Stories, and What You Can Do. She is also the senior editor and contributor to The Journey of Liu Xiaobo: From Dark Horse to Nobel Laureate.

Both Leedom-Ackerman's fiction and her nonfiction focus on international affairs and conflicts.

A former reporter for The Christian Science Monitor, Leedom-Ackerman's career now includes work with organizations that serve writers and focus on issues of freedom of expression and human rights as well as on conflict resolution, education, development and refugee issues.

A Vice President of PEN International, she is the former International Secretary (2004-2007) and former Chair of their Writers in Prison Committee (1993-1997). Past president of PEN Center USA, she has served on the board and as Vice President of PEN American Center, and the PEN/Faulkner Foundation. She currently serves on the boards of the International Center for Journalists, Refugees International, American Writers Museum, and Words Without Borders and is a member of the advisory board of the Edward R. Murrow Center at The Fletcher School of Law and Diplomacy and the ICRW Leadership Council.

Her work with academic institutions includes service at Johns Hopkins University as a member of the Board of Trustees, as chair of its Academic Affairs Committee, as advisory editor of The Hopkins Review, and as chair of the advisory board of the Johns Hopkins University Press. She is a former member of Johns Hopkins School of Advanced International Studies (SAIS) Advisory Board. At Brown University, she served on the Board of Trustees and on the advisory board of the Brown Women Writers Project. She is an emeritus trustee of both universities.

Leedom-Ackerman is an emeritus Director of Human Rights Watch where she chaired the Asia Advisory Board. She has served on the Board of Trustees of Save the Children and on Save the Children's advisory board on Global Education. She has served on boards of the Albert Einstein Institution, the International Crisis Group, and Poets & Writers, and on the Advisory Boards of the Woodrow Wilson National Fellowship Foundation, the International Center for Research on Women and 100 Reporters.

She is a member of the Chairman's Advisory Council of the United States Institute of Peace, and she was an advisor for the Emmy-nominated PBS documentary A Force More Powerful: A Century of Nonviolent Conflict, which aired in two parts in September 2000.

She is a member of the Council on Foreign Relations, the Texas Institute of Letters, PEN America, English PEN, and the Authors Guild.

Leedom-Ackerman has also taught creative writing at Empire State College of State University of New York, Lehman College of City University of New York, New York University, Occidental College and The University of California at Los Angeles Extension.

== Selected bibliography ==
=== Books ===
- The Far Side of the Desert, Oceanview Publishing, 2024
- Burning Distance, Oceanview Publishing, 2023
- PEN Journeys: Memoir of Literature on the Line, Shearsman Books, 2022
- The Journey of Liu Xiaobo: From Dark Horse to Nobel Laureate, editor Joanne Leedom-Ackerman with Yu Zhang, Jie Li, and Tienchi Martin-Liao, Potomac Books, 2020
- The Dark Path to The River, Saybrook/Norton, 1988
- No Marble Angels, Saybrook/Norton, 1987

=== Short stories ===
- "Liu Xiaobo: On the Front Line of Ideas" in The Memorial Collection for Dr. Liu Xiaobo, edited by Chu Cai and Yu Zhang, Institute for China's Democratic Transition and Democratic China, 2017.
- "The Arc of My Mother’s Life" in Electric Grace: Still More Fiction by Washington Area Women, edited by Richard Peabody, Paycock Press, fall, 2007
- "The Beginning of Violence" in Short Stories of the Civil Rights Movement: An Anthology, edited by Margaret Earley Whitt, University of Georgia Press, 2006
- "Tutorica/The Tutor H.D.P.", Zabreb, 2006.
- "Remembering Arthur Miller", (essay) edited Christopher Bigsby, London: Methuen, 2005
- "The Child and the Snake" in Snakes: An Anthology of Serpent Tales, edited by Willee Lewis. New York: M. Evans, 2003
- "The Art of Writing Novels" in Beyond Literacy, edited by R. Patton Howell, Saybrook/Norton, 1989
- "The Tutor" in Fiction and Poetry by Texas Women, edited by Janice L. White, The Texas Center for Writers Press, 1975
- "Death Stalks A Building Once It Enters" in The Bicentennial Collection of Texas Short Stories, edited by James P. White, The Texas Center for Writers Press, 1974
- "Juror’s essay" in Women for all Seasons, Women's Building, 1988; edited by Joanne Leedom-Ackerman and Wanda Coleman.
- "Race Relations" in What You Can Do: Practical Suggestions For Action on Some Major Problems of the Seventies, David McKay & Co, 1971

Articles:

- “In Qatar, calls for release of prisoners come with the start of Ramadan,” GlobalPost, July 1, 2014
- “Tunisia could be the first Arab Spring success. But it's not there yet.” The Christian Science Monitor, May 27, 2014
- “The start of winter brings new dangers for Syrian refugees in Jordan,” GlobalPost, December 4, 2013
- “Qatar: A poet sits in a desert cell for reciting his work at home,” GlobalPost, November 1, 2013
- “Africa of the Mind: Friends Real and Imagined,” Africa.com, April 2, 2012
- “Worlds Apart,” The Christian Science Monitor, March 13, 2012
- “Mockingbirds at Fort McHenry: Tribute to Elliott Coleman,” The Fortnightly Review, June 23, 2011
- “Stranded in Casablanca, Out and About in Tangiers,” Africa.com, April 28, 2010
- “Yellow Geranium in a Tin Can,” From the November/December 2009 Issue of World Literature Today as the Introduction to the Special Feature, “Voices *Against the Darkness: Imprisoned Writers Who Could Not Be Silenced,” October 27, 2009
- “On its 60th anniversary, China is still crushing freedom,” The Christian Science Monitor, October 1, 2009
- “Turkey can avert a tragedy on the Tigris,” The Christian Science Monitor, August 26, 2009
- “Portal to Antiquity-Hasankeyf, Turkey,” World Literature Today, July–August 2009.
- “The intensifying battle over Internet freedom,” The Christian Science Monitor, February 24, 2009
- “The Role of PEN in the Contemporary World,” PEN International magazine, Vol. 56. No. 2, 2006
- “El Papel de PEN en el mundo contemoraneo,” Periplo, Mexico, June, 2007
- “Exorcising the Ghosts of a Nation,” The Los Angeles Times, (Sunday Opinion section), July 6, 2003
- “Iraq’s Future: Soccer Balls?” The Christian Science Monitor, June 23, 2003.
- “Status: The Kosovo Issue That Just Won’t Go Away,” The Los Angeles Times, (Sunday Opinion section) March 4, 2001.
- “New Hope in Turkey,” The Christian Science Monitor, November 18, 1999
- “Resurrecting Literature Online,” Brown University, October 26, 1999 (http://www.wwp-brown.edu/texts/forewordJLA.html)
- “Writers Behind Bars: PEN Writers in Prison” in AWP Chronicle (Associated Writing Programs) Vol. 30, No. 6, May/Summer 1998
- “Words: the Weapons of the Mind” in Kontakt Magazine (Denmark), Fall, 1996
