= People Power Party (disambiguation) =

The People Power Party is a political party in South Korea.

Other parties with the name include:

== Australia ==
- People Power (Australia) (2004–2006), a populist, progressive party
- People Power Victoria – No Smart Meters (de-registered 2017), anti-smart meters for utilities

== Hong Kong ==
- People Power (Hong Kong) (from 2011), a radical direct-democracy party
- People Power–League of Social Democrats (from 2016), an electoral alliance involving People Power

== Philippines ==
- People Power Coalition, an electoral alliance in 2001
- Several political parties and coalitions named "Lakas", Tagalog word for "power"
  - Lakas–CMD (1991), political party from 1991 to 2009, originally "Lakas ng Tao", Tagalog term for "people power"
  - Lakas–CMD, successor of the 1991 party founded in 2009
  - Lakas–Laban Coalition, electoral alliance in 1995
  - Lakas ng Bansa, Tagalog term for "Power of the Nation", political parry from 1986 to 1988
  - Lakas ng Bayan, Tagalog term for "People's Power", political party founded in 1978, transformed to an electoral alliance in 1987

== Elsewhere ==
- Lok Janshakti Party (India)
- Lok Satta Party (India)
- Jansatta Dal (Loktantrik) (lit. 'People Power Party (Democratic)')
- Bharatiya Janshakti Party (lit. 'Indian People Power Party')
- Desiya Makkal Sakthi Katchi (lit. 'National People Power Party') (India)
- Rashtriya Lok Janshakti Party (lit. 'National People Power Party') (India)

== See also ==
- People's Power Party (disambiguation)
- People Power (disambiguation)
- People's Power (disambiguation)
