= People's Power Party =

People's Power Party may refer to:

- People's Power Party (Malaysia)
- People's Power Party (Singapore)
- People's Power Party (Thailand)
- People's Power Party (Ukraine)

Also:

- Lakas ng Bayan (People's Power), (Philippines)
  - PDP–Laban (Partido Demokratiko Pilipino-Lakas ng Bayan) (Philippine Democratic Party–People's Power)
- Lok Janshakti Party (lit. ' "People's Power Party') (India)
- Lok Satta Party (India)
- Jansatta Dal (Loktantrik) (lit. 'People's Power Party (Democratic)')
- Bharatiya Janshakti Party (lit. 'Indian People's Power Party')
- Desiya Makkal Sakthi Katchi (lit. 'National People's Power Party') (India)
- People's Political Power Party of Canada
- People's Power Action Party (Solomon Islands)
- United Democratic Sabah People's Power Party (Malaysia)

== See also ==
- People's Power (disambiguation)
- People Power Party (disambiguation)
- People Power (disambiguation)
