= Jack DuVall =

Jack DuVall is an American activist, who has a background in universities, television, federal United States administration and politics, and the United States Air Force. He was Executive Producer of Steve York's 1999 film A Force More Powerful together with Dalton Delan, and developed it into a television series and a book. He is the founding director of the International Center on Nonviolent Conflict, together with founding chair Peter Ackerman.

== Education, business, political, military career ==
DuVall holds a B.A. degree (cum laude) from Colgate University. He spent 16 years as a television executive and author, he was Director of Corporate Relations at the University of Chicago, Director of Industry Compliance, Cost of Living Council, Executive Office of the President of the United States, and wrote speeches for candidates for the Presidency of the United States in four election campaigns. DuVall is an officer of the United States Air Force. In 2003, DuVall was a member of the board of directors of the Arlington Institute, a non-profit futures studies think tank founded by former naval officer and military expert John L. Petersen.

== Nonviolence activities ==
DuVall is best known for his role in media production and institutional actions related to strategic nonviolence used as a tool against governments perceived to be authoritarian. Together with Dalton Delan, Jack DuVall was one of the Executive Producers of Steve York's 1999 film A Force More Powerful about the theory and practice of nonviolence as a sociopolitical strategy, which was developed into a television series for the United States television network Public Broadcasting Service the following year, and then into a book that DuVall co-authored with Peter Ackerman. In 2001, together with Peter Ackerman, DuVall created a non-profit institute called the International Center on Nonviolent Conflict (ICNC). DuVall is founding director of the ICNC and Ackerman is its founding chairman. In 2007, DuVall was a facilitator at the Global Conference on the Prevention of Genocide, held in Montreal, Quebec, Canada.
