= Nate Ackerman =

American-British Olympic wrestler and mathematician

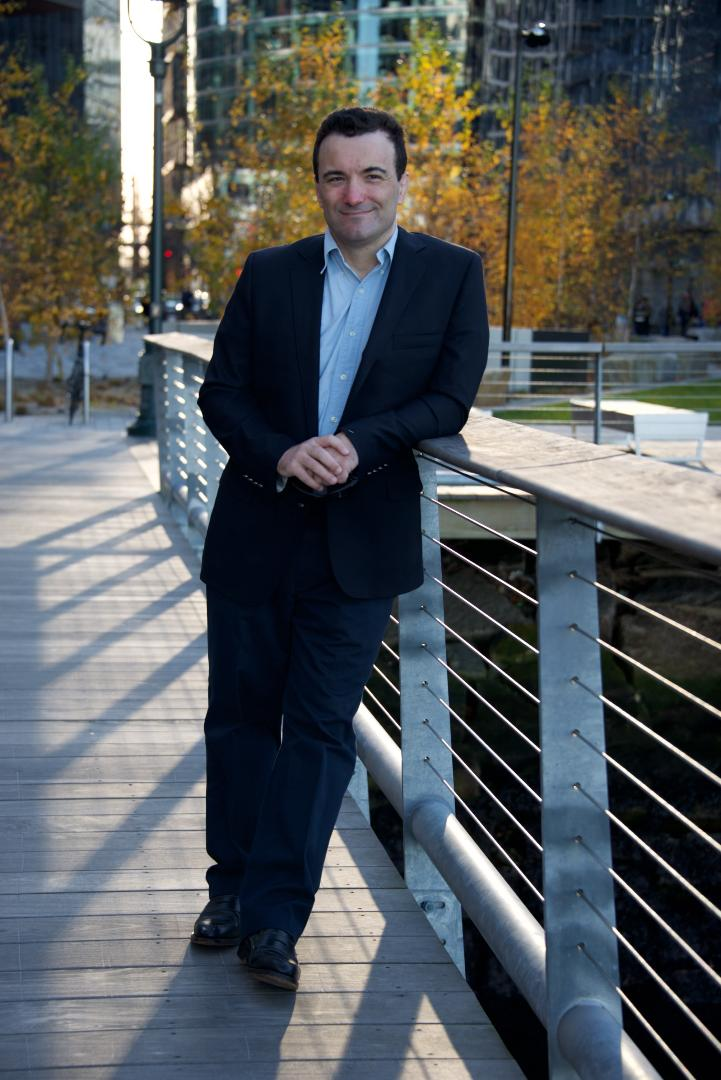
- Ackerman in 2024

Personal information
- Full name: Nathanael Leedom Ackerman
- Nationality: British/American
- Born: March 4, 1978 (age 48) New York, New York, U.S.
- Parent(s): Joanne Leedom-Ackerman and Peter Ackerman

Sport
- Sport: Wrestling
- Event: Freestyle
- Club: Dave Schultz Wrestling Club

Nathanael Leedom Ackerman (born March 4, 1978), known as Nate Ackerman, is a British-American mathematician and wrestler. He is the son of Peter Ackerman and Joanne Leedom-Ackerman.

== Biography ==
Ackerman was born in New York City, New York, United States to Joanne Leedom-Ackerman and Peter Ackerman. He was educated at the American School in London and then Harvard University, where he graduated in June 2000.

Ackerman competed in the 2004 Summer Olympic Games as part of the Great Britain National Team. He also competed in the 1999, 2001, 2002, 2003, 2005 and 2011 World Championships. Ackerman's best international finish was fifth at the 2011 Commonwealth Championship.

Ackerman was a two-times winner of the British Wrestling Championships at welterweight in 2002 and 2004.

He received his Ph.D. in mathematics in 2006 from Massachusetts Institute of Technology.
