= International Center on Nonviolent Conflict =

Non-profit institute involved with nonviolence strategy

The International Center on Nonviolent Conflict (ICNC) is a nonprofit educational foundation based in Washington, D.C.. The organization was founded by Jack DuVall and Peter Ackerman in 2002. It promotes the study and utilization of nonmilitary strategies by civilian-based movements to establish and defend human rights, social justice and democracy.

== History ==
ICNC was founded by Peter Ackerman and Jack DuVall in 2002. Jack DuVall served as ICNC's president and founding director, while Peter Ackerman served as ICNC's Founding Chair. In 2015, Hardy Merriman transitioned into the role of ICNC president, then Senior Advisor then Secretary of the Board.

DuVall is a writer and former public television executive. He was the executive producer of a television series, A Force More Powerful, on the PBS network. He is also a co-author of the companion book of the same name (Palgrave/St. Martin's Press 2001). The movie and book explore major 20th century nonviolent action campaigns and was nominated for and received numerous awards, including an Emmy nomination.

Peter Ackerman, who died in 2022, received a PhD from the Tufts University's Fletcher School for Law and Diplomacy in the 1970s, working under Gene Sharp, a widely respected academic and founder of nonviolent conflict as an academic field. Ackerman later became a venture capitalist and philanthrope. He was a highly-paid associate of Michael Milken at Drexel Burnham Lambert in the 1980s specializing in leveraged buyouts. During his academic career, Ackerman wrote a series of scholarly books on strategic nonviolent action. He also served on the board of Freedom House (including as chair between 2005 and 2009). He was a member of Council on Foreign Relations.

In raising public awareness of the history and ideas of nonviolent conflict in both democratic and autocratic societies, ICNC has disseminated books, articles, broadcast media, video programming, computer games and other learning materials. Staff members and associated scholars have led seminars in North America, Latin America, Europe, Asia, Africa and the Middle East for journalists, activists, educators and NGO leaders on the history and dynamics of strategic nonviolent action.

ICNC involvement in seminars and workshops involving activists in human rights, pro-democracy and social justice campaigns overseas have led to charges from some governments of foreign intervention, though ICNC policy prohibits its presenters from giving specific advice regarding any particular struggle. Such workshops, according to ICNC policy, come only in response to specific requests from activist groups themselves and are not initiated by ICNC. ICNC also maintains a strictly apolitical posture, in that it works with groups challenging autocratic governments regardless of a given regime's ideological orientation or relations with the United States.

Many ICNC staff went on to work for democracy-promotion establishments such as the United States Institute of Peace, a US nonpartisan, independent institute, founded by Congress and dedicated to a world without violent conflict.

ICNC has cooperated with other independent non-profit groups concerned with strategic nonviolent action, including the Albert Einstein Institution, Nonviolence International, and the Serbian-based Centre for Applied Nonviolent Action and Strategies (CANVAS). For several years, ICNC was funded exclusively through a private family endowment. However, in 2021, ICNC began fundraising from outside funders in view of a leadership transition. ICNC maintains a strict policy of not collaborating with any government or government-funded entities.

Hardy Merriman, who is Secretary of the ICNC Board, worked for the Albert Einstein Institution from 2002 to 2005. Peter Ackerman funded the Albert Einstein Institution from its founding in 1983 until 2002.

== ICNC Press ==
In 2015, ICNC launched its own press called ICNC Press and has since published over 40 titles in English, Spanish, Tibetan, French, Polish, Portuguese and many other languages. The titles include academic monographs, resources for practitioners, workbooks/guides, policy-relevant reports, as well as memoires, all focusing on different nonviolent movements or dynamics of nonviolent conflict. Since 2021, ICNC Press titles have been available in the form of e-books and have been cited as references in numerous academic and policy publications.

== Fostering a Fourth Democratic Wave project ==
ICNC and the Atlantic Council launched joint project Fostering a Fourth Democratic Wave to "catalyze support for nonviolent pro-democracy movements fighting against authoritarian rule." In March 2023, the project produced report Fostering a Fourth Democratic Wave: A Playbook for Countering the Authoritarian Threat, which draws on extensive research and discusses steps that democratic governments can take to support and enable pro-democracy, nonviolent civil resistance movements.

== Criticism of ICNC's educational work ==
Due to the political nature of many of the problems facing ordinary people worldwide—authoritarianism, social injustices, human rights violations, disregard for the climate, and more—ICNC has received criticism for its work to educate activists in nonviolent civil resistance. Criticism usually generates with traditional powerholders who are targets of mass nonviolent movements against authoritarianism, as well as members of their entrenched regime. One example is pro-Chavez American-Venezuelan lawyer Eva Golinger who alleged that during 2005 and 2006, ICNC trained Venezuelan youths to try to reverse the government of Hugo Chávez, through "[impeding] the electoral process and [creating] a scenario of fraud," claiming that ICNC did this together with USAID and NED as part of a systemic plan of implementing United States foreign policy aims in democratic countries. ICNC denies it ever engaged in such trainings, which are a violation of its charter. Jack Duvall has claimed that ICNC in 2007 supported the travel of two nonviolent activists to the World Social Forum in Caracas, at which they met with Chavez supporters to discuss methods of resisting any possible coup attempt.

== See also ==
- United States Institute of Peace
