= People's Power =

People's Power may refer to:

- Lakas ng Bayan (Power of the People), a political party in the Philippines
- Ganashakti (lit. 'People's Power'), a newspaper of the Communist Party of India (Marxist)
- Jansatta (lit. 'People's Power'), an Indian Hindi-language newspaper published by the Indian Express Group
- Janashakti (lit. 'People's Power'), a publication of the Communist Party of India
- Loksatta (lit. 'People's Power'), an Indian Marathi-language newspaper published by the Indian Express Group
- Lok Shakti (lit. 'People's Power'), a political party in India
- Prajasakti (lit. 'People's Power'), an Indian Telugu-language newspaper
- National Assembly of People's Power of Cuba, the Parliament of Cuba
- People's Power (Angola), a political faction within the communist MPLA in the 1970s
- People's Power (Bosnia and Herzegovina), a political party in Bosnia and Herzegovina
- People's Power (Colombia), a political party in Colombia
- Lok Satta Movement (India)

== See also ==
- People Power (disambiguation)
- People's Power Party (disambiguation)
- People Power Party (disambiguation)
