= Peter Ackerman =

American businessman (1946–2022)

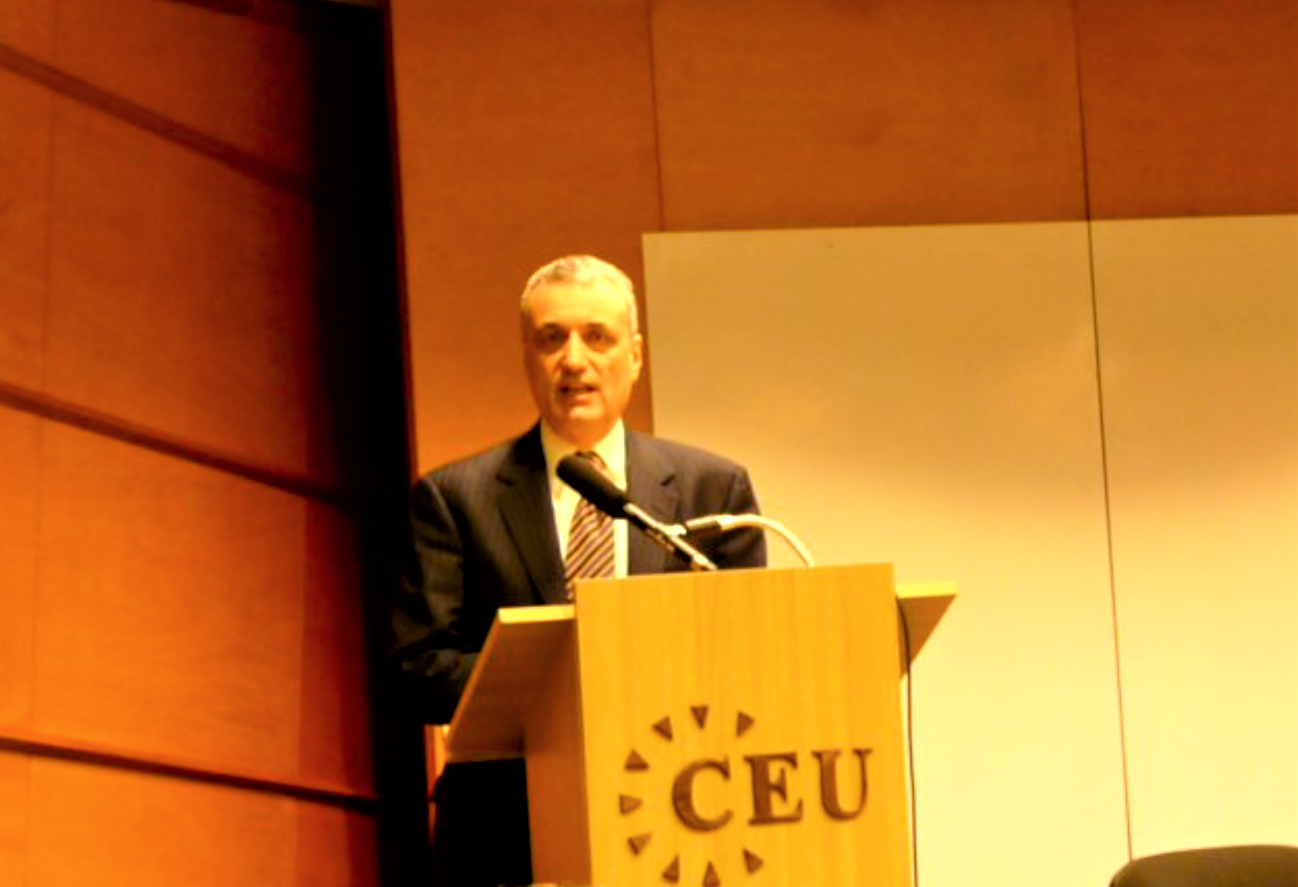
- Born: November 6, 1946; New York City, U.S.
- Died: April 26, 2022 (aged 75); Washington, D.C., U.S.
- Education: Colgate University (BA); Tufts University (MS, MALD, PhD)
- Occupation: Investor
- Years active: 1973-2022
- Employer: Rockport Capital
- Board member of: Council on Foreign Relations Atlantic Council
- Spouse: Joanne Leedom-Ackerman
- Children: Elliot Ackerman, Nate Ackerman

Peter Ackerman (November 6, 1946 – April 26, 2022) was an American businessman, the founder and former chairman of Americans Elect, and the founding chair of the International Center on Nonviolent Conflict. Ackerman was the managing director of Rockport Capital, Inc and served as a member of IREX's Global Advisory Council.

== Early life ==
Peter Ackerman was born in New York City, New York. He received his undergraduate degree in political science from Colgate University and was inducted into the Pi Sigma Alpha honor society. After graduating from Colgate, he attended the Fletcher School of Law and Diplomacy at Tufts University where he earned a Ph.D. in 1976 in International Relations. While at Tufts, he studied under Gene Sharp and Robert Pfaltzgraff. Ackerman's thesis, Strategic Aspects of Nonviolent Resistance Movements, examined the nonviolent strategy and tactics used by people who are living under oppression and have no viable military option to free themselves.

== Dispute resolution career ==
In 1983 Ackerman helped to fund the Albert Einstein Institution, founded by his former PhD supervisor Gene Sharp. AEI is a non-profit organization specializing in the study of the methods of nonviolent resistance in conflict (according to Bloomberg News, "advises pro-democracy activists on how to topple dictators via protests and mock elections").

In 1989 Ackerman consulted with student protesters from China following the 1989 Tiananmen Square protests and massacre. In 1990 he moved to London, where he was a visiting scholar at the International Institute for Strategic Studies. During this time he co-authored the book Strategic Nonviolent Conflict: The Dynamics of People Power in the Twentieth Century with Christopher Kruegler.

Ackerman was also a series editor and principal content advisor in the television version of Steve York's 1999 Emmy-nominated film A Force More Powerful: A Century of Nonviolent Conflict, which charts the history of civilian-based resistance in the 20th century. He co-authored with Jack DuVall a book of the same title. In 2002, Ackerman was the Executive Producer of the PBS documentary Bringing Down A Dictator, which chronicled the fall of Serbian leader Slobodan Milosevic by nonviolent means. The documentary, produced and directed by Steve York, received a 2003 Peabody Award and was the recipient of the 2002 ABC News VideoSource Award of the International Documentary Association. Eli J. Lake stated that Ackerman's book was one of the blueprints used by the Otpor movement that overthrew Miloslevic.

According to Bloomberg,

"In 2005, he co-wrote a study showing that non-violent action had been instrumental in 50 of 67 transitions to democracy since 1972, including in Chile, the Philippines and Poland. He has funded workshops for dissidents from Central Asia, Iran, Iraq and North Korea ... Ackerman also funded the Center for Applied Nonviolent Action and Strategies, which was started in 2003 by student leaders who'd helped bring down Serbian dictator Slobodan Milosevic three years earlier. Some members of Egypt's April 6 movement, which toppled President Hosni Mubarak, took civil resistance training from Canvas organizers in Belgrade."

Ackerman was a founding chair of the International Center on Nonviolent Conflict in 2002. Around 2004, Ackerman, until then one of the major donors of the Albert Einstein Institution, withdrew his funding, and Sharp was forced to run the organization out of his home in Boston.

In 2005 Ackerman became a director of the Institute for Strategic Studies' IISS-US office.

== Business career ==
In 1973, Ackerman joined the investment bank Drexel Burnham Lambert. From 1978 to 1990, Ackerman was Director of International Capital Markets Drexel until the company filed for bankruptcy. While at Drexel, Ackerman made more than $300 million working alongside 'Junk Bond King' Michael Milken, raising billions of dollars for junk-bond-fueled takeovers. In 1988 he received the second-highest take-home salary in Wall Street history, receiving $165 million. Criminal charges were never brought against Ackerman in Drexel's insider trading scandal. He publicly denounced the treatment of Milken and other leaders at Drexel by the firm once the government began to investigate them. Ackerman subsequently paid a $73 million settlement in a civil case brought against him by the Federal Deposit Insurance Corporation and the Resolution Trust Corporation.

After leaving Drexel, Ackerman founded several other companies, including Safari Acquisition. One of Safari's attempted acquisitions was its 1996 bid for control of Metro-Goldwyn-Mayer Inc. His main investment firms include Rockport Capital Inc. and Crown Capital. In 2002 Ackerman co-founded the online grocery service FreshDirect.

Ackerman was a member of the board of the Atlantic Council, and the Council on Foreign Relations. He was the chair emeritus of the board of advisors of The Fletcher School at Tufts University, his alma mater, and was the former chair of the board of trustees of Freedom House, serving there from September 2005 until January 2009.

== Political activities ==
In 2008, Ackerman sat on the board for Unity08, an organization intended to fund third-party candidates. In October 2012 Ackerman, along with New York City mayor Michael Bloomberg and Passport Capital founder John Burbank, funded the purchase of $1.75 million in independent political advertising, in the name of Ackerman's tax-exempt Americans Elect organization, to support the Senate campaign of Maine governor Angus King. Ackerman contributed the initial $5 million seed money to Americans Elect, a 2012 third-party Presidential nomination initiative, and served as chairman of its board of directors. Ackerman's son, Elliot, serves as Chief Operating Officer of Americans Elect. On May 17, 2012 Americans Elect, unable to mount a successful primary ballot, announced that "The primary process for the Americans Elect nomination has come to an end."

== Personal life ==
Ackerman was married to Joanne Leedom-Ackerman. They had two sons, Elliot Ackerman and Nate Ackerman.

Ackerman died on April 26, 2022 at the age of 75.
