= Power to the people (slogan) =

Political slogan or rallying cry

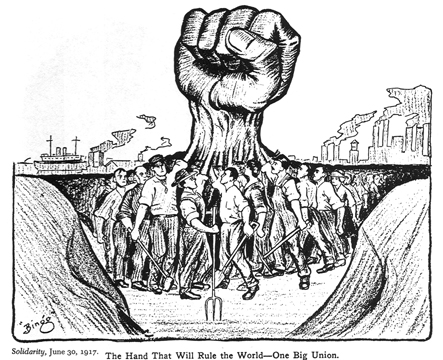
Cartoon of workers joining together with a metaphorical giant fist, from an IWW Journal

"Power to the people" is a cultural expression and political slogan that has been used in a wide variety of contexts.

== Uses ==
=== In politics ===
During the 1960s in the United States, young people began speaking and writing this phrase as a form of rebellion against what they perceived as oppression by the older generation, especially The Establishment. The Black Panthers used the slogan "All Power to the People" to protest what they perceived as the rich, ruling class domination of society. students used it to protest American involvement in the Vietnam War.

In his 1974 book Computer Lib, Ted Nelson connected computer use with political freedom with the rallying cry "Computer power to the people! Down with the cybercrud." In the mid-1980s the People Power movement arose in the Philippines to oust Ferdinand Marcos. In the late 20th century and early 21st century the phrase has been used with regard to energy policy.

The Pakistan Peoples Party has as its creed, "Islam is our faith; democracy is our politics; socialism is our economy; all power to the people."

During the Anti-Apartheid struggle in South Africa, the terms Amandla and Matla were used frequently during speeches and rallies; this was followed by the crowd responding with Awethu or Kee A Rona. These terms respectively mean "Power" and "To the people". These terms are still frequently used in ANC meetings and conferences as well as among student activist groups such as SASCO and the ANC Youth League.

Margaret Thatcher criticised the use of the slogan by the left in a 1986 speech: "Socialists cry 'Power to the people', and raise the clenched fist as they say it. We all know what they really mean - power over people, power to the State."

It is also the name of the left-wing to far-left Italian coalition Potere al Popolo.

=== In film and television ===
In the 2016 film Captain Fantastic, the phrase "Power to the people" (with the response "Stick it to the man!") is used at a pivotal point near the climax of the film.

The 1970s television series Citizen Smith had the title character use the slogan in the title sequence.

=== In music ===
"Power to the people" is the title of a 1971 song by John Lennon and a lyric by James Brown: "Power to the people, people power!" "Power to the people, 'cause the people want peace" is also chanted on the Public Enemy album New Whirl Odor. Rage Against the Machine quoted the slogan in their song "Year of tha Boomerang". The Jamaican reggae band Rootz Underground wrote a song entitled "Power to the People" in which they quote this slogan in both English and South African versions.

Saxophonist Joe Henderson released his album Power to the People in 1969.

One of the more politically extreme singer-songwriters is Quino, the lead singer of the reggae band Big Mountain who also wrote a song entitled "Power to the People" and then had a tattoo of "Power to the People" along with the fist placed on his chest.

The glam metal rock band Poison released a song titled Power to the People as a single on May 23, 2000. The song served as the lead single and title track for their fifth studio album Power to the People that was released on June 13, 2000, via the band's independent label, Cyanide Music. It marked the return of the band's original lineup, together for the first time since 1991's Swallow This Live with the return of C.C. DeVille who replaced Blues Saraceno.

The electronic house music artist Basement Jaxx released a song titled "Power to the People" on their album Junto in 2014.

== Variations of the slogan ==
A popular variation of the slogan is "Power to the Poor People!" Amongst others, the South African social movement the Western Cape Anti-Eviction Campaign uses the slogan to express the need for poor people to control their own movements rather than have wealthy donors or NGOs control or speak for them. The divide between South Africa's independent social movements and many leftist and vanguard organisations in South Africa has become a point of contention.

The South African slogan "Amandla Ngawethu" or "Amandla Awethu" is also a popular variation of the Power to the People. It means "The power is ours" but is used in a similar way as "Power to the People". It is often used in a call and response format, with the speaker shouting "Amandla" and the crowd replying "Awethu".

Another variation of the slogan was "Power to the People at Home," used for advertising purposes by Village Roadshow's home video division, Roadshow Entertainment in the mid-1990s.

The slogan of video game retailer GameStop, "Power to the Players", is a variation of the "Power to the People" slogan.

== See also ==
- People power
- Vox populi, vox dei
