= Wajdi Mallat =

Lebanese politician (1919–2010)

- وجدي ملاط
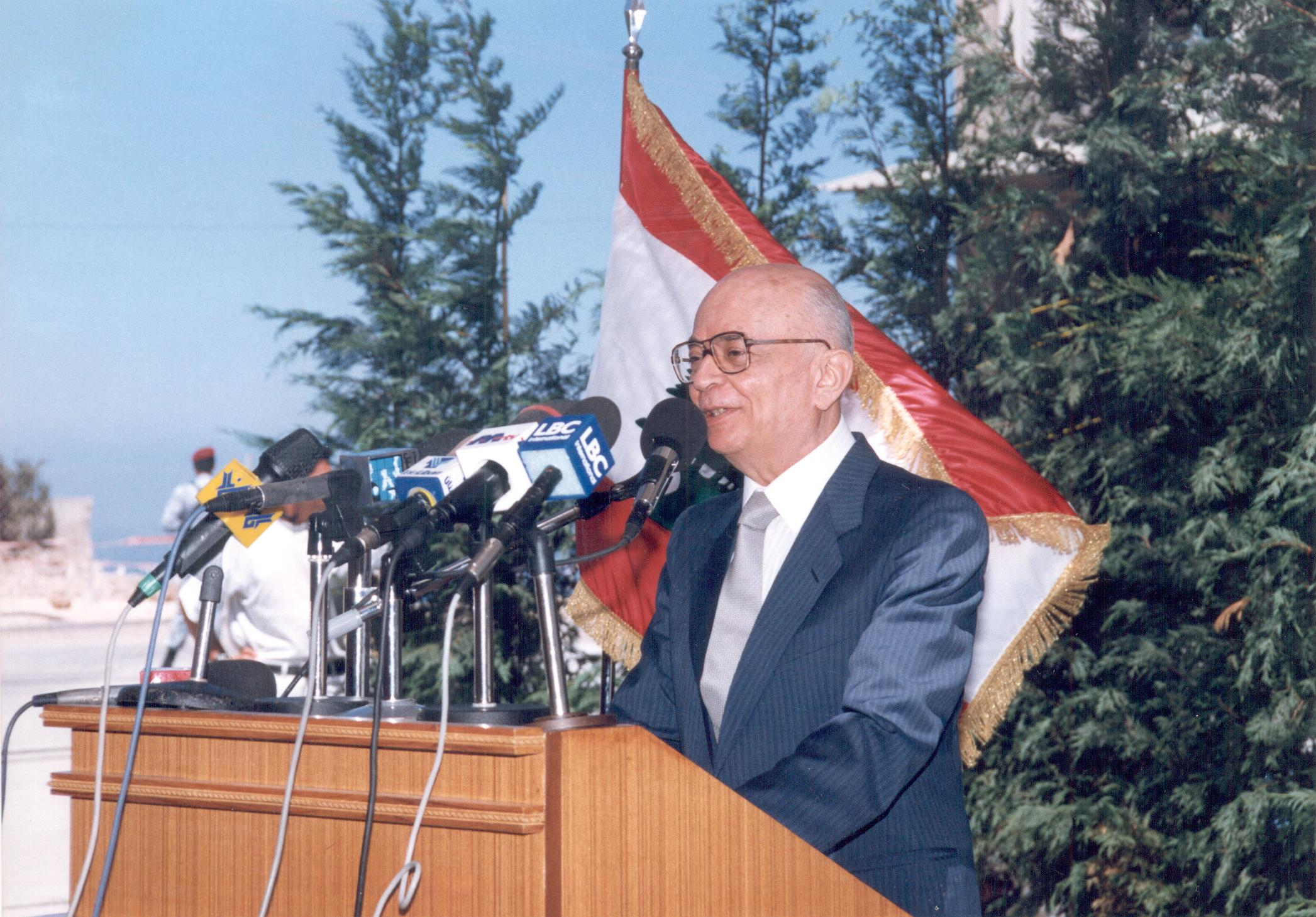

President of the Constitutional Council
- In office 1994 – April 3, 1997

Personal details
- Born: November 22, 1919
- Died: April 17, 2010 (90 years old)
- Children: Chibli Mallat
- Education: Saint Joseph University of Beirut

Wajdi Mallat (Arabic: وجدي ملاّط) (November 22, 1919 – April 17, 2010) was a Lebanese jurist, statesman and author. He was the first president of the Constitutional Council (Arabic المجلس الدستوري) of Lebanon, from 1994 to 1997. He resigned from the Council over the handling of the parliamentary elections of 1996.

== Early years ==
Born on November 22, 1919, Wajdi Mallat was the scion of a family of poets from the city of Baabda, the capital of Ottoman Mount Lebanon. His uncle Tamer (1856–1914), a judge during the Ottoman era, was a well-known poet who stood publicly against the arbitrariness and corruption of Wasa Basha (Arabic واصا باشا), the plenipotentiary governor of Mount Lebanon. His mother, Marie Checrallah, hailed from a family of physicians educated in Constantinople. His father, Shibli (1875–1961), was celebrated as the "Poet of the Cedars" (Arabic شاعر الأرز) in Cairo and Alexandria, Baghdad, Damascus, Aleppo and Haifa, and entertained close friendships across the region, from then Emir Abdallah of Transjordan (later King Abdullah I of Jordan) to the first president of independent Lebanon, Bechara El-Khoury.

== Education and early career ==
Wajdi Mallat was educated at the Jesuit college of Beirut, then studied for an advanced degree in Latin while earning a Masters in law from Saint Joseph University, where his classmates included many of the subsequent intellectual and political leaders of Lebanon. Among his professors was Choucri Cardahi. Wajdi Mallat was attached early on to the unique interwar experiment of liberalism in the Levant, especially Egypt, which he lived first hand from the close friendship between his father and the leader of the Egyptian national movement, Saad Zaghloul. As the young representative of the Lebanese delegation to UNESCO, which held an early Congress in Beirut in 1948, he made friends with intellectuals including Taha Hussein and Louis Massignon on his trip to Paris in preparation of the meeting.

== Lawyer and minister ==
Following a legal apprenticeship with prominent Lebanese lawyers Edmond Gaspard and Yusuf al-Sawda, he established Mallat law offices in 1949. As a lawyer, he defended celebrated cases in Lebanese modern advocacy, winning landmark judicial victories on behalf of the Vatican and the Beirut Maronite Church. In 1972, he was elected president of the Beirut bar, and founded the first Arab Organization for Human Rights in 1974, together with prominent Arab lawyers like Abderrahmane Youssoufi (Arabic عبد الرحمن اليوسفي), a prisoner of conscience and later prime minister of Morocco.

In peacetime, he was an influential figure in Lebanon through the respect expressed to him by the leaders of various factions and his intimate knowledge of the Lebanese political scene. In 1964, he was appointed Minister of Social Affairs by Lebanese president Charles Helou, but resigned a year later over the arbitrary dismissal of leading judges under the pretext of fighting corruption.

During the Lebanese civil war (1975–90), he refused to take sides, repeating his distaste for violence, while denouncing the atrocities carried out by various Lebanese factions and the excesses of foreign intervention. His mantra was taken through the long war from a saying attributed to Renaissance humanist thinker Erasmus, "to be Guelfe amongst the Gibelins, and Gibelins amongst the Guelfes", entrenched factions in Italy's 13th century civil wars. Amongst the Lebanese leadership, he maintained a close friendship with Raymond Eddé, Kamal Jumblatt, Musa al-Sadr and the successive heads of the Maronite Church.

The assassination of Kamal Jumblatt in 1977 came as a particular shock because of their literary and professional closeness and the particular affinity that had developed through a century and half of close family ties. In 2009, he published a diwan (poetry collection) of hitherto unknown poetry by his grand uncle Tamer, including poems to Nasib Jumblatt, a leader of the Lebanese Mountain in the second half of the 19th century.

He was also dismayed by the kidnapping in Libya soon afterwards of Imam Musa al-Sadr. He had achieved a historic compromise with Sadr, the head of the Lebanese Shi'i community, over a land dispute in Beirut, where the Imam Sadr Center now stands. His office later brought the case against Mu'ammar al-Qaddafi which led to an indictment and arrest warrant against the Libyan dictator and his aides.

He was a strong opponent of Israel's war on Lebanon in 1982 and provided the constitutional formula that put a definitive end to the attempted legitimization of the Israeli invasion known as "the May 17 Agreement". He was attached to the coming together of the Arab world in what he coined as "white Arabism", which he consistently opposed to the dark military and dictatorial regimes across the Arab world.

== President of the Constitutional Council ==
In 1994, he was elected by a large majority in the Lebanese Parliament to sit on the newly established Constitutional Council, then by his peers on the Council as its president. Within two years, the Constitutional Council had become the most respected institution in the country owing to its fiercely independent and principled decisions. He resigned from the Council over unfair tampering with parliamentary elections on April 3, 1997. While he never expressed the full reasons for his resignation to avoid further shocks to the country, he did say in a rare television interview that "the Constitutional Council came to Lebanon 25 years later before its time." His pattern of resigning high government positions earned him a reputation of a statesman who was keener to protect the public position's dignity over earning it in the first place.

== Retirement and legacy ==
He developed in his late years his rare literary talents into several books, including a best-selling book on his various political and professional positions entitled Mawaqef-Positions, in Arabic and French, and a reference compendium of some 700 pages on the mark of his father on contemporary Arab poetry, The Poet of the Cedars: a School for National Identity. He also left thousands of pages in legal studies and briefs, and a fully annotated manuscript of Tamer's recovered diwan.

He died in Beirut on 17 April 2010.

== Personal life ==
Dedicated to his family's education as his prime concern, he remained extremely private through his career as jurist, man of letters, and politician. During his tenure as the most powerful judge in the country, he refused all invitations to social functions. In 1956, he married Nouhad Diab. They had four children, Manal, Chibli, Raya and Janane, and seven grandchildren.

== Books ==
Shibli al-Mallat, Sha'er al-arz, madrasat al-talaqi al-watani (The Poet of the Cedars: a School for National Identity), Joseph Raidi Press, Beirut 1999, in Arabic, with introductions in English and French

Mawaqef-Positions, Dar al-Nahar, Beirut 2005, in Arabic and French

Edited, Tamer Mallat, Majmu'at qasa'ed wa ash'ar (Collection of lost poems), Beirut, private facsimile edition 2009, in Arabic.
