= People power =

Political term

Political term
- Goals: political change, democratisation

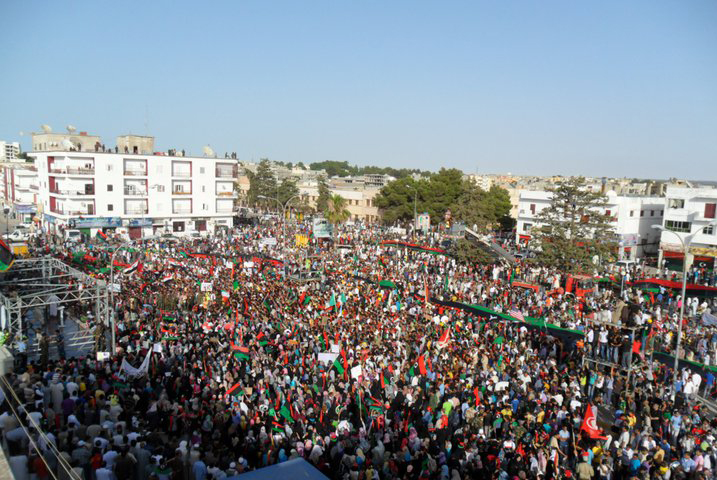
Mass protest in Libya, 2011.

"People power" is a political slogan denoting the populist driving force of any social movement which invokes the authority of grassroots opinion and willpower, usually in opposition to that of conventionally organised corporate or political forces. People power protest attempts to make changes in the political process of a given state - it refers to “revolutions driven by civil society mobilisation” which result in a reconfiguration of political power in a given state.

This method is reliant on popular participation “civilian-based” and therefore does not include isolated acts or protest without an overarching organisation by a group of people. People power can be manifested as a small-scale protest or campaign for neighborhood change; or as wide-ranging, revolutionary action involving national street demonstrations, work stoppages and general strikes intending to overthrow an existing government and/or political system. With regards to tactics employed by People Power movements, both nonviolence and violence have been used throughout history: as was the case in the non-violent 1986 People Power Revolution in the Philippines which overthrew the Marcos régime, or the violent uprising in Libya in 2011.

People power movements rely on popular participation and are therefore supported by civilians, as opposed to a governmental organisation or military wing. For this reason, academics and historians often consider the grassroots nature of people power movements, as they express the discontent of the governed.

== History ==
The earliest origins of people power protests are often identified as in “the third world, across at the second half of the twentieth century”. The socio-political and economic circumstances of this period popularised grassroots movements in the Third World. These circumstances include: a general trend in growing attention to human rights across the globe; advancements in communication technologies which allowed for dissemination of revolutionary ideas and organisational capabilities; minimal censorship of citizens by the government; among others. A specifically renowned instantiation of people power is the ‘flower power’ movement of the 1960s, which was organised in opposition to the Vietnam War.

== Goals ==
The general academic consensus is that people power movements are executed with the goal of changing the existing political structure in a given country, and in most cases, installing a democratic political system. As such, social movements or acts of protest which either have a goal unassociated with a political ideology, or incoherent movements with no end goal at all, are considered excluded from people power.

== Strategies ==
With regards to the numerous strategies carried out by people power activists, movements of this kind may involve violence and pacifism. Academic scholars recognise that because people power movements operate with the end goal of changing the existing political structure, if violence is to be used it will be “pragmatic or strategic” rather than principled non-violence. Pragmatic non-violence can include “non-physical pressures” or other measures to “undermine the opponents power”. As such, the category of people power cannot be applied to protests which are ends in themselves to exclusively promote a nonviolent philosophy. Rather, people power will use violent or nonviolent strategies — or both — to achieve desired outcomes with specific political goals. A case in point is the EDSA Revolution in the Philippines of 1986, which although was intended to be a peaceful revolution, actually adopted violent tactics. Historically, when compared to violent campaigns, more cases of non-violent people power movements have succeeded in achieving their political goals as they gain wider resonance with audiences outside the movement.

The level of organisation of people power movements varies from “relatively spontaneous…to pre-planned and highly coordinated”. There is not one specific method of planning or coordination necessary for a people power movement: so long as the tactics employed reflect a sustained effort from a “grassroots populace”. In terms of examples of different tactics employed, a wide range of strategies of protest and persuasion have been used. Strategies used by people power activists often engage the wider population so as to maximise participation and general engagement. Below is a list of strategies that would be exemplary of people power movements.

=== Small-scale ===
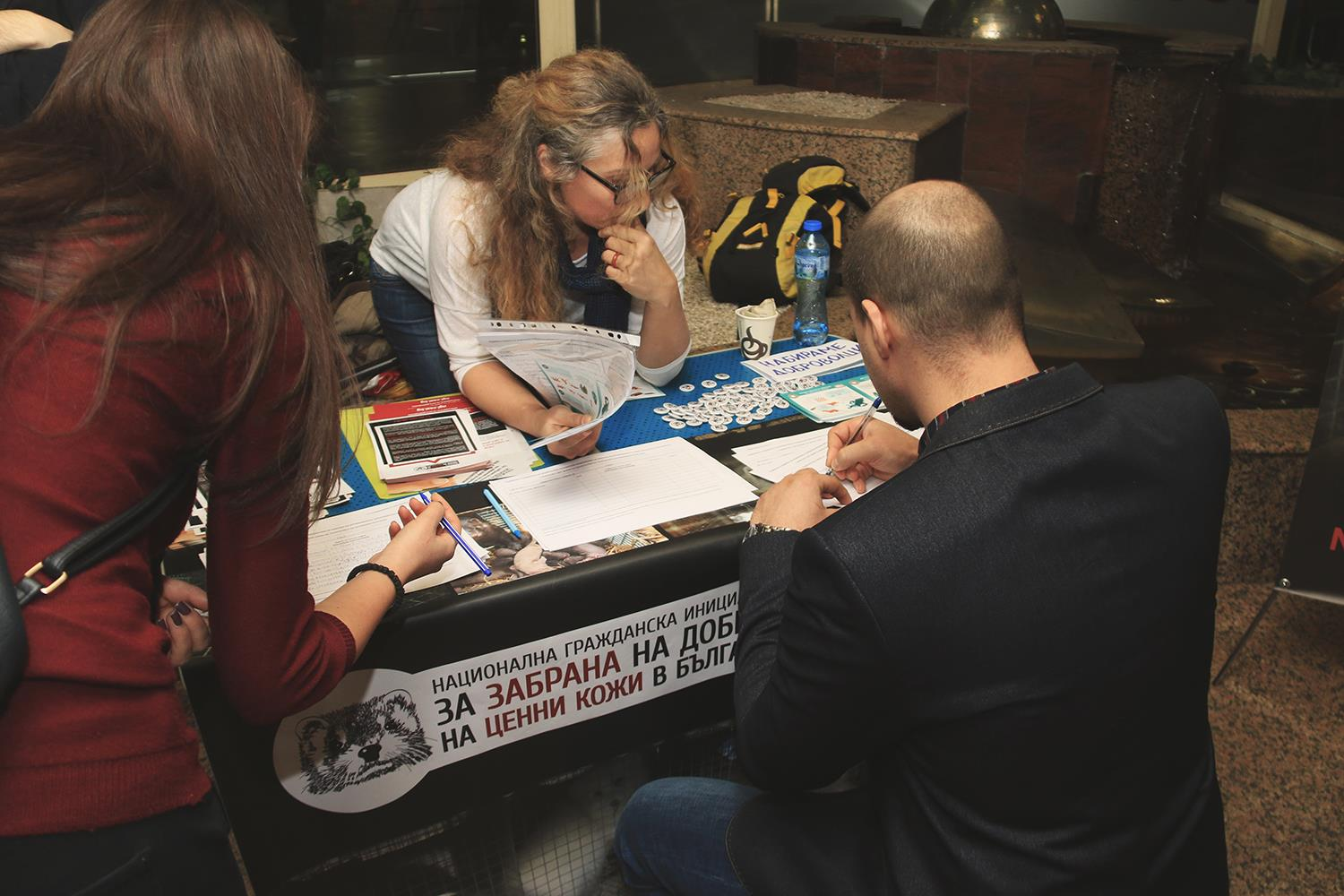
Collecting Signatures 2018

- Social media and network communications to share photos, images, and longer texts
- Signatures for petitions
- House meetings and events
- Posters, letter-writing, phone-calling
- Contact with media outlets or press
- Civil disobedience
- Fundraising and education campaigns
- Direct appeals through messages and emails
- Crowdsourcing campaigns to maximise participation in communities

=== Large-scale ===
- Organised “acts of sabotage” against government which anticipate armed and violent conflicts
- Nonviolent action and campaigns
- Violent street demonstrations and marches
- Blockades
- Work stoppages
- General strikes
- Legal action
- Boycotts, investments or disinvestments

April Carter, leading scholar on grassroots action and peace studies, identifies three advantages with the strategies of people power protests:

It reflects how those engaged in strikes, demonstrations and occupation of key buildings, and facing down armed security forces, see themselves: the people rising against oppressive rulers; it links the idea of resistance to the idea of democracy, which is the goal of the mass protests; it suggests the central strategy (conscious or intuitive) behind such peaceful revolts: that rulers can be toppled when the ruled refuse to obey them any longer.

== 20th-century examples ==
=== Philippines (1986) ===
Also known as the EDSA Revolution, this instance of people power was a series of nationwide demonstrations centred on Epifanio de los Santos Avenue in Manila between February 22 and 25 1986. Protesters expressed contempt toward the incumbent, authoritarian President Ferdinand Marcos after allegations of widespread corruption and persisting internal issues — including a prevalent economic disparity and a worsening recession. The EDSA Revolution had the ultimate goal of overthrowing the Marcos dictatorship and replacing it with a new political structure. Ultimately, it is regarded as successful for achieving that goals of the movement, as the regime fell and saw the Marcos family flee to exile in Hawaiʻi. In his place, the revolutionary government led by Corazon Aquino was installed, with Aquino succeeding as the eleventh President, and the subsequent promulgation of a new constitution.

=== Myanmar (1988-1990) ===
Also known as the 8888 Uprising, this movement aimed to overthrow the military and totalitarian regime of General Ne Win of the Burma Socialist Programme Party (BSPP). The Burmese movement had roots not only within the student, but also the religious populace: the campaign was led by students, monks and nuns. These activists were met with heavy government repression, in which there was over 3,000 casualties in demonstrations. Overall, Burma’s people power movement was unsuccessful as the campaign was suppressed by the military regime, without resulting in a democratic change to the political structure. Although the movement did encourage international action in the form of economic and diplomatic sanctions, the United Nations has made recent declarations that the country still suffers internal political corruption, reporting recent elections as fraudulent.

=== Eastern European satellite states (1980s-1990s) ===
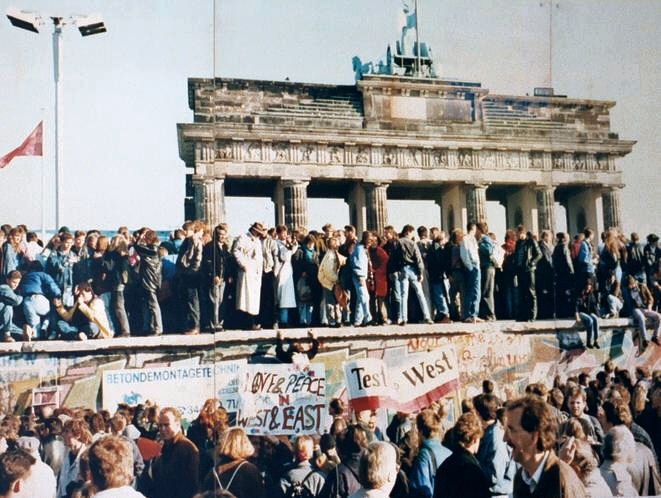
Berlin Wall Protests, 1989.

The dissolution of the Soviet Bloc during the end of the Cold War is also recognised as a people power as it was a culmination of growing disappointment with communist leadership in the USSR’s satellite states. Grassroots measures included, but is not limited to, the Solidarity movement in Poland and the Velvet Revolution in Czechoslovakia. These movements established the foundations for the Revolutions of 1989, which saw a wider change in the sociopolitical structure of Eastern Europe. The fall of the Berlin Wall in November successfully dismantled the Soviet Union and dissolved of the Soviet Bloc, subsequently allowing for the creation of individual, democratic state governments.

== Recent examples ==
=== Maldives (2004-2008) ===
Maldivian people power campaigns toward incumbent President Maumoon Abdul Gayoom of the Dhivehi Rayyithunge Party (DRP) took place between 2004 and 2008. Protests were direct at President Abdul Gayoom’s autocratic rule, which involved immense internal human rights abuses such as arbitrary arrests, torture, politically motivated killings. The movement was successful: Gayoom was voted out in the 2008 election. He reentered the political sphere in 2012 as people power opposition began to diminish. Therefore this movement is considered a failure in that it didn’t lead to a sustained change in the political structure of The Maldives.

=== Tunisia (2011) ===
The Tunisian Revolution catalysed when labour unions voiced dissatisfaction with internal economic issues, corruption, lack of political freedoms and poor living conditions brought on by the dictatorial rule of President Zine El Abidine Ben Ali. The people power movement started in 2010 when civilian Mohammed Bouazizi set himself on fire in response to being arrested and harassed by local authorities. This people power campaign was largely based on bottom-up protests such street demonstrations, and was organised on online media platforms such as Facebook and Twitter. The Tunisian Revolution is widely regarded as a successful people power campaign, as the dictatorial president fled the country on 14 January after widespread demonstrations. This contemporary example also served as a major inspiration for the Arab Spring revolution.

=== Libyan Civil War (2011) ===
Often regarded as a violent example of a people power movement, the Libyan Civil War took place between the 15th of February and 23 October in 2011. The goal of the movement was to overthrow Islamic modernist Muammar Gaddafi’s government, which was notorious for a systemic violation of human rights in Libya. This case of people power represents a relatively violent transfer of power — the International Criminal Court estimated that nearly 10,000 casualties occurred during this event. Rebel forces partook in street protests which contributed to massive general public damage, to which the Gaddafi government responded with the employment of warplanes, artillery, warplanes, and helicopter gunships. The movement ended when the National Transitional Council (NTC) was established as the legal representative of Libya and replaced the Gaddafi government, and the subsequent death of Muammar Gaddafi.

The extent to which the Libyan Civil War is considered a success is debated — although Gaddafi’s government was replaced, a second civil war was started in Libya after Gaddafi loyalists refused to cooperate with the new government.

=== 2020's ===
Gen Z protests in the 2020s are a series of youth-led, digitally coordinated movements worldwide, fueled primarily by frustration with corruption, economic precarity, and government failings. Enabled by social media, these often decentralized and leaderless protests have mobilized rapidly, challenging and, in some cases, toppling established political elites.

== People's war ==
People power is often associated with the people's war, which is a social movement with the more specific purpose of “confrontation until they have acquired the military strength to seize control of the state, or it disintegrates from within”. The main difference is that whereas people power seeks to dissolve autocratic and repressive regimes, people’s war refers to guerrilla conflict with ideological motives, such as an insurrection.

Below is a list of commonalities between the social movements of people power and people's war:

- winning majority support
- mobilising excluded sections of the population
- encouraging defection of troops and police
- building alternative institutions from below and
- promoting solidarity and fearlessness

== Criticism ==
The methodology of people power has been criticised from both academic and non-scholarly fields. Firstly, given the movement’s grassroots origins, people power has been criticised for excluding elite individuals such as academics from engaging in social movements. This consequently alienates individuals who potentially hold expert knowledge and experience from the organisation and execution of social movements. As a result, people power movements can reflect an “arrogance, or sheer inefficiency”.

Furthermore, people power methods are controversial in terms of their ability to sustain success. Historically, there is no guarantee that engaging in these movements will secure “permanent radical change”. This was the case of The Maldives which resulted in only a short term change to the political structure. Additionally, people power is controversial for producing unintended, or in some cases counterproductive, consequences in the political situation of a state. Military and autocratic governments “may be able mobilise their full forces of repression to quell for a time even the bravest resistance”, as seen in the example of Burma.

== See also ==
- Solidarity (Polish trade union)
- Revolutions of 1989
- Arab Spring
- Ohio Organizing Collaborative
- Passive resistance
- Civil Resistance
- Power to the people (slogan)
