= A Force More Powerful =

1999 film by Steve York

- Directed by: Steve York
- Written by: Steve York
- Produced by: Steve York; Dalton Delan, Jack DuVall
- Cinematography: Peter Pearce
- Edited by: Joseph Wiedenmayer
- Music by: John Keltonic
- Release date: 1999; 2000
- Running time: 110 minutes (1999 film) 154 minutes (2000 PBS series)
- Country: United States
- Language: English

A Force More Powerful is a 1999 feature-length documentary film and a 2000 PBS series written and directed by Steve York about nonviolent resistance movements around the world. Executive producers were Dalton Delan and Jack DuVall. Peter Ackerman was the series editor and principal content advisor.

Institutional support for the film included funding from the United States Institute of Peace and the Albert Einstein Institution.

The film played in festivals worldwide and was broadcast nationally on United States television network PBS in September 2000. It was nominated for an Emmy Award for Outstanding Historical Program.

The series explores six successful nonviolent movements in the 20th century, including Mohandas Gandhi's leadership of the Indian Independence movement, the Civil Rights Movement, the boycotts in the Eastern Cape Province as part of the Anti-Apartheid movement in South Africa, the Danish resistance to Nazi Occupation, the Polish Solidarity Movement, and the Chilean democracy movement to oust Augusto Pinochet.

A Force More Powerful is also the name of the companion book to the PBS series, authored by DuVall and Peter Ackerman,. In the Acknowledgments section of the book, the authors name Steve York as their most-cited source. The book was published with Palgrave Macmillan and has been recognized as an important resource for peace education.

== Video game ==
In March 2006, the team behind the film, TV series and book released a nonviolent video game developed by Breakaway Games with the same title. The serious game was designed to teach the waging of conflict using nonviolent methods. Ivan Marović, one of the leaders of the Serbian student movement called Otpor!, was one of the designers. A turn-based strategy game, it consists of ten pre-built scenarios and an editing system that will allow players to create scenarios of their own. The game's budget was $3 million.

Support for and sales of the game were discontinued on July 1, 2010, concurrent with the release of its follow-up game, People Power: the Game of Civil Resistance. The developers cited difficulty of maintaining backwards compatibility with newer operating systems and hardware as their reason for this decision.

== See also ==
- List of American films of 1999
- Civil rights movement in popular culture
- Erica Chenoweth
