= Chibli Mallat =

Lebanese lawyer and activist

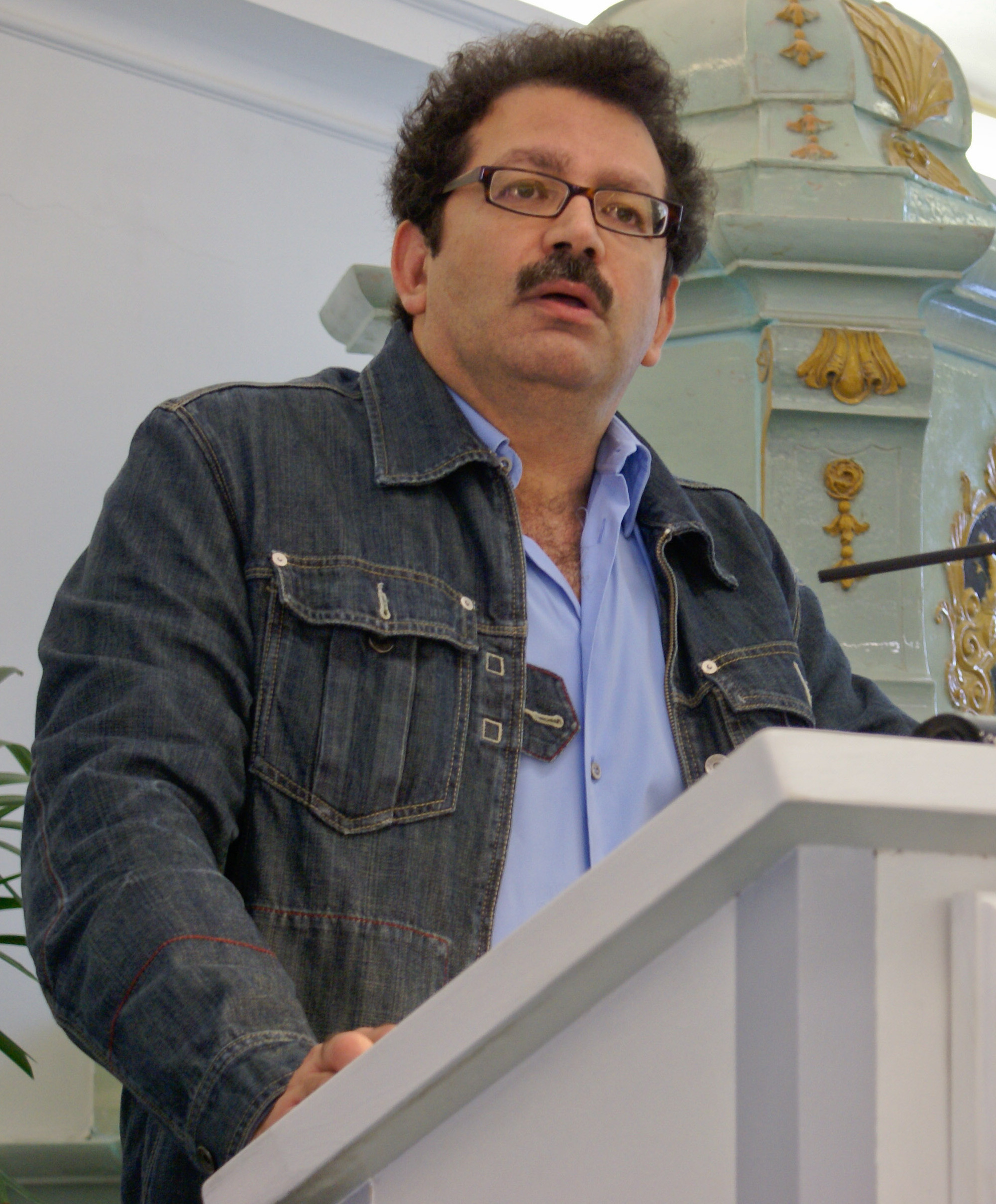
- Chibli Mallat during a speech at the Salzburg Seminar in September 2007
- Born: May 10, 1960 (age 66); Lebanon
- Citizenship: Lebanese
- Education: Saint Joseph University (LLL); Georgetown University (LLM); SOAS University of London (PhD)
- Known for: Human rights advocacy
- Parent(s): Nouhad Diab and Wajdi Mallat
- Website: www.mallat.com

Chibli Mallat (born May 10, 1960) is a Lebanese international lawyer, legal scholar, and a former candidate for presidency in Lebanon.

== Education ==
Educated in Lebanon, the United States and Europe, Mallat received his PhD from the law department of London University's School of Oriental and African Studies (SOAS) in 1990.

== University ==
"Chibli Mallat is a law professor who was tenured on three continents, in the US, as presidential professor at the University of Utah; in England at the University of London where he directed the Center of Islamic and Middle Eastern Law; and in Lebanon, at Saint Joseph’s University, his alma mater, where he was granted a Jean Monnet Chair of European Law by the European Union in 2001. The Chair was recognized as a ‘Center of Excellence’ by the European Commission in 2004, and Mallat as a ‘Success Story’ in 2007."

In 2006–2007, he spent one year at Princeton University where he was a visiting professor at the Woodrow Wilson School, Fellow in the Program in Law and Public Affairs, Fellow in the University Center for Human Values, Fellow in the Program in International and Regional Studies and a Distinguished Visitor in the Bobst Center for Peace and Justice.

Mallat was appointed in 2011 Custodian of the Two Holy Mosques Visiting professor of Islamic Legal Studies at Harvard Law School.

He taught in Fall 2012 at Yale Law School as visiting professor of Law and Oscar M. Ruebhausen Distinguished Senior Fellow.

In Spring 2015, he was a visiting professor at the Ecole des Hautes Etudes en Sciences Sociales (EHESS) in Paris. In 2023, he was invited as visiting senior fellow at the school of law of Sciences-Po in Paris to develop his work on comparative constitutional law.

He became Presidential Professor in 2009 at the University of Utah and is now an emeritus professor.

== Activism ==
Iraq has been a focus for him since 1982 as key to change in the Middle East, and he founded the International Committee for a Free Iraq (ICFI) in 1991 with Edward Mortimer and Ahmad Chalabi to seek the end of dictatorship in Baghdad. The ICFI brought together about a hundred Iraqi and international personalities, including leading US senators like Claiborne Pell, then chairman of the Senate Foreign Relations Committee, and John McCain, as well as British MP David Howell, then chairman of the Select Committee on Foreign Affairs, and respected Arab public figures like Saad Eddin Ibrahim and Adonis. Many of the committee's Iraqi members became the leaders of Iraq after the end of Baathist dictatorship in 2003, including Mohammed Bahr al-Uloum as the first president of the Iraqi Governing Council, Jalal Talibani as president and Hoshyar Zebari as Foreign Minister. Mallat was opposed to the US-led invasion, and sought with the support of then US Deputy Secretary of Defense Paul Wolfowitz an alternative Security Council Resolution that would have declared Saddam Hussein's presidency illegitimate and advocated the deployment of human rights monitors in Iraq during the transition to democracy.

In 1995, he initiated a campaign against Saddam Hussein with officials in Kuwait, London and Washington that developed into INDICT, a nongovernmental organisation he helped found in Britain in 1996. By 1998, INDICT had received open support in the American Congress and in the British Parliament, and was embraced by then US President Bill Clinton and British Prime Minister Tony Blair. The campaign laid the ground for a case against Saddam Hussein in Belgium in 2002, and his eventual trial in Iraq in 2005. A third case was won against Muammar Gaddafi in Beirut courts for the families of the historic leader of the Shi'i community Musa al-Sadr and his two companions, journalist Abbas Badreddin and cleric Muhammad Ya`qub, who disappeared in Libya upon their official invitation by Gaddafi in August 1978.

On 12 February 2003, he won a judgement in the case of Victims of Sabra and Shatila v. Ariel Sharon et al., under the law of universal jurisdiction in Belgium which resulted in Belgium removing the court's jurisdiction. He visited Iraq in late 2003 and again in early 2004 to accelerate the recognition of the Iraqi Governing Council as the official government of Iraq, a move opposed by Paul Bremer and Kofi Annan.

In 2016, he helped found Humanist Lebanon, organizing regular demonstrations in the centre of Beirut to end the presidential void in the name of the Constitution.

In 2019, he participated actively in the 17 October Revolution, praising the movement as "nonviolent and female-led".

== 2006 presidential campaign ==
In his native Lebanon, Mallat ran for president in 2005–2006 in an unprecedented challenge to the incumbent, Emile Lahoud, who had relied on the Damascus government of Bashar al-Assad to force an unconstitutional extension of his mandate. During the Cedar Revolution which was triggered by the assassination of the president's main opponent, Rafiq al-Hariri, Mallat was active in street protests and in the leadership, where his central advocacy was the establishment of an international, hybrid tribunal to arrest and try the assassins of Hariri and scores of other victims - eventually known as the Special Tribunal for Lebanon, and the removal of the 'coercively-extended president' from power.' Mallat's campaign was initiated in November 2005 to push a fractured and direction-less revolution towards its active materialisation in a presidency 'that looked like the people who made it.'

Denigrated by some as 'quixotic', the campaign was received in the local, regional and international media as a breakthrough for Arab democracy in its direct, people-based nonviolent challenge to dictators for life. Over a period of seven months, Mallat's team took its message to several cities and villages of Lebanon, and was supported by unprecedented mobilisation of the Lebanese diaspora, especially in the US. Internationally, the campaign culminated in a Security Council Presidential Statement that undermined the legitimacy of Emile Lahoud, and translated in a mass popular meeting on 14 March 2006 with a single motto: 'Lahoud must go'. As 'the primary architect' of Lahoud's demise, Mallat joined with the leadership of the March 14 coalition to develop his constitutional, nonviolent plan to replace Lahoud by a freely elected president. With the political deadlock that ensued, Mallat predicted a new bout of 'immense violence' descending on the country.

When the war against Israel was triggered by Hezbollah on 12 July 2006, Mallat was forced to interrupt his campaign on the ground. He accepted an offer by Princeton University and left for the US with his family. At Princeton, he completed six books, including two on the campaign.

In 2023, the Lebanese leader Walid Jumblat put his name repeatedly out for the presidency of Lebanon, arguing his appeal to the youth, his competence in law and economics, and his legal achievements. Mallat received two unsolicited votes in Parliament when the election was finally held on 9 January 2025.

== Writings ==
Mallat is the author or editor of some forty books, and has published dozens of scholarly articles and book chapters.

=== Collaborative work ===
Academic collaborative work has seen him serving as a joint founder and general editor of the Yearbook of Islamic and Middle Eastern Law, now at Brill, a series on 'Horizons Européens' for the Centre d'Etudes de l'Union Européenne at Saint Joseph University, and a series on Islamic and Middle Eastern Law at Kluwer Law International as director of the Center of Islamic and Middle Eastern Law at the School of Oriental and African Studies. He has also contributed several entries and chapters to specialised encyclopedias of Islamic and Middle Eastern Studies, and of comparative law. In 2014, he helped found and became the commissioning editor of Bada'e', a niche publishing house of books in Arabic, French and English on the Middle East.

=== Islamic and Middle Eastern law ===
In his work on Islamic and Middle Eastern law, he has engaged scholarship from the West and from the Middle East in a search for a common language of human rights and the rule of law to be conveyed from within the uniquely rich legal tradition of the Middle East from Hammurabi to the present. His first book, the Renewal of Islamic Law, which focused on the legal works of the most innovative Islamic scholar of the 20th century, the Iraqi Mohammad Baqir al-Sadr, received the North America Middle East Studies Association's annual prize, the Albert Hourani Book Award. Its Arabic version, published in 1998, circulated underground in Iraq until the demise of Saddam Hussein in 2003, and was reprinted several times since. The book was reviewed in over a hundred academic and press outlets, and revealed to the West a humanist scholarship at the highest intellectual level in Najaf. In 2009, he published Iraq- Guide to Law and Policy at Aspen/Kluwer Law International.

His Introduction to Middle Eastern Law, was published in 2007, and expanded the field of Islamic law to include the Middle East pre-Islamic legal tradition as an important component for legal research, and to prominently feature case law as a novel and essential focus to understand the law applied in everyday's life.

In 2023, he published an extensive treatise on Saudi Arabian Law at Oxford University Press, The Normalization of Saudi Law.

== Family and personal life ==
Mallat is the son of Nouhad Diab and Wajdi Mallat, the first president of the Lebanese Constitutional Council (Arabic المجلس الدستوري) of Lebanon.

He is married to Nayla Chalhoub, and they have two adult sons.
