= Steve York =

Steven H. York (born July 1, 1943-2021) was a documentary filmmaker and video game creator who has worked in Europe, Asia, Africa, and North and South America on subjects ranging from religious fundamentalism to American history to nonviolent conflict.

== Life and career ==
Originally from St. Louis, Missouri, York moved to Washington, D.C. in 1972, where he began editing and directing films for Bill Moyers and Charles Guggenheim. Since 1976, York has written, produced and directed films and television programs ranging from network series to prime-time specials, political campaign spots, advocacy and educational films.

His latest production, Orange Revolution, is a feature-length documentary about the stolen election in Ukraine in 2004 and the demonstrations that followed. It is currently airing on local public broadcast stations.

He has received two George Foster Peabody Awards: One for an ABC News Special, Pearl Harbor: Two Hours That Changed the World, anchored by David Brinkley, and another for his one-hour film about the nonviolent opposition movement which brought an end to the regime of Slobodan Milosevic, Bringing Down A Dictator, narrated by Martin Sheen, which aired on PBS in the spring of 2002.

In 1997 York began development on an in-depth examination of the history of nonviolent conflict. A Force More Powerful debuted as a feature-length documentary in the fall of 1999 and was expanded into a three-hour series for broadcast on national public television in the fall of 2000. York also produced A Force More Powerful: The Game of Nonviolent Conflict, a computer game that incorporates many of the themes of strategic nonviolent conflict explored in his recent films and People Power: The Game of Civil Resistance, which was released in the summer of 2010.

Other notable films and television programs by Steve York include Turning Point at Normandy: The Soldiers' Story (ABC News, with Peter Jennings); the Emmy-nominated Vietnam Memorial (PBS Frontline); Letter from Palestine, a first-person profile of a Palestinian medical team in the West Bank; and two films about the U.S. Supreme Court: a two-part PBS series, This Honorable Court, and The Supreme Court of the United States, a 30-minute film which ran continuously in the Court's Visitors' Center for over a decade.

Along with his partner Miriam Zimmerman, York runs his production company, York Zimmerman Inc., from Washington, D.C.

=== References ===
http://www.peabodyawards.com/award-profile/pearl-harbor-two-hours-that-changed-the-world http://www.peabodyawards.com/award-profile/bringing-down-a-dictator
