= Norton Dodge =

American economist

Norton Townshend Dodge (June 15, 1927 – November 5, 2011) was an American economist and educator who amassed one of the largest collections of Soviet-era art outside the Soviet Union.

== Education and teaching ==
Dodge was a native Oklahoman—named for his great-grandfather, Norton Strange Townshend—and a graduate of Deep Springs College. Dodge first traveled to the USSR in 1955, ostensibly to study tractors as part of his research for a PhD from Harvard University. He completed his doctorate in 1960, with the thesis Trends in Labor Productivity in the Soviet Tractor Industry: a Case Study in Industrial Development. Johns Hopkins University Press published his research on women's roles in the Soviet economy in 1966 as Women in the Soviet Economy : Their Role in Economic, Scientific, and Technical Development. Dodge was a professor of economics at the University of Maryland, College Park for over twenty years until 1980 when he took a post at St. Mary's College of Maryland in southern Maryland. He retired from St. Mary's in 1989.

== Art collection ==
It wouldn't be an exaggeration to say that Norton singlehandedly saved contemporary Russian art from total oblivion. This makes him an evangelical figure

— Viktor Tupitsyn

A Sovietologist who did pioneering work on the role of women under Joseph Stalin, at great risk to his own life, Dodge smuggled into the West the works of dissident artists, painters and sculptors in the former Soviet Union. He continued to acquire art and meet clandestinely with artists, often at great personal risk, till the death of dissident artist Evgeny Rukhin and the coming of perestroika. He managed to smuggle nearly 10,000 works of art from the USSR to the United States during the height of the Cold War. Dodge's role in the preservation and patronage of art disallowed by the government led to Elena Kornetchuk calling him "the Lorenzo de' Medici of Russian art." Dodge's work is detailed at length in John McPhee's The Ransom of Russian Art (1994).

Dodge appears in an Andrei Zagdansky documentary Vasya (2002) about a Russian Nonconformist artist Vasily Sitnikov. He is also featured in The Russian Concept: Reflections on Russian Non-Conformist Art (2009) by Igor Sopronenko.

The Norton and Nancy Dodge Collection of Soviet Nonconformist Art, which contains roughly 20,000 works of art, was donated to Rutgers University in the mid-1990s, where it is on permanent display at the university's Jane Voorhees Zimmerli Art Museum. The Dodge Collection includes work by Russian painter Irina Nakhova, who in 2015 was selected as the first female artist to represent Russia in a solo show in its pavilion at the Venice Biennale.

Dodge was one of the founding board members of the Kolodzei Art Foundation, a US-based group dedicated to advancing the study of Russian non-conformist art.

== Cremona Farm ==
Dodge purchased Cremona, a 750-acre former slave plantation in Mechanicsville, Maryland on the west bank of the Patuxent River, in 1966. Through 2011, he expanded the estate to 1,275 acres, including 40 buildings and structures, dating to the early 1800s. Archeological research has found evidence of colonial settlement on the site by the 1660s. The estate was placed under conservation easement with the Maryland Environmental Trust and transferred after Dodge's death to a non-profit foundation, the Cremona Foundation.

== See also ==
- Soviet Nonconformist Art
