= Anna Frants =

Russian-American painter

Anna A. Frants
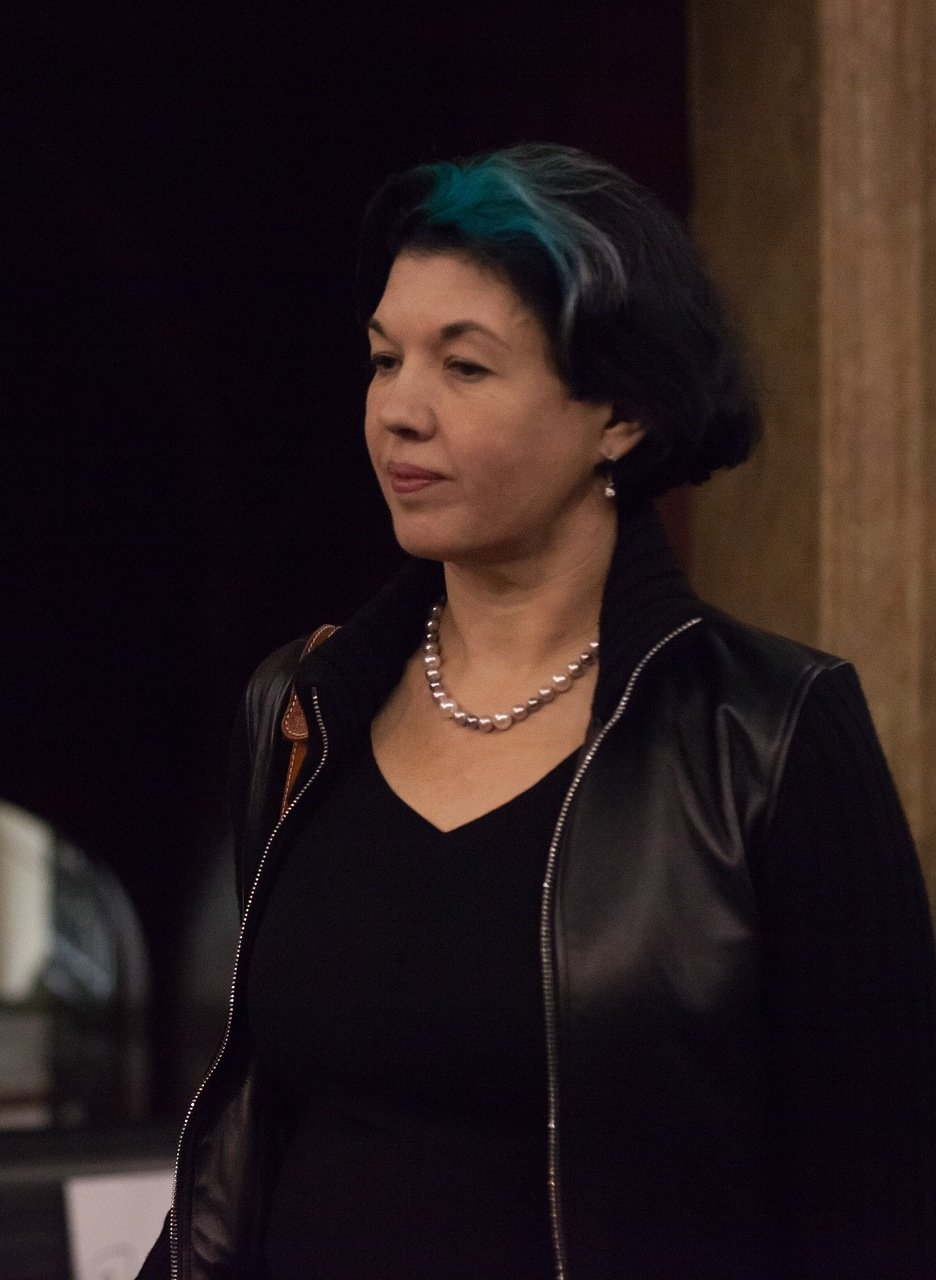
- Anna Frants
- Born: 1 October 1965
- Occupations: multimedia artist, curator, collector
- Father: Aleksandr Solomonovich Pinsker, political commentator (Voice of America)
- Awards: Autodesk Planet Studio Award, New York
- Website: https://annafrants.net

Anna Frants (Russian: А́нна Алекса́ндровна Фра́нц; born 1 October 1965) is a Russian-American multimedia artist, curator, and art collector. She is the founder of nonprofit cultural foundation "Cyland Foundation Inc." and "CYLAND" MediaArtLab, and is director of "Frants Gallery" (New York, United States).

== Biography ==
Frants was born on 1 October 1965 in Leningrad, Soviet Union. In 1989, Frants graduated from the St. Petersburg Stieglitz State Academy of Art and Design (formerly the Vera Mukhina Leningrad Higher School of Art and Industry), where she had majored in Industrial Design. In 1992, she was admitted to the New-York Pratt Institute to the department of Art and Design where she majored in Computer Graphics and Animation.

The mastering of computer graphics and animation marked the beginning of her enthusiasm for new media, new media art and technologies in art and the concentration of her interests on the transition from traditional classical methods to cyberarts that was afforded unlimited possibilities by the rapidly developing internet.

In 1997, she married Leonid Frants. Their son Daniil became the youngest artist at CYLAND MediaArtLab: when he was only twelve, he created, as part of Cyfest, an international educational game program for children, the workshop "Humanizing Robots", which he held in Russia, Germany, Japan, the United States and Ukraine.

In addition to continuous exhibition activities as an artist and a curator in the United States, Saint Petersburg, Europe and Japan, in 2010, Anna traveled to the Polar Region as a member of the international group of artists within the program "The Arctic Circle" organized by the Canadian government. The program's purpose was to afford the artists an opportunity to visit hard-to-reach places of the Polar Region that are mostly known through scientific reports, which would subsequently allow them to create art projects based on their impressions of the region. In addition to the video footage filmed by Anna, that trip resulted in her interactive project Trembling Creatures, exhibited at the group show of participants of those annual expeditions that opened in May 2014 at the "1285 Avenue of the Americas Art Gallery" in New York.

== Selected exhibitions ==
- Soft Screens, New York, USA, 2026
- CYFEST-17: Natura Naturans: Human Beings, Nature, Landscape, Venice, Italy, 2026
- CYFEST-17: Natura Naturans: Human Beings, Nature, Landscape, Thessaloniki, Greece, 2025–2026
- CYFEST: Midpoint, Yerevan, Armenia, 2025
- CYFEST-16: Archive of Feelings. A Journey, Mexico City, Mexico, 2025
- CYFEST-16: Archive of Feelings. A Journey, San Luis Potosí, Mexico, 2025
- Symbiosis: Art in the Age of AI, The Sylvia Wald and Po Kim Art Gallery, New York, USA, 2025
- CYLAND Art :: Tech on Armenia Engineering Week 2025, Engineering City, Yerevan, Armenia, 2025
- Subtropics 2025 Marathon Festival, Deering Estate, Miami, USA, 2025
- CYFEST-16: Archive of Feelings. A Journey, Yerevan, Armenia, 2024
- CYFEST-15: Vulnerability, Venice, Italy, 2024
- CYFEST-15: Vulnerability, New York, USA, 2024
- Science Week Armenia, Freedom Square, Yerevan, Armenia, 2024
- Armenia Engineering Week 2024, Engineering City, Yerevan, Armenia, 2024
- STAR's UP 2024 Festival: Space, Science, Astronomy, Aeronautics, Meudon, France, 2024
- PLANÈTE KOUAAN, Paris, France, 2024
- Anna Frants. BAKLUSHAS or Frittering Away Brahms, Alexander Gallery, Rose, Montenegro, 2024
- Time is Light, The Sylvia Wald and Po Kim Art Gallery, New York, USA, 2024
- Cyfest 15: Deering Estate, Miami, USA 2023
- Nomada Digital Arts. Flying Over Borders, Jerusalem, Israel, 2023
- XXII International Image Festival, XENOlandscapes, Bogotá–Manizales, Colombia, 2023
- Armenia Engineering Week 2023, Engineering City, Yerevan, Armenia, 2023.
- Digitec 2023, Meridian Expo Center, Yerevan, Armenia, 2023.
- CYFEST-14: Ferment, ASU MIX Center in Arizona, USA 2022
- Art & Environment=CROSSING Exhibition, Miro Center in Gwangju KR 2022
- Creative Machine 3 Exhibition, Goldsmiths College, London UK 2022
- Cyfest-14 FERMENT Arts + Ecology Festival, Dartington Trust, Dartington UK 2021
- ID. ART:TECH Exhibition at the National Arts Club, New York, US 2020
- Weather Forecast: Digital Cloudiness - Reggia di Caserta, Italy, 2018.
- Personal Spaces – Interactive Multimedia Works by Anna Frants, Carla Gannis, Alexandra Dementieva, Elena Gubanova and Ivan Govorkov. National Arts Club, 15 Gramercy Park South, New York, 2018.
- HYBRIS, Monsters and Hybrids in Contemporary Art, University Ca' Foscari, Venice, 2017.
- PERSONAL STRUCTURES - Open Borders. Venice, Italy, 2017
- Patterns of the Mind, Convergence, London, 2016.
- Nargifsus, Transfer Gallery, New York, 2016.
- Made in Ancient Greece, Sergey Kuryokhin Center for Contemporary Art, St. Petersburg, 2016.
- The Other Home, Made in NY Media Center by IFP, New York, 2015.
- Urbi et Orbi, as part of the 6th Moscow Biennale of Contemporary Art, RGGU, Moscow, 2015.
- Personal Space #1, Youth Center at the State Hermitage, St. Petersburg, 2015.
- Re: Collection, Museum of Arts and Design, New York, 2014.
- Magnetic North, The UBS Art Gallery, New York, 2014.
- Finding Freedom in Russian Art, 1961–2014, Paul & Lulu Hilliard University Art Museum, Lafayette, USA, 2014.
- This Leads to Fire, Neuberger Museum of Art, Purchase, New York, 2014.
- Capital of Nowhere, 2013.
- VISIONARY DREAMS # 3261-64", 2013.
- The Time Keeper, State Hermitage, 2013.
- Migrants, 5th Moscow Biennale of Contemporary Art, 2013.
- CYFEST Exhibition, 2012.
- The Time Keeper, Brussels, Belgium, 2012.
- Transmediale, ConcentArt e.V., Berlin, Germany, 2011.
- Trembling Creatures, SIGGRAPH ASIA, 2011, Hong Kong.
- Unforeseen, Nailya Alexander Gallery, New York City, USA

== Selected artworks ==
Frants's media installation Amabie combines an animated figure inspired by Japanese folklore with live webcam images from locations around the world. A version incorporating a neural network was exhibited in Symbiosis: Art in the Age of AI at the Sylvia Wald and Po Kim Gallery in New York in 2025.

- Different Robot — installation, 2025.
- To Make a Long Story Short — installation, 2024.
- Obstinacy and persistence, Installation, 2023.
- Vagaries of affection, multimedia installation, 2023.
- Unidentified objects, multimedia installation, 2021.
- BAKLUSHAS or Frittering Away Brahms, multimedia installation, 2021.
- Shedding crocodile's tears... or crying all the way to the bank, multimedia installation, 2021.
- Simple pleasures, installation, 2021.
- Amabie (Japanese averter), multimedia installation, 2020.
- Artist union. Still live, multimedia installation, 2019.
- Hooligans, media installation, 2019.
- Peck of salt, media installation, 2019.
- Point of no return, media installation, 2019.
- Dissident, media installation, 2018.
- Reflection in a space, media installation, 2018.
- Optimist, media installation, 2018.
- Narcissus, media installation, 2018.
- Washerwomen, media installation, 2018.
- Casts, media installation, 2018.
- Living tapestry, media installation, 2017.
- Blind spot, video installation, 2017.
- Possessive shoemaker, media installation, 2017.
- Stale news, media installation, 2017.
- Under the weather, media installation, 2017.
- Informer, media installation, 2017.
- No. 0, multimedia installation in public space, 2016.
- Bluest of the seas, media installation, 2016.
- Journey, media installation, 2015.
- Live cam renaissance, series of works, video Installations, 2015.
- Doll house, performance for children, 2015.
- Personal space, series of works, video Installations, 2015.
- Anxiety, installation, 2014.
- Weather forecast, multimedia installation, 2014.
- On the lookout, installation, 2014.
- Colouring soundscapes, sound installation, 2014.
- Reflection on life No.125082, installation, 2013.
- Weather Forecast – winter/summer, installation, 2013.
- Cloud that smelled blue, installation, 2012.
- Socks snapper, installation, 2012.
- Vexation of spirit, video, 2012.
- Storm in a tea glass, media installation, 2012.
- Shadows, interactive multimedia installation, 2012.
- Hoist, installation, 2012.
- Cardboard drippings, installation, 2012.
- Acrobats, installation, 2012.
- Gravitation, installation, 2011.
- Breathing in the air, installation, 2010.
- We are here, installation, 2010.
- Window sash, kinetic Installation, 2010.
- Snowball fight, video installation, 2010.
- Toddler, video installation, 2010.
- Trembling Creatures, installation, 2010.
- Polar Bear Fodder, multimedia installation, 2009.
- Infinity, installation, 2009.
- A Symphony for X Slide Projectors, multimedia installation, 2009.
- Fur die stadt (for the city), multimedia installation, 2008.
- Soda water, multimedia installation, 2008.
- Fish talk, cyber installation, 2007.
- Speedless, cyber performance, 2007.
- In the Shade of Olive Tree (in the collection of Kyosei-no-Sato Museum, Japan), video installation, 2007.
- Drumpainting, interactive artwork, 2007.
- StaticVideo series, video, 2006.
- Sarcophagus, Ghanaian Style, or The funeral of a Dreamer. Video installation, 2005.
- The story of heroic pilot, video, 2004.
- Made in Ancient Greece, series of works (5 objects from this series are in the collection of the Museum of Arts and Design in New York), 2003 - 2015.
- Touchmeweb, netart project, 2002.
- Bride. Audio, video, sensor performance, 2002.
- The angel, computer animation, 1995.

Trembling Creatures and Polar Bear Feeder were made as a result of the trip to the Polar circle as a member of the Canadian art expedition "The Arctic Circle" in 2009. Artworks by Anna Frants are presented by Borey Gallery (Saint Petersburg, Russia), Dam Stuhltrager Gallery (New York, United States, and Berlin, Germany) and Barbarian Gallery (Zürich, Switzerland). Her works are in the collections of the New York Museum of Arts and Design, State Russian Museum, Kyosei-no-Sato Museum (Japan), Kolodzei Art Foundation, Sergey Kuryokhin Center for Contemporary Art and in numerous private collections all over the world.

== Curatorial activities ==
The most notable of Frants' curatorial works were the retrospective exhibitions "Sterligov's Group", 2006, New York, and "Art around the Barracks", 2003, New York.

In the documentary of Andrey Zagdansky "Konstantin and Mouse", dedicated to Konstantin Kuzminsky, one of the episodes was filmed at the opening night of "Art around the Barracks" at Frants Gallery in Soho.

Among contemporary artists, who constantly collaborate with Anna Frants as a curator, are Vitaly Pushnitsky, Elena Gubanova and Ivan Govorkov, Alexander Kozhin, Alexander Terebenin, Marina Koldobskaya, Alexandra Dementieva, Peter Belyi, Petr Shvetsov.

Frants was among the curators of Natura Naturans: Human Beings, Nature, Landscape, presented as part of CYFEST 17 at the MOMus–Experimental Center for the Arts in Thessaloniki from 27 November 2025 to 25 January 2026.

== CYLAND MediaArtLab ==
In 2006, Anna Frants together with Marina Koldobskaya founded the international media lab "СYLAND".

Since 2007, CYLAND has organised CYFEST, an international media art festival held in different countries.

The use of computers allows the artist to break away from the deterministic nature of traditional art forms... Computer art is often similar to conceptual art from the point of view of intellectual judgment: the viewer needs to understand the artist's intentions. This understanding is even more important in interactive projects because the way we react depends on our ability to understand the artist's idea and expectations. The cyberart is challenging because it is based on the technologies and the means that are less intuitive for us and new in their form... Each innovative work gives us a new perspective for understanding the infinitely expanding universe of art and teaches us to understand its creative glossary.

—

== Nonprofit foundation "CYLAND Foundation" ==
In 1999, Anna and Leonid Frants created the nonprofit foundation "CYLAND Foundation" that is still active. Its purpose was the representation in New York of the artists from Leningrad/St. Petersburg who have been working there from the postwar 1950s until the present time. The primary focus was on the so-called Leningrad underground — the unique and underexplored cultural phenomenon of the 1970s and the artistic and social environment that brought if forth.

Gradually, the scope of activities of "Frants Gallery Space" expanded and started including not just the traditional genres, such as painting, sculpture and graphics, but also the art associated with the latest technologies: cyberart, video art, computer animation, interactive installations as well as performance art.

== Collection ==
The collection's creation was a natural extension of the development of "CYLAND Foundation". Since 1998, Anna and Leonid Frants have been collecting works of visual arts of Leningrad underground. Their current collection also includes sculptures, assemblages, photographs, videos, objects of actual art and archival materials.

In January 2013, the Department of Contemporary Art at the Hermitage Museum organized, as a part of the project "Actual Art of St. Petersburg, A Retrospective", the exhibition "Simple Rules". It showcased works from Russian and foreign private collections.

Works from the Frants Family Collection were exhibited alongside works from the Costakis Collection in Natura Naturans: Human Beings, Nature, Landscape at MOMus in Thessaloniki in 2025–2026.

== Selected publications ==
- Frants, Anna; Kolodzei, Natalia (2025). "Vulnerability in the Age of Media Art: CYFEST 15". Leonardo. 58 (5): 438–439. doi:10.1162/LEON.a.102.
- Frants, Anna (2025). "Time Is Always Now". Leonardo. 58 (5): 465–467. doi:10.1162/LEON.a.92.

Frants also contributed to Afterwards. Art in the Time of Change, edited by Valentino Catricalà and published by CURA. in 2025.

== Sources ==
- Technology of the Cyber-beauty — Anna Frants and Lena Sokol. NY Arts Magazine.
- Anna Frants // Venice Conference 2017.
- Is it All Quiet on the Cyber Front? — Anna Frants and Elena Sokol. NY Arts Magazine.
- People: Interview with curator Anna Frants at Venice Biennial 2015 // Chased. Magazin für Kunst, Ausstellungen, Vernissagen in Berlin. July 12. 2015.
- St. Petersburg holds the festival of contemporary art Cyfest for the third time — TV Channel 1, 2009.
- The Time Keeper. A traveling group exhibition — Digicult.// DIGICULT. Digital Art, Design and Culture. July 31, 2012.
- The Time Keeper — Be-In.
