= Orange Winter =

2007 feature-length documentary film

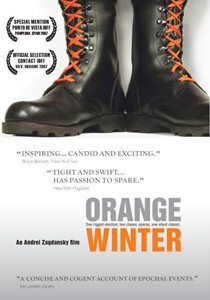
- Directed by: Andrei Zagdansky
- Release date: 2007
- Running time: 72 minutes
- Country: United States
- Languages: English, Ukrainian

Orange Winter (Ukrainian: «Помаранчева зима», romanized: Pomarancheva zyma, Russian: «Оранжевая зима», romanized: Oranzhevaya zima) is a 2007 feature documentary by an independent Ukrainian-American filmmaker Andrei Zagdansky. The documentary deals with the fraudulent presidential election in Ukraine in November 2004 and ensuing days of mass protest, known as the Orange Revolution.

== History ==
In the center of the film are not the political figures, but the "Maidan", literally "square" or "forum" in Ukrainian, the impromptu community of orange clad protesters. After two weeks of protests the Maidan forced authorities to cancel results of the rigged election and to set up a new election. The opposition candidate Victor Yushchenko won the run-off election and became the president of Ukraine.

Orange Winter is more than a mere history lesson. Like Norman Mailer's nonfiction novel The Armies of the Night ... this movie characterizes a body politic as a living thing, and charts its internal changes as if it were the protagonist in a drama.

— Matt Zoller Seitz, The New York Times

While the movie chronicles the first two crucial weeks of the political chaos and civil disobedience in the country, director intertwines scenes from the streets with two opera performances Boris Godunov and La traviata staged during the same time in the City Opera House.

Another cultural reference used in the film is Ukrainian silent classic Earth (1930) by Alexander Dovzhenko which is:

... invoked as a classic example of Ukrainian revolution ... this artistic juxtaposition lends its portrayed events an appropriately mythic tinge

— Rob Humanick, Slant magazine.

== Credits ==
- Directed and edited by Andrei Zagdansky
- Narration written by Alexander Genis
- Narrator Matthew Gurewitsch
- Original score by Alexander Goldstein
- Cameramen Vladimir Guevsky, Igor Ivanov, Pavel Kazantzev
- Produced by Andrei Zagdansky and Gleb Sinyavsky
- © 2006 AZ Films LLC.

== Awards ==
- Special Mention Award, "Punto de Vista" International Documentary Film Festival 2007, Pamplona, (Spain)
- Jury's Choice Award, First prize, the 27th Black Maria Film & Video Festival.

== Film Festival Screenings ==
- Artdocfest, Moscow, Russia, 2014
- DocuDays, Kyiv, Ukraine, 2014
- "Culture Unplugged" International Online Film Festival, 2013
- Istanbul International Film Festival, Turkey, 2012
- 27 Annual Black Maria Film + Video Festival, USA, 2008
- SF Doc Fest, San Francisco, USA, 2007
- "Contact" IDFF Kyiv, Ukraine, 2007
- Punto De Vista IDFF Of Navarra, Pamplona, Spain, 2007

== See also ==
- Orange Revolution (film)
