= Konstantin Kuzminsky =

Russian poet (1940–2015)

Konstantin Konstantinovich Kuzminsky (16 April 1940 – 2 May 2015) (Russian: Kонстантин Константинович Кузьминский) was a Russian performance poet.

Born in Leningrad, Kuzminsky emigrated from the Soviet Union in 1978. He published "The Blue Lagoon Anthology of Modern Russian Poetry". Other publications include a collection of Russian poetry "The Living Mirror". He appeared in several documentary films, among them two by Andrei Zagdansky: Vasya, a portrait of a close friend and Russian/Soviet nonconformist artist Vasily Sitnikov and Konstantin and Mouse (a.k.a. "Kostya and Mouse"), a double-portrait of Konstantin Kuzminsky and his wife Emma, nicknamed "Mouse".

Konstantin Kuzminsky died in the United States on 2 May 2015, aged 75.

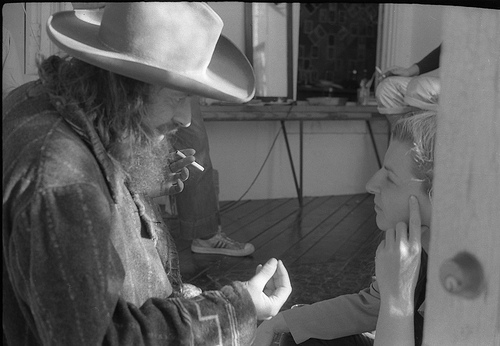
Kuzminsky and American performance poet Hedwig Gorski in Austin, Texas, 1979.

== Sources ==
The Blue Lagoon - Konstantin Kuzminsky and his Anthology of Modern Russian Poetry by Ilya Kukuj Academic Studies Press. Newtonville, Massachusetts: Oriental Research Partners; ISBN 9798887190167
