= Sitnikov =

Sitnikov is a surname. Notable people with the surname include:

- Alexei Sitnikov (born 1986), Russian figure skater
- Anatoly Sitnikov (1940–1986), Russian nuclear engineer
- Vasily Sitnikov (1915–1987), Russian painter
