= Bringing Down a Dictator =

2002 documentary film by Steve York

Bringing Down A Dictator is a 56-minute documentary film by Steve York about the nonviolent defeat of Serbian leader Slobodan Milosevic. It focuses on the contributions of the student-led Otpor! movement. The film originally aired on national PBS in March 2002. It was narrated by Martin Sheen and won the George Foster Peabody Award.

Other awards include:

- ABCNews VideoSource Award --- The International Documentary Association
- Silver Chris Award --- Columbus International Film and Video Festival
- Bronze Plaque: Scriptwriting --- Columbus International Film and Video Festival
- Silver Plaque --- The Chicago International Television Festival
- Gold Remi --- Worldfest Houston International Film Festival
- Best Documentary --- Sedona International Film Festival

== Screenings ==
- 2010 Zagreb International Film Festival
- 2010 Swarthmore College Peace Week
- 2008 Cairo Human Rights Film Festival
- 2007 Harvard University Program on Negotiation
- 2007 7islands Film Festival, India
- 2002 UCLA International Institute
- 2002 The Woodrow Wilson International Center for Scholars
- 2002 G6 Summit, Calgary, Canada
