= Interpretation of Dreams (film) =

- Directed by: Andrei Zagdansky
- Release date: 1990
- Country: USSR

Interpretation of Dreams (a.k.a. Tolkovanie snovideniy) is a 1990 feature documentary film by Andrei Zagdansky, produced in the Soviet Union during the perestroika period.

Using extensive quotes from several Freudian works still banned by the Soviet censorship at the time (The Interpretation of Dreams, Totem and Taboo, Civilization and Its Discontents) the documentary interprets the pivotal points of European history of the past century – the rise of Nazism and Communism - from a psychoanalytical point of view.

== Plot ==
The plot of the film is based on a journey through time and archival newsreels. The journey through the film archives begins with the first footage shot by the Lumière brothers, the "arrival of the train" in 1896 (the year of publication of Freud's seminal work of the same name, The Interpretation of Dreams) until 1939 (the beginning of World War II and the death of the founder of psychoanalysis). This journey is commented on by an imaginary dialog between the author of the film and Sigmund Freud.

== Reception ==
Interpretation of Dreams received a Grand Prix of the All-Union Documentary Film Festival and was successfully screened at a number of international film festivals - IDFA in Amsterdam, New Directors/New Films Festival and Glasnost Series for the Lincoln center in NYC, Flaherty Film Seminars, San Francisco Jewish Film Festival, Kraków International Film Festival, London Jewish Film Festival, Boston Jewish Film Festival, etc.

Vincent Canby wrote in The New York Times:

... an entire country is put on the couch to be analyzed by the film maker using Sigmund Freud as his guide.

Mr. Zagdansky juxtaposes quotes from Freud, which are read on the soundtrack, and the history of the Soviet Union as captured in vintage newsreels and other old films. The tone is that of an enlightened skeptic; the manner witty. The film attempts to come to terms with a time that now seems to have been seriously neurotic, if not worse.
