= Vasya (film) =

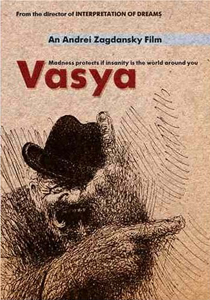
- Directed by: Andrei Zagdansky
- Written by: Andrei Zagdansky
- Produced by: Andrei Zagdansky (Producer); Andrei Razumovsky (co-producer)
- Cinematography: Yevgeni Smirnov
- Edited by: Andrei Zagdansky
- Distributed by: Facets Multimedia Inc.
- Release date: 2002
- Running time: 60 minutes
- Country: United States
- Languages: Russian; English

Vasya is a 2002 American documentary film written, directed and produced by Andrei Zagdansky. The film tells the story of Russian underground artist Vasily Sitnikov, who was declared insane in early 1940s by the Soviet authorities. A man without a passport, in and out of mental asylums, he was the key and often "larger than life" figure of the nonconformist art movement in the Soviet Union. The movie portrays the struggles of the painter as he meets an American man that wants to buy his work. In 1975 fearing prosecution and another involuntary commitment to a mental asylum he immigrated to Austria and then to the United States. He died virtually unknown in 1987 in NYC.

A number of prominent artists appear in the film, such as Dmitri Plavinsky Vladimir Titov, Kevin Clarke, poet and publisher Konstantyn K. Kuzminsky and art collector Norton Dodge, who has amassed one of the largest collections of Soviet-era art outside the Soviet Union.

== Additional Credits ==
- Animation by Signe Baumane
- Original score by Alexander Goldstein
- AZ Films L.L.S. and Fora Film
- © 2002 AZ Films L.L.C.
