= My Father Evgeni =

2010 documentary film

- Directed by: Andrei Zagdansky
- Written by: Andrei Zagdansky
- Produced by: Andrei Zagdansky; Gleb Sinyavsky
- Narrated by: Andrei Zagdansky, Alexander Gelman
- Cinematography: Vladimir Guyevsky
- Edited by: Andrei Zagdansky
- Production company: AZ Films LLC
- Release date: November 23, 2010 (IDFA Festival)
- Running time: 77 minutes
- Countries: United States; Ukraine
- Languages: Russian, English

My Father Evgeni (Ukrainian: «Мій батько Євген», romanized: Miy batko Ievhen) is a 2010 American documentary film written, directed and produced by Andrei Zagdansky. The film tells the story of Evgeni Zagdansky, a World War II veteran, who became a filmmaker and head of the Soviet state film studio Kyivnaukfilm in Kyiv, Soviet Ukraine.

== Festivals and awards ==
- New York Jewish Film Festival, New York, 2012
- New York Documentary Film Festival, DOC NYC, New York, 2011
- Jewish Eye International Film Festival, Ashkelon, Israel, 2011
- 1001 Documentary International Film Festival - Istanbul, Turkey, 2011
- Krakow International Film Festival - Krakowski Festiwal Filmowy, Krakow, 2011
- International Documentary Film Festival - Documentamadrid, Madrid, 2011
- International Human Rights Film Festival - Docudays UA, Kyiv, 2011
- National Laurel Award for the best documentary, Moscow, 2010.
- Artdocfest, Moscow, 2010.
- International Documentary Film Festival in Amsterdam, IDFA, 2010.
- Kyiv International Film Festival, 2010 - Jury Diploma.
