= Orange Revolution (film) =

2007 feature-length documentary film

- Orange Revolution promotional poster
- Directed by: Steve York
- Written by: Steve York
- Produced by: Steve York
- Edited by: Joe Wiedenmayer
- Release date: April 1, 2007 (USA)
- Running time: 92 minutes
- Country: United States
- Language: English/Ukrainian/Russian

Orange Revolution (Ukrainian: «Помаранчева революція», romanized: Pomarancheva revoliutsiia, Russian: «Оранжевая революция», romanized: Oranzhevaya revolyutsiya) is a 2007 feature-length documentary produced by York Zimmerman Inc. and directed by Steve York capturing the massive street protests that followed the rigged 2004 presidential elections in Ukraine (a.k.a. the Orange Revolution).

== Awards ==
- 2007 President's Award, Chicago International Documentary Film Festival
- 2007 Bronze Plaque, Columbus International Film Festival
- 2007 Proskar Award for Best Documentary, Seattle International Film Festival

== Screenings and festivals ==
- 2009 Council on Foreign Relations, Washington, D.C.
- 2009 The Metta Center for Nonviolence, Berkeley, CA
- 2009 University of British Columbia, Canada "Cinema Politica: Screening Truth to Power" Series
- 2009 Cairo Human Rights Film Festival
- 2008 Portland Art Museum
- 2008 Harvard Law School
- 2007 The San Francisco International Film Festival
- 2007 DOCNZ Film Festival, New Zealand Asia Pacific Premiere
- 2007 Hot Docs: Canadian International Documentary Film Festival, Toronto Canadian Premiere
- 2007 Seattle International Film Festival
- 2007 AFI Fest, Los Angeles
- 2007 United Nations International Film Festival, Stanford University
- 2007 Chicago International Documentary Film Festival World Premiere

== See also ==
- Orange Winter
