= Orange Revolution =

2004–2005 political protests in Ukraine

- Part of the Colour Revolutions
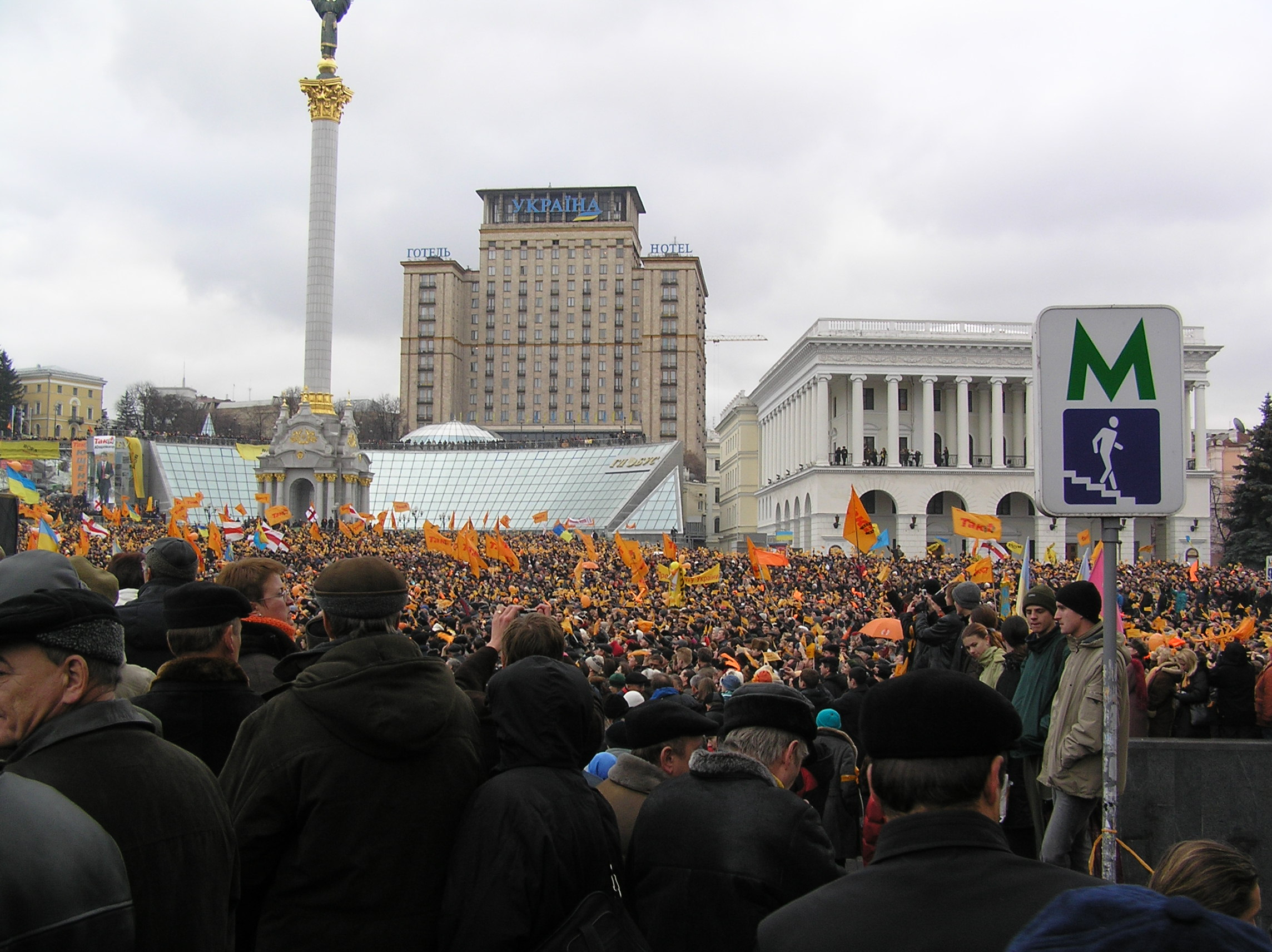
- Orange-clad demonstrators gather in the Independence Square in Kyiv on 22 November 2004.
- Date: 22 November 2004 – 23 January 2005 (2 months and 1 day)
- Location: Ukraine, primarily Kyiv
- Caused by: The Kuchmagate crisis severely undermined the legitimacy of President Leonid Kuchma and "his candidate" Prime Minister Viktor Yanukovych; Disputed results of the second round of the 2004 Ukrainian presidential election
- Goals: Annulment of results of the second round of the 2004 presidential elections; Anti‐oligarch and anti‐corruption measures
- Methods: Demonstrations, civil disobedience, civil resistance, strike actions
- Result: Revote ordered by the Supreme Court of Ukraine; Viktor Yushchenko declared winner

Parties
Opposition: Pora; Our Ukraine; Yulia Tymoshenko Bloc; UNA-UNSO; Socialist Party; Supported by: Poland; United States	Government: Yanukovych I cabinet; Party of Regions; Communist Party; Progressive Socialist Party; Russian Bloc; Supported by: Russia

Lead figures
Viktor Yushchenko; Yulia Tymoshenko	Leonid Kuchma; Viktor Medvedchuk; Viktor Yanukovych (Russia) Vladimir Putin

Number
Central Kyiv: hundreds of thousands up to one million by some estimates	

Casualties
- Deaths: 1 man died from a heart attack

The Orange Revolution (Ukrainian: Помаранчева революція, romanized: Pomarancheva revoliutsiia) was a series of protests that led to political upheaval in Ukraine from late November 2004 to January 2005. It gained momentum primarily due to the initiative of the general population, sparked by the aftermath of the 2004 Ukrainian presidential election runoff which was claimed to be marred by massive corruption, voter intimidation, and electoral fraud. Kyiv, the Ukrainian capital, was the focal point of the movement's campaign of civil resistance, with thousands of protesters demonstrating daily. Nationwide, this was highlighted by a series of acts of civil disobedience, sit-ins, and general strikes organized by the opposition movement.

The protests were prompted by reports from several domestic and foreign election monitors as well as the widespread public perception that the results of the run-off vote of 21 November 2004 between leading candidates Viktor Yushchenko and Viktor Yanukovych were rigged by the authorities in favour of the latter. The nationwide protests succeeded when the results of the original runoff were annulled, and a re-vote was ordered by Ukraine's Supreme Court for 26 December 2004. Under intense scrutiny by domestic and international observers, the second run-off was declared to be "free and fair." The final results showed a clear victory for Yushchenko, who received about 52% of the vote, compared to Yanukovych's 44%. Yushchenko was declared the official winner, and with his inauguration on 23 January 2005 in Kyiv, the Orange Revolution ended. In the following years, the Orange Revolution had a negative connotation among pro-government circles in Belarus and Russia.

In the 2010 presidential election, Yanukovych became Yushchenko's successor as President of Ukraine after the Central Election Commission and international observers declared that the presidential election was conducted fairly.

== Background ==
=== Gongadze assassination or Kuchmagate crisis ===
Georgiy Gongadze, a Ukrainian journalist and the founder of Ukrayinska Pravda (a newspaper well known for publicising the corruption or unethical conduct of Ukrainian politicians), was kidnapped and murdered in 2000. Persistent rumours suggested that Ukrainian president Leonid Kuchma had ordered the killing. Gen. Oleksiy Pukach, a former police officer, was accused of the murder under the orders of a former minister who committed suicide in 2005. Pukach was arrested in 2010 and was sentenced to life in prison in 2013. The murder sparked a movement against Kuchma in 2000 that may be seen as the origin of the Orange Revolution in 2004. After two terms of presidency (1994–1999) and the Cassette Scandal of 2000 that significantly damaged his image, Kuchma decided not to run for a third term in the 2004 elections and instead supported Prime Minister Viktor Yanukovych in the presidential race against Viktor Yushchenko of the Our Ukraine–People's Self-Defense Bloc.

=== Causes of the Orange Revolution ===
The state of Ukraine during the 2004 presidential election was considered to be in "ideal condition" for an outburst from the public. During this time, Ukrainians were impatient while waiting for the economic and political transformation. The results of the election were thought to be fraudulent.

The Revolution empowered many Ukrainians to take to the streets and participate in the protests, some lasting as long as seventeen days. The protests did not enjoy national participation but were mostly joined by western and central Ukrainians. Ukraine gained independence in 1991 and it was the quest for that independence that supported the Orange Revolution. Ukrainians for the most part did not want to be too closely associated with the past history of the Soviet Union. The Austro-Hungarian roots in the eastern European geo-cultural area of Ukraine (formerly known as Poland-Lithuania) helped shape the modern-day Ukrainian national identity.

=== Factors enabling the Orange Revolution ===
The Ukrainian regime prior to the Orange Revolution sought to create a path for democratization. Ukraine was considered a "competitive authoritarian regime" that is gradually transitioning into a hybrid regime, allowing for room to fully transition into a liberal democracy, with a market based economy. The Ukrainian electorate sought to elect a candidate to bring economic and political reforms. Yushchenko quickly established himself as the leading candidate in calling for these reforms.

Yushchenko was a charismatic candidate who did not appear to be corrupt and presented his ideas in a "non-Soviet" way. Young Ukrainian voters were important to the outcome of the 2004 presidential election. This new wave of younger people born in a post-Soviet Ukraine held a negative view of Kuchma and his ability to lead their country, an aftereffect of the cassette scandal.

The abundance of younger people who participated showed an increasing sense of nationalism that was developing in the country. The Orange Revolution had enough popular impact that it interested people of all ages.

=== Visits of Vladimir Putin to Ukraine in 2004 ===
In 2004, Russian president Vladimir Putin visited Ukraine numerous times. The Party of Regions received large donations from Moscow, estimated at between $50 million and $300 million. Putin tasked his chief of staff, Dmitry Medvedev, with leading political operations in Ukraine. Medvedev sent trusted advisors, including Gleb Pavlovsky and Sergei Markov, to Ukraine. In August 2004, Kremlin political activists opened a room called “Russia House” in a hotel in central Kyiv to run the Kremlin's campaign for Yanukovych.

== Prelude to the Orange Revolution ==
=== Political alliances ===
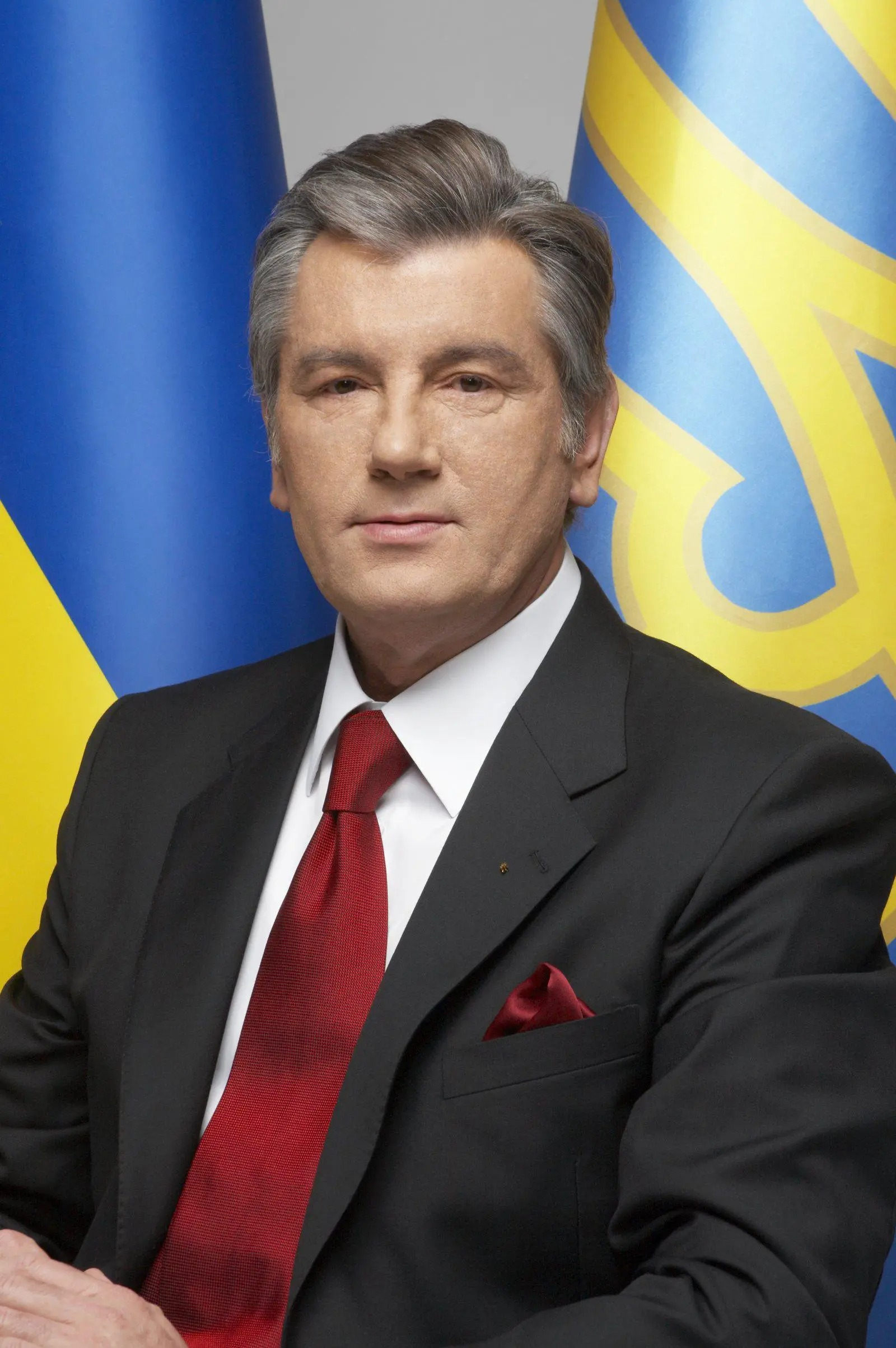
Viktor Yushchenko, Yanukovych's antagonist

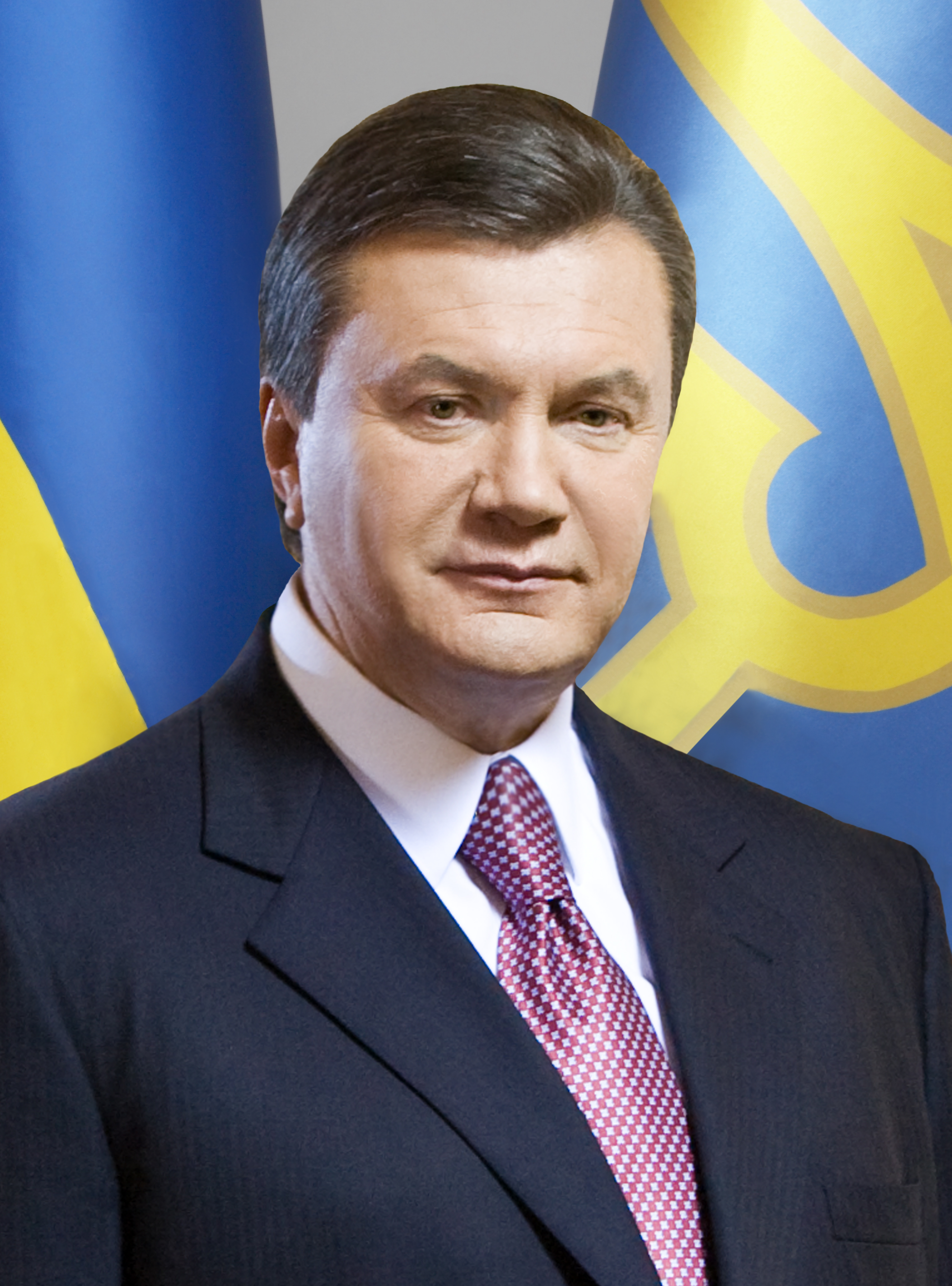
Viktor Yanukovych, Yushchenko's main opposition

In late 2002, Viktor Yushchenko (Our Ukraine), Oleksandr Moroz (Socialist Party of Ukraine), Petro Symonenko (Communist Party of Ukraine), and Yulia Tymoshenko (Yulia Tymoshenko Bloc) issued a joint statement concerning "the beginning of a state revolution in Ukraine." The communists left the alliance: Symonenko opposed the idea of a single candidate from the alliance in the Ukrainian presidential election of 2004, but the other three parties remained allies until July 2006. (In the autumn of 2001, both Tymoshenko and Yushchenko had broached the idea of setting up such a coalition).

On 2 July 2004, Our Ukraine and the Yulia Tymoshenko Bloc established the Force of the People, a coalition that aimed to stop "the destructive process that has, as a result of the incumbent authorities, become a characteristic for Ukraine"—at the time, President Kuchma and prime minister Yanukovych were the "incumbent authorities" in Ukraine. The pact included a promise by Viktor Yushchenko to nominate Tymoshenko as Prime Minister if Yushchenko won the October 2004 presidential election.

=== 2004 Ukraine presidential election campaign ===
An orange ribbon, a symbol of the Ukrainian Orange Revolution. Ribbons are common symbols of non-violent protest.

The 2004 presidential election in Ukraine eventually featured two main candidates:

- sitting prime minister Viktor Yanukovych, largely supported by Leonid Kuchma (the outgoing president who had already served two terms in office from 1994 and was precluded from running himself due to the term limits under the constitution)
- the opposition candidate Viktor Yushchenko, leader of the Our Ukraine faction in the Ukrainian parliament and a former prime minister (in office 1999–2001)

The election took place in a highly charged atmosphere, with the Yanukovych team and the outgoing president's administration using their control of the government and state apparatus for intimidation of Yushchenko and his supporters. In September 2004 Yushchenko suffered dioxin poisoning under mysterious circumstances. While he survived and returned to the campaign trail, the poisoning undermined his health and altered his appearance dramatically (his face remains disfigured by the consequences to this day).

The two main candidates were neck and neck in the first-round vote held on 31 October 2004, winning 39.32% (Yanukovych) and 39.87% (Yushchenko) of the votes cast. The candidates who came third and fourth collected much less: Oleksandr Moroz of the Socialist Party of Ukraine and Petro Symonenko of the Communist Party of Ukraine received 5.82% and 4.97%, respectively. Since no candidate had won more than 50% of the cast ballots, Ukrainian law mandated a runoff vote between two leading candidates. After the announcement of the runoff, Oleksandr Moroz threw his support behind Viktor Yushchenko. The Progressive Socialist Party's Nataliya Vitrenko, who won 1.53% of the vote, endorsed Yanukovych, who hoped for Petro Symonenko's endorsement but did not receive it.

In the wake of the first round of the election, many complaints emerged regarding voting irregularities in favour of the government-supported Yanukovych. However, clearly neither nominee performed well enough to claim an outright majority in the first round. Challenging the results would not have changed that outcome. So the complaints were not actively pursued, and both candidates concentrated on the upcoming runoff, scheduled for 21 November.

Pora! activists were arrested in October 2004, but the release of many (reportedly on President Kuchma's personal order) gave growing confidence to the opposition.

Yushchenko's supporters originally adopted orange as the signifying colour of his election campaign. Later, the colour gave its name to an entire series of political labels, such as the Oranges (Pomaranchevi in Ukrainian) for his political camp and its supporters. At the time when the mass protests grew, and especially when they brought about political change in the country, the term "Orange Revolution" came to represent the entire series of events.

In view of the success of using colour as a symbol to mobilise supporters, the Yanukovych camp chose blue for themselves.

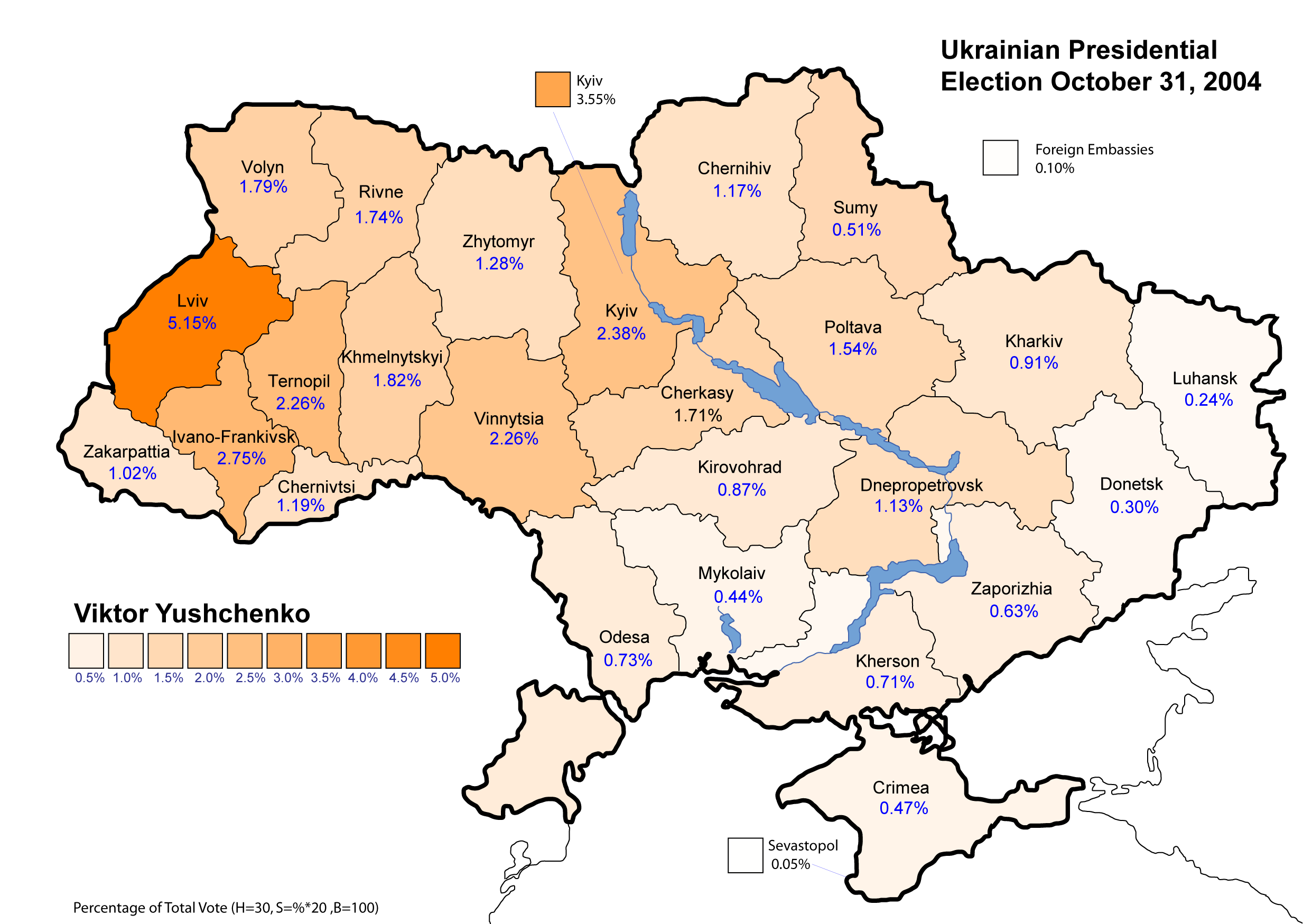
Viktor Yushchenko (first round) – percentage of total national vote

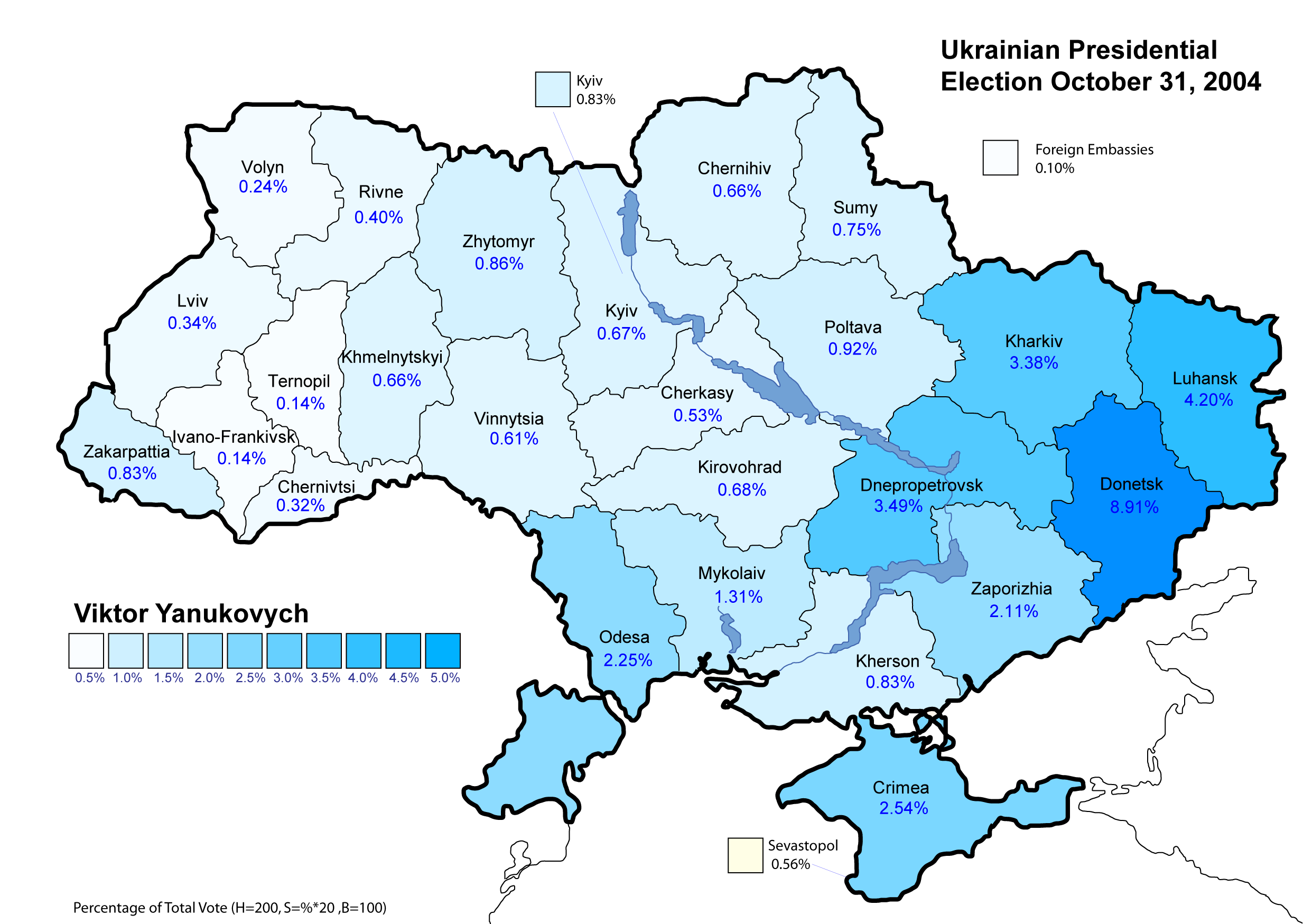
Viktor Yanukovych (first round) – percentage of total national vote

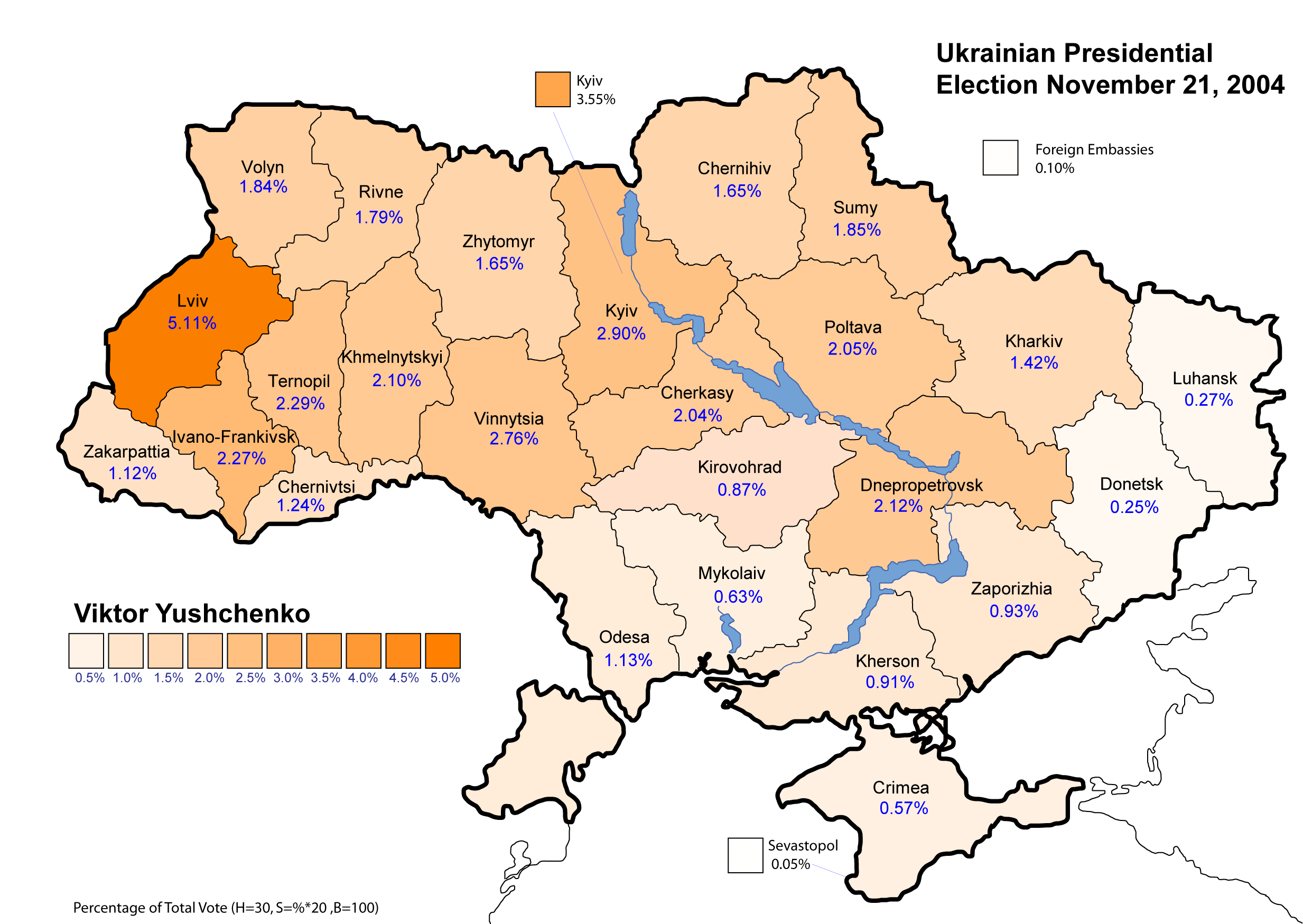
Viktor Yushchenko (second round) – percentage of total national vote

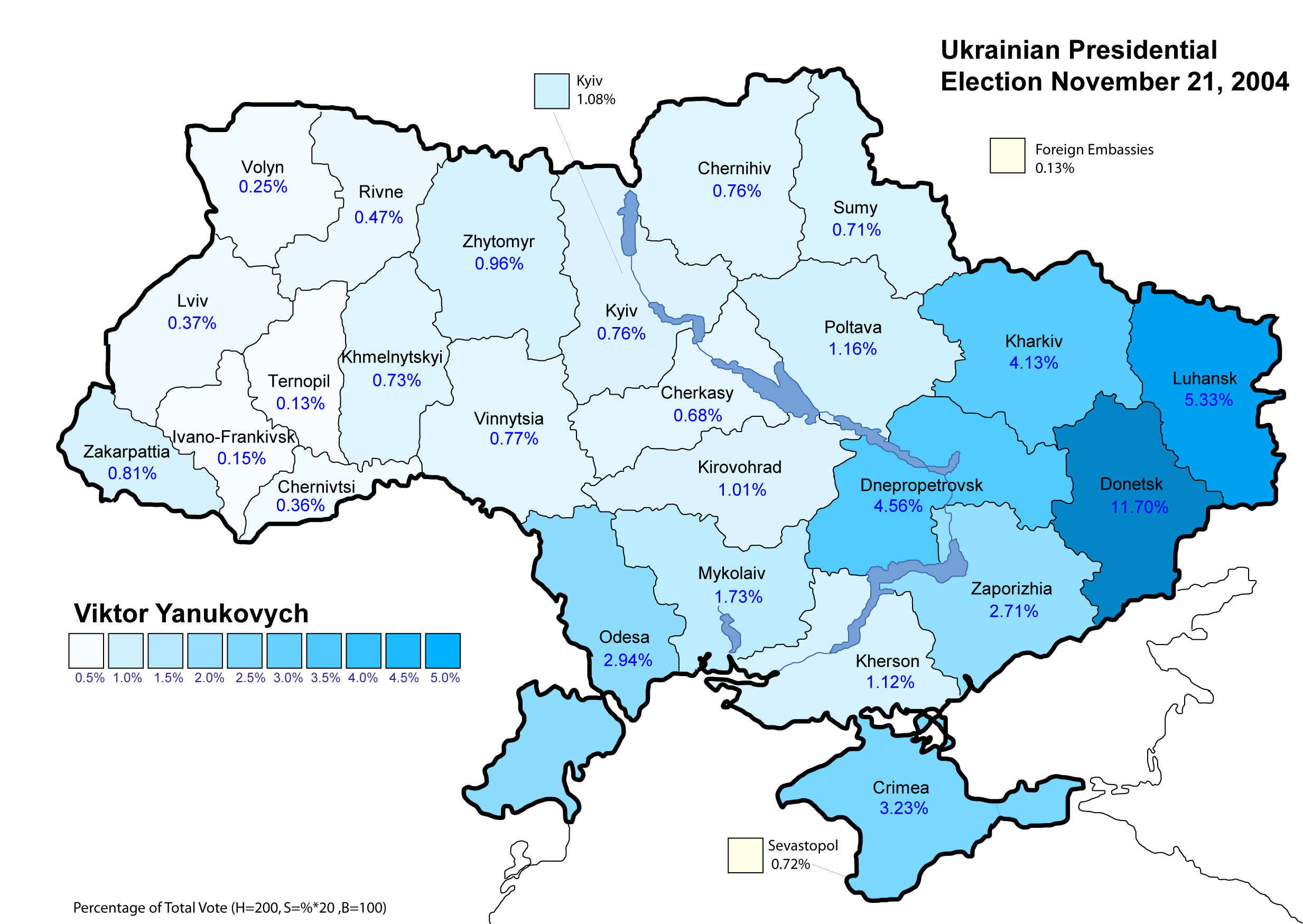
Viktor Yanukovych (second round) – percentage of total national vote

== Protests ==
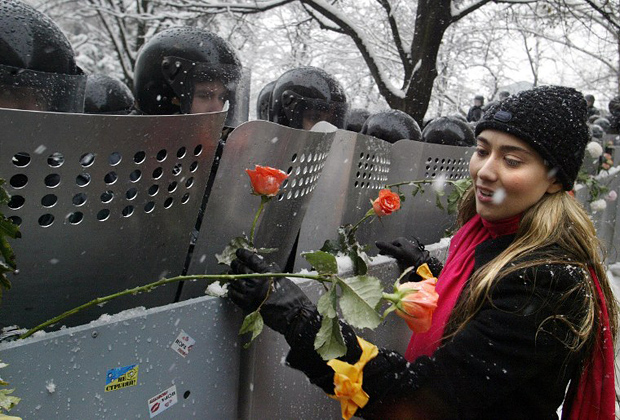
Protest during the Orange Revolution

Protests began on the eve of the second round of voting, as the official count differed markedly from exit poll results, which gave Yushchenko up to an 11% lead, while official results gave the election win to Yanukovych by 3%. While Yanukovych supporters have claimed that Yushchenko's connections to the Ukrainian media explain this disparity, the Yushchenko team publicised evidence of many incidents of electoral fraud in favour of the government-backed Yanukovych, witnessed by many local and foreign observers. These accusations were reinforced by similar allegations, though at a lesser scale, during the first presidential run of 31 October.

The Yushchenko campaign publicly called for protest on the dawn of election day, 21 November 2004, when allegations of fraud began to spread in the form of leaflets printed and distributed by the 'Democratic Initiatives' foundation, announcing that Yushchenko had won—on the basis of its exit poll. Beginning on 22 November 2004, massive protests (Note: On 6 November 2013 Pora! had organised the first tent camp in Kyiv.) started in cities across Ukraine. The largest, in Kyiv's Maidan Nezalezhnosti (Independence Square), attracted an estimated 500,000 participants, who on 23 November 2004 peacefully marched in front of the headquarters of the Verkhovna Rada, the Ukrainian parliament, many wearing orange or carrying orange flags, the colour of Yushchenko's campaign coalition. One of the most prominent activists of that time was Paraska Korolyuk, subsequently bestowed with the Order of Princess Olga. From 22 November, Pora! undertook the management of the protests in Kyiv until the end of the demonstration.

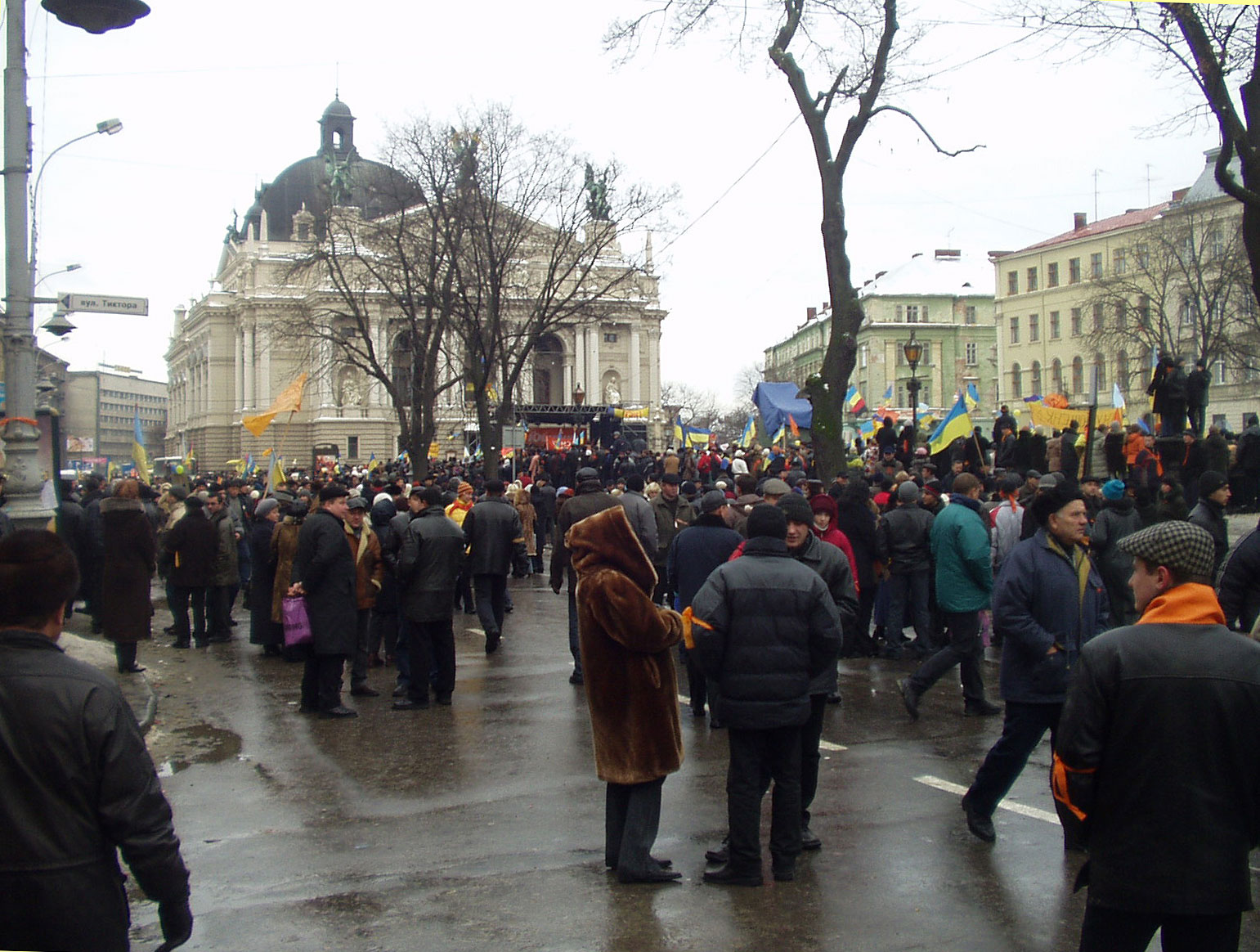
Protests in Lviv, late November 2004

The local councils in Kyiv, Lviv, and several other cities passed, with the wide popular support of their constituency, a largely symbolic refusal to accept the legitimacy of the official election results, and Yushchenko took a symbolic presidential oath. This "oath" taken by Yushchenko in half-empty parliament chambers, lacking the quorum as only the Yushchenko-leaning factions were present, could not have had any legal effect. But it was an important symbolic gesture meant to demonstrate the resolve of the Yushchenko campaign not to accept the compromised election results. In response, Yushchenko's opponents denounced him for taking an illegitimate oath, and even some of his moderate supporters were ambivalent about this act, while a more radical side of the Yushchenko camp demanded he act even more decisively. Some observers argued that this symbolic presidential oath might have been useful to the Yushchenko camp if events had taken a more confrontational route. In such a scenario, this "presidential oath" that Yushchenko took could be used to lend legitimacy to the claim that he, rather than his rival who tried to gain the presidency through alleged fraud, was a true commander-in-chief authorised to give orders to the military and security agencies.

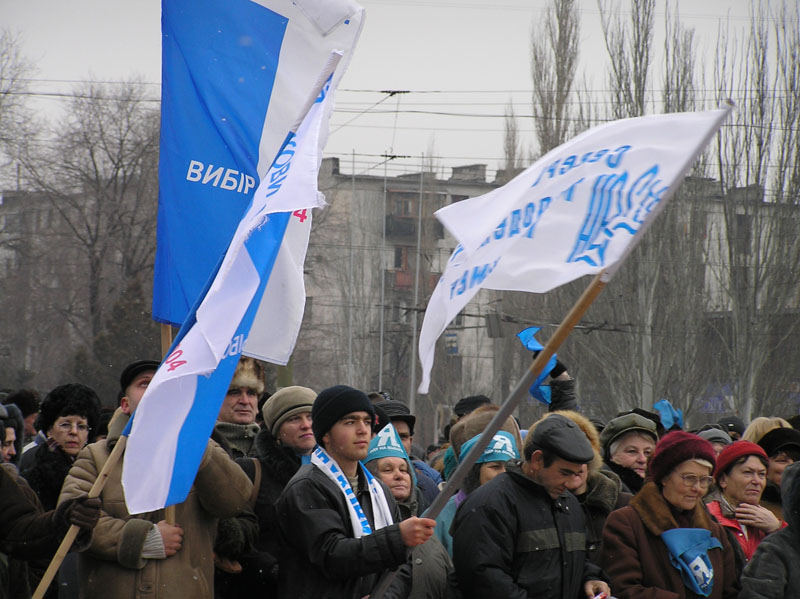
Pro-Yanukovych demonstration in Siverskodonetsk, where deputies allied to the Party of Regions threatened to separate from Ukraine in case of Yushchenko's victory

At the same time, local officials in Eastern and Southern Ukraine, the stronghold of Viktor Yanukovych, started a series of actions alluding to the possibility of the breakup of Ukraine or an extra-constitutional federalisation of the country, should their candidate's claimed victory be unrecognised. Demonstrations of public support for Yanukovych were held throughout Eastern Ukraine, and some of his supporters arrived in Kyiv. In Kyiv the pro-Yanukovych demonstrators were far outnumbered by Yushchenko supporters, whose ranks were continuously swelled by new arrivals from many regions of Ukraine. The scale of the demonstrations in Kyiv was unprecedented. By many estimates, on some days they drew up to one million people to the streets, in freezing weather.

In total, 18.4% of Ukrainians have claimed to have taken part in the Orange Revolution (across Ukraine).

== Political developments ==
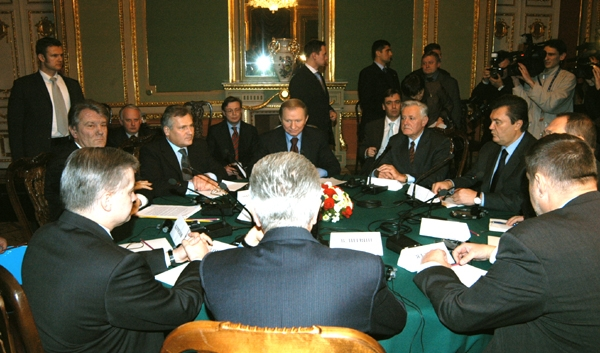
Round table talks in Kyiv on 1 December 2004, involving Viktor Yushchenko, Aleksander Kwasniewski, Leonid Kuchma, Valdas Adamkus, Viktor Yanukovych, Javier Solana, Ján Kubiš, Boris Gryzlov and Volodymyr Lytvyn

Although Yushchenko entered into negotiations with outgoing president Kuchma in an effort to peacefully resolve the situation, the negotiations broke up on 24 November 2004. Yanukovych was officially certified as the victor by the Central Election Commission, which itself was allegedly involved in falsification of electoral results by withholding the information it was receiving from local districts and running a parallel illegal computer server to manipulate the results. The next morning after the certification took place, Yushchenko spoke to supporters in Kyiv, urging them to begin a series of mass protests, general strikes, and sit-ins with the intent of crippling the government and forcing it to concede defeat.

In view of the threat of illegitimate government acceding to power, Yushchenko's camp announced the creation of the Committee of National Salvation, which declared a nationwide political strike.

On 1 December 2004, the Verkhovna Rada passed a resolution that strongly condemned pro-separatist and federalisation actions, and passed a non-confidence vote in the Cabinet of Ministers of Ukraine, a decision Prime Minister Yanukovych refused to recognise. By the Constitution of Ukraine, the non-confidence vote mandated the government's resignation, but the parliament had no means to enforce a resignation without the cooperation of Prime Minister Yanukovych and outgoing president Kuchma.

On 3 December 2004, Ukraine's Supreme Court finally broke the political deadlock. The court decided that due to the scale of the electoral fraud, it became impossible to establish the election results. Therefore, it invalidated the official results that would have given Yanukovych the presidency. As a resolution, the court ordered a re-vote of the run-off to be held on 26 December 2004. This decision was seen as a victory for the Yushchenko camp, while Yanukovych and his supporters favoured a rerun of the entire election rather than just the run-off as a second-best option should Yanukovych not be awarded the presidency. On 8 December 2004 the parliament amended laws to provide a legal framework for the new round of elections. The parliament also approved the changes to the Constitution, implementing a political reform backed by outgoing president Kuchma as a part of a political compromise between the acting authorities and opposition.

In November 2009 Yanukovych stated that although his victory in the election was "taken away," he gave up this victory in order to avoid bloodshed. "I didn't want mothers to lose their children and wives their husbands. I didn't want dead bodies from Kyiv to flow down the Dnipro. I didn't want to assume power through bloodshed."

=== Re-run election ===
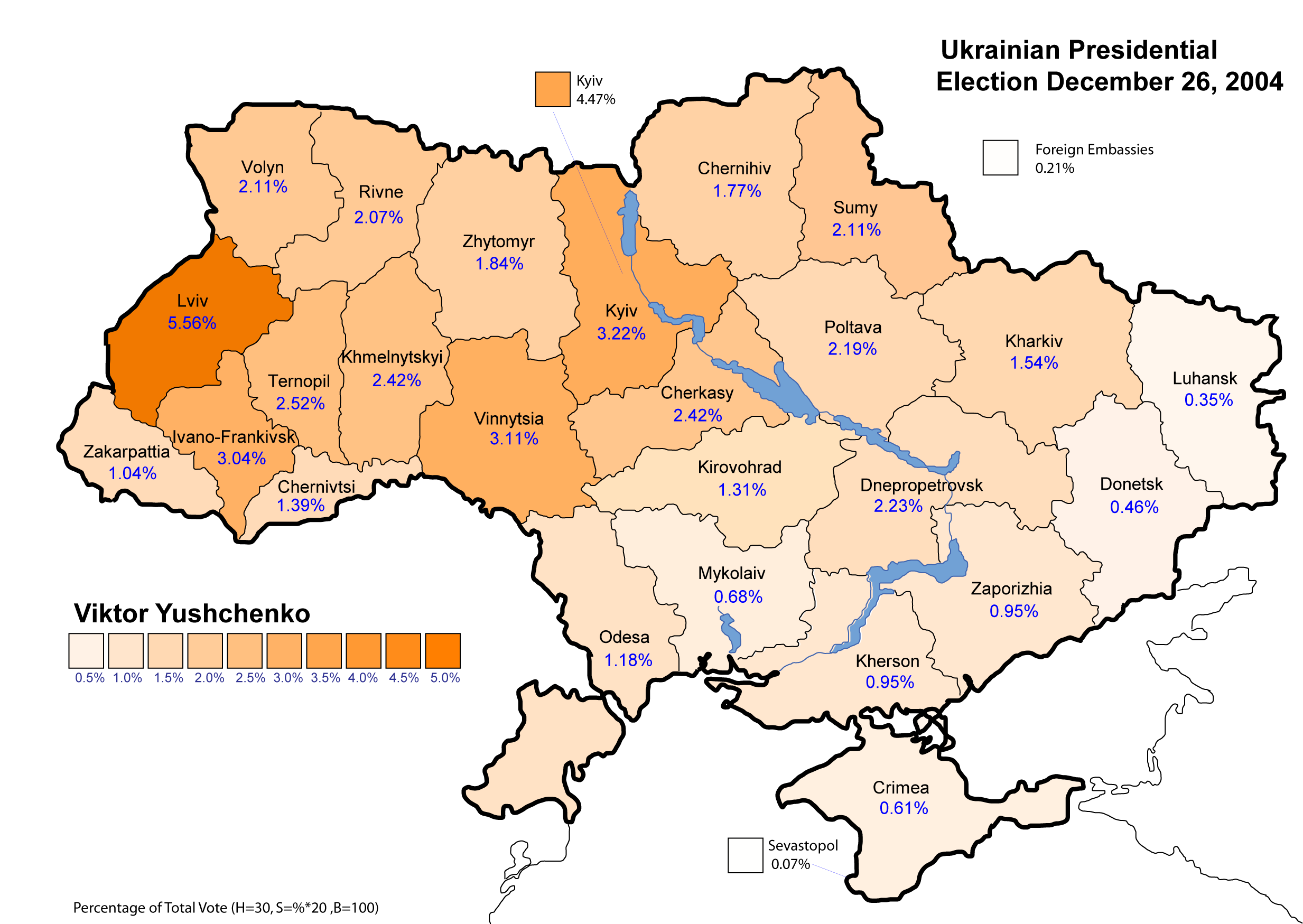
Viktor Yushchenko (Final round) – percentage of total national vote

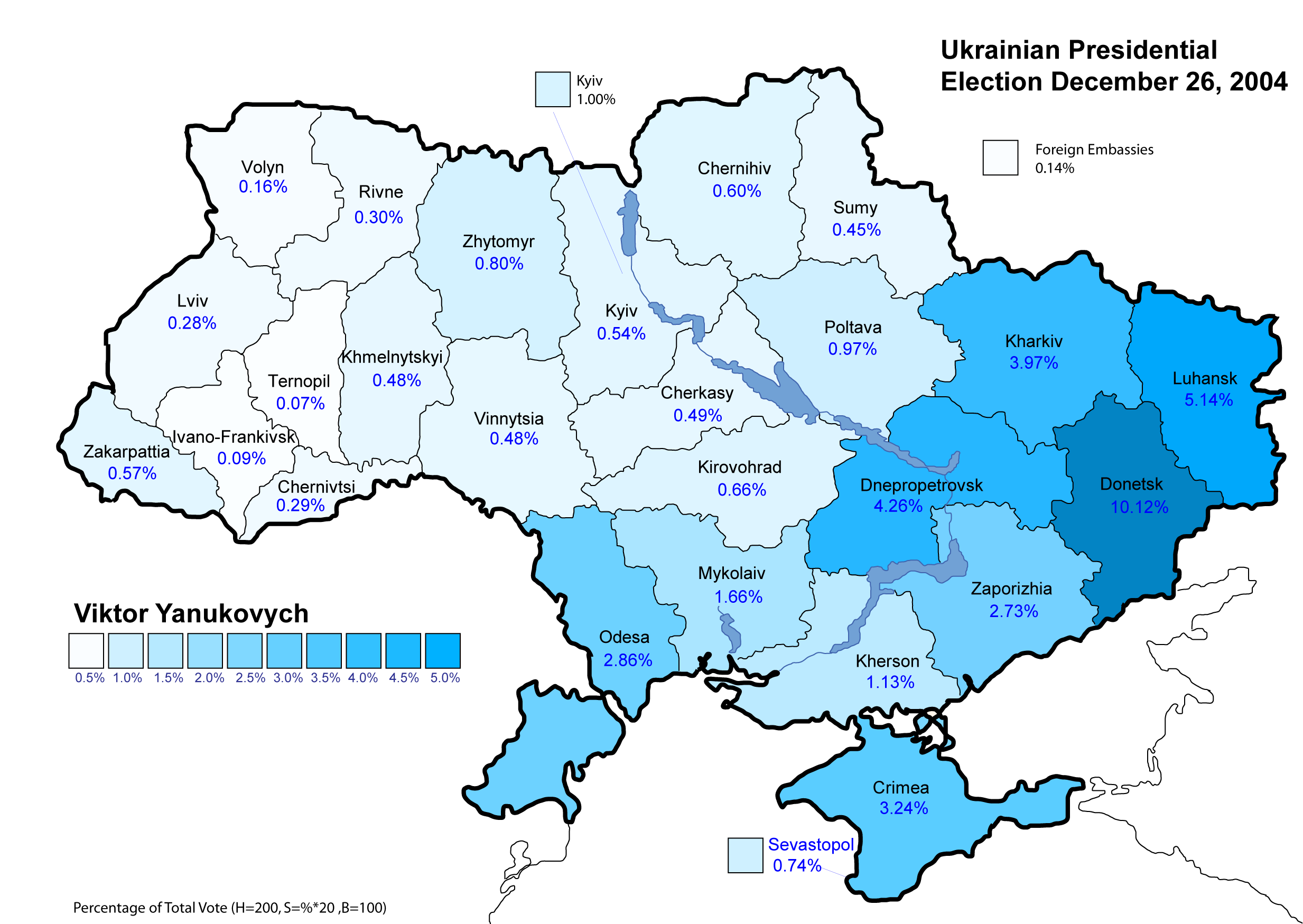
Viktor Yanukovych (Final round) – percentage of total national vote

The 26 December revote was held under intense scrutiny by local and international observers. The preliminary results, announced by the Central Election Commission on 18 December, gave Yushchenko and Yanukovych 51.99% and 44.20% of the total vote, which represented a change in the vote by +5.39% for Yushchenko and −5.27% for Yanukovych respectively when compared to the November poll. The Yanukovych team attempted to mount a fierce legal challenge to the election results using both the Ukrainian courts and the Election Commission complaint procedures. However, all their complaints were dismissed as without merit by both the Supreme Court of Ukraine and the Central Election Commission. On 10 January 2005, the Election Commission officially declared Yushchenko as the winner of the presidential election with the final results falling within 0.01% of the preliminary ones. This Election Commission announcement cleared the way for Yushchenko's inauguration as the president of Ukraine. The official ceremony took place in the Verkhovna Rada building on 23 January 2005 and was followed by the "public inauguration" of the newly sworn President at Maidan Nezalezhnosti (Independence Square) in front of hundreds of thousands of his supporters. This event brought the Ukrainian Orange Revolution to its peaceful conclusion.

== Role of Ukrainian intelligence and security agencies ==
According to one version of events recounted by The New York Times, Ukrainian security agencies played an unusual role in the Orange Revolution, with a KGB successor agency in the former Soviet state providing qualified support to the political opposition. As per the paper report, on 28 November 2004, over 10,000 MVS (Internal Ministry) troops were mobilised to put down the protests in Independence Square in Kyiv by the order of their commander, Lt. Gen. Sergei Popkov. The SBU (Security Service of Ukraine, a successor to the KGB in Ukraine) warned opposition leaders of the crackdown. Oleksander Galaka, head of GUR (military intelligence), made calls to "prevent bloodshed." Col. Gen. Ihor Smeshko (SBU chief) and Maj. Gen. Vitaly Romanchenko (military counter-intelligence chief) both claimed to have warned Popkov to pull back his troops, which he did, preventing bloodshed.

In addition to the desire to avoid bloodshed, the New York Times article suggests that siloviki, as the security officers are often called in the countries of the former Soviet Union, were motivated by personal aversion to the possibility of having to serve President Yanukovych, who was in his youth convicted of robbery and assault and had alleged connections with corrupt businessmen, especially if he were to ascend to the presidency by fraud. The personal feelings of Gen. Smeshko towards Yanukovych may also have played a role. Additional evidence of Yushchenko's popularity and at least partial support among the SBU officers is shown by the fact that several embarrassing proofs of electoral fraud, including incriminating wiretap recordings of conversations among the Yanukovych campaign and government officials discussing how to rig the election, were provided to the Yushchenko camp. These conversations were likely recorded and provided to the opposition by sympathisers in the Ukrainian Security Services.

According to Abel Polese, Kuchma was concerned about its reputation in the West; because of a lack of natural resources to finance his regime, he had to show a commitment to democracy in order to be targeted for Western financial assistance.

== U.S. involvement in the revolution ==
In February 2004, an editorial, "A Chestnut Revolution," appeared in The Wall Street Journal, the author of which wrote that "Ukraine offers the best chance to build on the Georgian success in popular democracy—as long as the West and the democratic opposition play their cards right." The note also says that the United States has already spent $2 billion to support a "free and independent" Ukraine, and it would be better if this money went to support Kuchma's democratic rivals, whose actions are inspired by Georgia and Serbia.

Adrian Karatnycky, a senior researcher at Freedom House, who was born in New York into a family of Ukrainian immigrants, has repeatedly traveled to Ukraine to meet with representatives of public groups and figures of the country's political elite, as well as people from Viktor Yushchenko's team. When opposition candidate Yushchenko visited New York, Karatnycky acted as a connector, organizing meetings with American associations, such as the Conference of Presidents of Major American Jewish Organizations. A year before the elections, Karatnycky, together with NDI and Freedom House, gathered 1,023 observers from Central and Eastern Europe, who organized the European Network of Election Monitoring Organizations. Karatnycky himself took a direct part as an observer during the second round of the presidential elections and witnessed violations.

In August 2004, he took part in a training camp for Ukrainian activists; according to him, "Croatians, Romanians, Slovaks, and Serbians—leaders of the group that led civic opposition to Milošević—taught Ukrainian kids how to ‘control the temperature’ of protesting crowds." Democratic activists were trained on how to resist government pressure, as well as establish communication with the public and the police. Karatnycky also served as president of Freedom House from 1996 to 2003 and executive director from 1993 to 1996, and in this position, helped create a network of centers and public organizations in Ukraine engaged in monitoring the media and elections. On November 30, 2004, at the very beginning of the protests, Karatnycky stated in his speech at the Knickerbocker Club: "I think the ‘orange revolution’ will win this time, and I can’t conceive of a set of circumstances under which Yushchenko won’t be president of the country."

In the two years before the 2004 Ukrainian presidential election, the United States spent $65 million "to aid political organizations in Ukraine, paying to bring opposition leader Viktor Yushchenko to meet U.S. leaders and helping to underwrite exit polls indicating he won a disputed runoff election." State Department spokesman Richard A. Boucher said that the U.S. money was not going to help a particular candidate, but to institutions that are necessary for free elections. Freedom House and the National Democratic Institute also funded civic groups that counted votes and announced exit poll results. In late November 2004, Senator Richard Lugar arrived in Kyiv as a representative of President George W. Bush and delivered a message to President Leonid Kuchma: "You play a central role in ensuring that Ukraine’s election is democratic and free of fraud and manipulation. A tarnished election, however, will lead us to review our relations with Ukraine."

== Internet usage ==
Throughout the demonstrations, Ukraine's emerging Internet usage (facilitated by news sites that began to disseminate the Kuchma tapes) was an integral part of the orange revolutionary process. It has even been suggested that the Orange Revolution was the first example of an internet-organised mass protest. Analysts believe that the internet and mobile phones allowed an alternative media to flourish that was not subject to self-censorship or overt control by President Kuchma, and his allies and pro-democracy activists (such as Pora!) were able to use mobile phones and the Internet to coordinate election monitoring and mass protests.

== 2004 Ukrainian constitutional changes ==
As part of the Orange Revolution, the Ukrainian constitution was changed to shift powers from the presidency to the parliament. This was Oleksandr Moroz's price for his decisive role in winning Yushchenko the presidency. The Communists also supported these measures. These came into effect in 2006, during which Yanukovych's Party of Regions won the parliamentary election, creating a coalition government with the Socialists and the Communists under his leadership. As a result, President Viktor Yushchenko had to deal with a powerful Prime Minister Viktor Yanukovych who had control of many important portfolios. His premiership ended in late 2007 after Yushchenko had succeeded in his months-long attempt to dissolve parliament. After the election, Yanukovych's party again was the largest, but Tymoshenko's finished far ahead of Yushchenko's for second place. The Orange parties won a very narrow majority, permitting a new government under Tymoshenko, but Yushchenko's political decline continued to his poor showing in the 2010 presidential election.

On 1 October 2010, the Constitutional Court of Ukraine overturned the 2004 amendments, considering them unconstitutional.

== 2010 presidential election ==
A circuit administrative court in Kyiv forbade mass actions at Maidan Nezalezhnosti from 9 January 2010 to 5 February 2010. The mayor's office had requested this in order to avoid "nonstandard situations" during the aftermath of the 2010 presidential election. Apparently (in particular), the Party of Regions, All-Ukrainian Union "Fatherland," and Svoboda had applied for a permit to demonstrate there. Incumbent President Viktor Yushchenko got a dismal 5.45% of votes during the election. "Ukraine is a European democratic country," said Yushchenko in a sort of political will at the polling station. "It is a free nation and free people." According to him, this is one of the great achievements of the Orange Revolution.

In the 2010 presidential election Viktor Yanukovych was declared the winner, which was labeled by some Yanukovych supporters as "an end to this Orange nightmare." Immediately after his election Yanukovych promised to "clear the debris of misunderstanding and old problems that emerged during the years of the Orange power." According to influential Party of Regions member Rinat Akhmetov, the ideals of the Orange Revolution won at the 2010 election. "We had a fair and democratic independent election. The entire world recognised it, and international observers confirmed its results. That's why the ideals of the Orange Revolution won." According to Yulia Tymoshenko, the 2010 elections were a missed "chance to become a worthy member of the European family and to put an end to the rule of the oligarchy."

== Aftermath ==
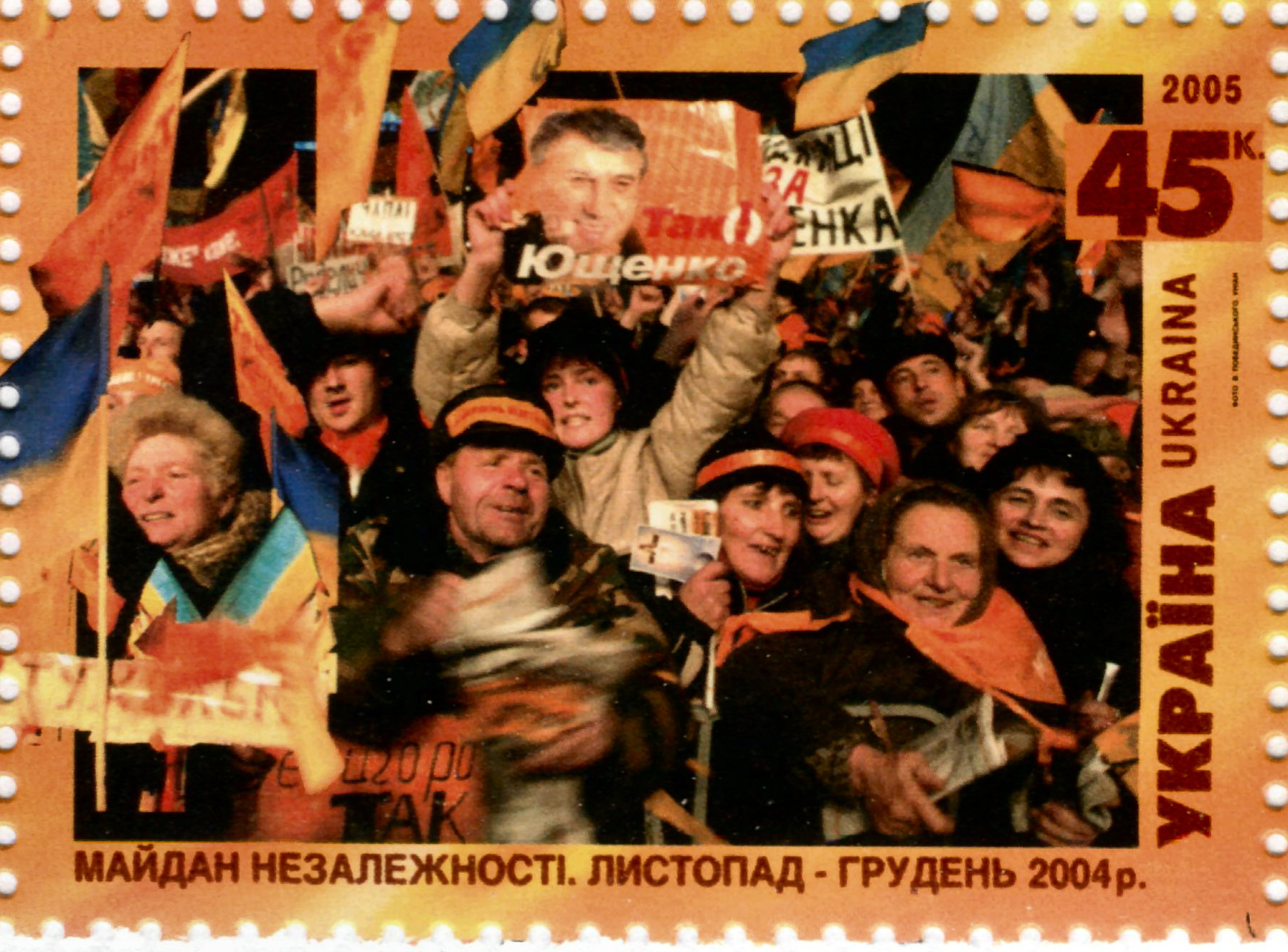
A stamp of Ukraine issued in 2005 in honour of the Orange Revolution

President Viktor Yushchenko decreed in 2005 that 22 November (the starting day of the Orange Revolution) will be a non-public holiday, named "Day of Freedom." This date was moved to 22 January (and merged with Unification Day) by President Viktor Yanukovych in late December 2011. President Yanukovych stated he moved "Day of Freedom" because of "numerous appeals from the public." (Note: Mid-October 2014 President Petro Poroshenko undid Yanukovych's merging of Unification Day when he decreed that 21 November will be celebrated as "Day of Dignity and Freedom" in honour of the Euromaidan-protests that started on 21 November 2013.)

Outright vote rigging diminished after the 2004 presidential election. No officials involved in the 2004 elections that preceded the Orange Revolution were convicted for election fraud.

A 2007 study revealed that opinion about the nature of the Orange Revolution had barely shifted since 2004 and that the attitudes about it in the country remained divided along the same largely geographical lines that they had been at the time of the revolution (West and Central Ukraine being more positive about the events and South and Eastern Ukraine more cynical (seniors also). This research also showed that Ukrainians in total had a less positive view on the Orange Revolution in 2007 than they had in 2005. It has been suggested that since the Orange Revolution was impactful enough to interest people of all ages, and that it has increased the overall unity of Ukraine.

During the election campaign of the 2012 Ukrainian parliamentary election the Party of Regions' campaign focused heavily on (what they called) "the chaos and ruins of 5 years of orange leadership."

=== Outside Ukraine ===
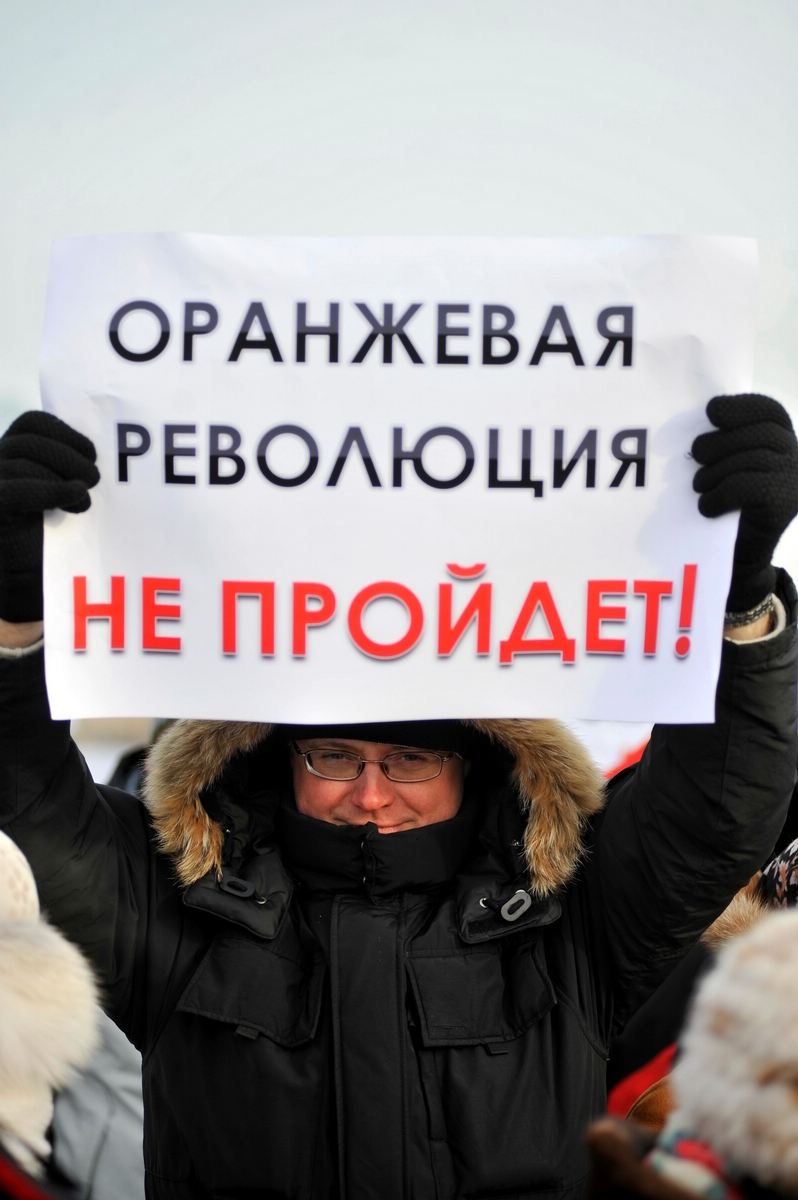
From the 4 February 2012 "Anti-Orange" protests in Russia; banner reads (in Russian) "Orange Revolution will not pass!"

In March 2005 Ukrainian Foreign Minister Borys Tarasyuk stated that Ukraine would not be exporting revolution.

During Alexander Lukashenko's inauguration (ceremony) as President of Belarus on 22 January 2011, Lukashenko vowed that Belarus would never have its own version of the Orange Revolution and Georgia's 2003 Rose Revolution. In the aftermath of the 2011 South Ossetian presidential election (in December 2011) and during the protests following the 2011 Russian elections (also in December 2011) the ambassador of South Ossetia to the Russian Federation Dmitry Medoyev and Russian prime minister Vladimir Putin and Putin's supporters named the Orange Revolution an infamous forewarning for their countries. Putin also claimed that the organisers of the Russian protests in December 2011 were former (Russian) advisors to Yushchenko during his presidency and were transferring the Orange Revolution to Russia. A 4 February 2012 rally in favor of Putin was named "the anti-Orange protest." In 2013, a Russian State Duma Oleg Nilov and former fellow Russian politician Sergey Glazyev referred to political adversaries as "different personalities in some sort of orange or bright shorts" and "diplomats and bureaucrats that appeared after the years of the 'orange' hysteria." (Note: During a January 2013 debate in the Russian State Duma on a bill criminalising gay "propaganda" in Russia the A Just Russia deputy Oleg Nilov referred to "different personalities in some sort of orange or bright shorts". Former fellow Russian politician Sergey Glazyev stated in August 2013 that "a whole generation of diplomats and bureaucrats has appeared after the years of the 'orange' hysteria, who are carrying out an anti-Russian agenda" "creates an effect that Ukraine doesn't want", namely Ukrainian integration into the European Union and not into the Customs Union of Belarus, Kazakhstan and Russia.) In 2016 the Russian newspaper Izvestia claimed that "in Central Asia, weak regimes are being attacked by extremists and 'Orange Revolutions.'" (Note: Writing about the 2016 US presidential election Izvestia claimed "If the war-like, Russia-hating Hillary Clinton wins the US election, a third front could open up in the Caucasus; money will pour in to support terrorists, just like it did during the two Chechen wars. There could even be a fourth front in Central Asia, where weak regimes are already being attacked by extremists and 'Orange Revolutions'.")

In Russian nationalist circles the Orange Revolution has been linked with fascism because, albeit marginally, Ukrainian nationalist extreme right-wing groups and Ukrainian Americans (including Viktor Yushchenko's wife, Kateryna Yushchenko, who was born in the United States) were involved in the demonstrations; Russian nationalist groups see both as branches of the same tree of fascism. The involvement of Ukrainian Americans led them to believe the Orange Revolution was steered by the CIA.

In a televised meeting with military bloggers on 13 June 2023, Russian president Vladimir Putin stated that the winner of the 2004 Ukrainian presidential election, Viktor Yushchenko had come to power with the help of a coup d'état, which "at least took place in a relatively peaceful way."

== See also ==
- Civil resistance
- Colour revolution
- Euromaidan
- Foreign electoral intervention
- Orange Revolution (film)
- Razom nas bahato
- Rise up, Ukraine!
- Rose Revolution
- Tulip Revolution
- Ukraine without Kuchma
