= Vasily Sitnikov =

Vasily Yakovlevich Sitnikov (Russian: Василий Яковлевич Ситников; August 19, 1915 – November 28, 1987) was a Russian painter.

He was a post-war Soviet Nonconformist Art of Russia, well known in Moscow artistic milieus. His work is in the collection of the New York Museum of Modern Art (MoMA), and the Zimmerli Art Museum at Rutgers University.

Sitnikov was born in Novo-Rakitino, Tambov Governorate in 1915. He lived in New York City until his death in New York 1987. In 2002 Andrei Zagdansky produced a feature-length documentary Vasya about the life and art of Vasily Sitnikov.
