= Andrei Zagdansky =

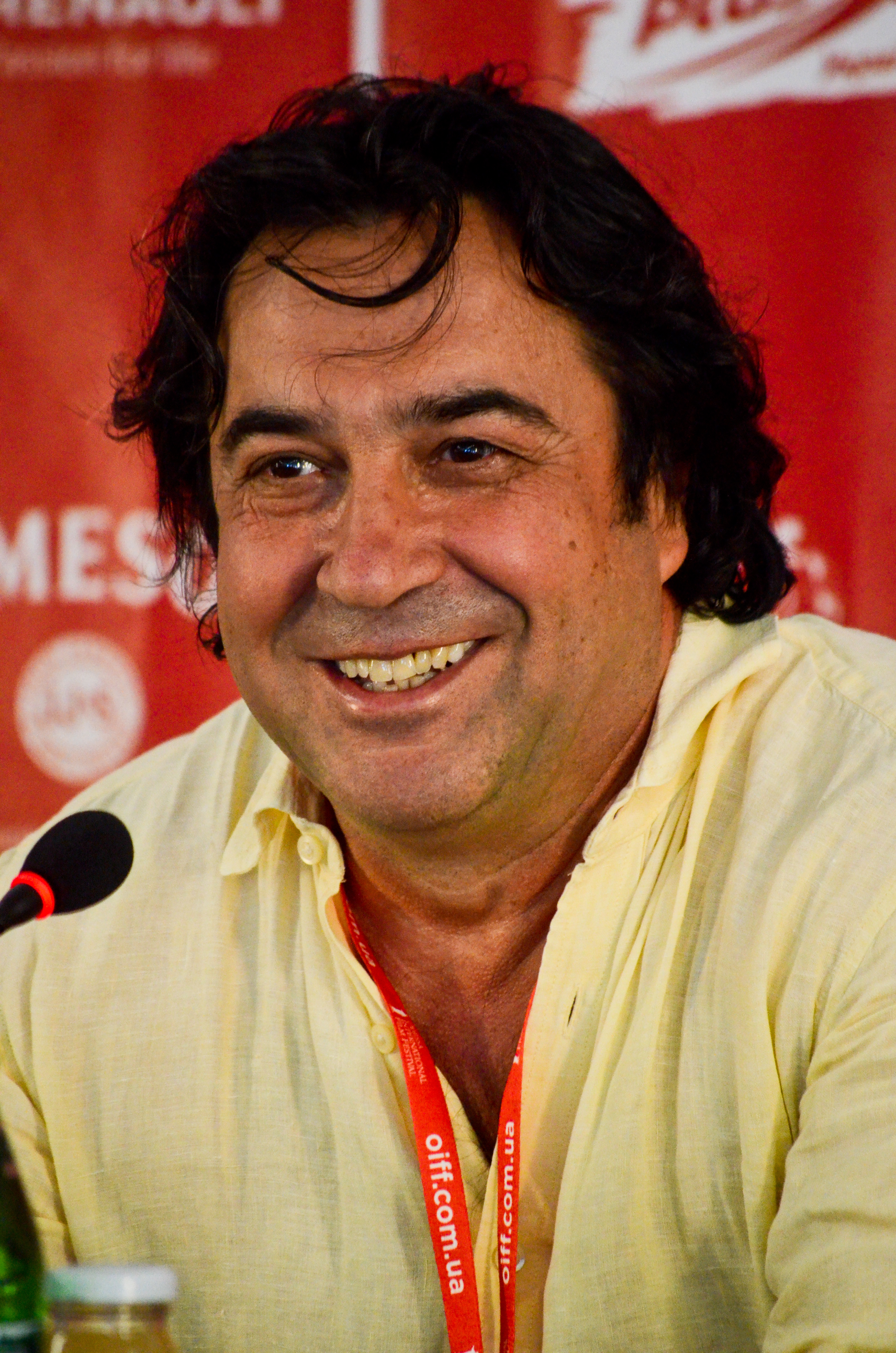
Andrei Zagdansky at the Odesa International Film Festival 2015

Andrei Zagdansky (born March 9, 1956) is an transnational independent documentary filmmaker and producer originally from USSR and Ukraine.

== Biography ==
Zagdansky attended Kiev State Institute of Theatrical Arts, graduating in 1979. He worked as a film director for Kievnauchfilm studio in Kyiv from 1981 through 1988, and at film studio Thursday from 1988 through 1992. In 1991, Zagdansky traveled to the United States at the invitation of the Film Society of Lincoln Center to present his Freudian film Interpretation of Dreams at the New Directors/New Films Festival at the Museum of Modern Art. Immigrating to the United States in 1992, he worked as a free-lance producer for the now defunct Russian-American Broadcasting Company from 1992 through 1999. He has also taught several film classes at New School University.

== Filmography as a director/producer ==
- 2023: Dudunya. The Art and Many Hats of Vladimir Radunsky
- 2021: National Museum
- 2017: Garik (TV film)
- 2018: Michail and Daniel
- 2014: Vagrich and the Black Square
- 2013: Trottoirs de Paris
- 2010: My Father Evgeni
- 2007: Orange Winter
- 2006: Konstantin and Mouse
- 2002: Vasya
- 2001: Six Days
- 1992: Two
- 1990: Interpretation of Dreams
- 1988: Registration
