= 2022 in Egypt =

- Decades: 2000s; 2010s; 2020s
- See also: Other events of 2022; List of years in Egypt

Events in the year 2022 in Egypt.

== Incumbents ==
| Photo | Post | Name |
|---|---|---|
| | President of Egypt | Abdel Fattah el-Sisi |
| | Prime Minister of Egypt | Moustafa Madbouly |

== Events ==
Ongoing – COVID-19 pandemic in Egypt

- 8 January – A traffic collision between two buses in the South Sinai Governorate kills 16 people and injures 18 others.
- 11 January – 2022 Cyprus earthquake
- 30 January – Ten members of the Sunni Islamist organization Muslim Brotherhood are sentenced to capital punishment by an Egyptian court for their involvement in a deadly attack against security personnel in 2015.
- 22 March – Five Ancient Egyptian tombs are discovered in Egypt.
- 28 March – Abraham Accords: The foreign ministers of Israel, Egypt, Morocco, Bahrain and the United Arab Emirates, as well as the United States Secretary of State, meet in Sde Boker, Israel, and agree to hold regular meetings about regional security and commit to further expanding economic and diplomatic cooperation.
- 13 April – Ten people are killed and 14 others are injured when a truck crashes into a tourist bus in Aswan Governorate.
- 14 April – Egypt's Minister of Agriculture El Sayed El Quseir announces that India has approved Egyptian imports of wheat due to the shortage caused by the Russian invasion of Ukraine.
- 30 April –
  - A natural gas pipeline is blown up in Bir al-Abd, North Sinai, Egypt, by suspected jihadist militants.
  - A tricycle falls into a man-made channel in Itay El Barud, Egypt. Eight children die and four people are rescued.
- 1 May – The Islamic State claims via the Al-Naba newspaper that Israel killed a senior jihadist commander in the Egyptian Sinai Peninsula.
- 7 May – Ten soldiers and one officer are killed during an attack at a checkpoint at a water pumping station in the Suez Canal.
- 8 May – 2022 El Qantara checkpoint attack
- 11 May – Five soldiers are killed and four others are injured during a shooting at a security post in North Sinai.
- 17 June – At least six people are killed by a building collapse in Cairo.
- 21 June –
  - Lebanon, Egypt and Syria sign an agreement to supply Egyptian gas to a power plant in northern Lebanon through Syria. However, the World Bank, which is financing the deal, must validate the agreement before it can take effect.
  - Egypt rejects two World Trade Organization (WTO) agreements which would have forced it to export domestically needed food to alleviate the global food crisis, citing proposals that it considers harmful to developing countries and also noting that 30 other WTO member states restrict food exports.
- 3 July – Two people are killed in a shark attack off the coast of Sahl Hasheesh, Egypt, on the Red Sea.
- 5 July – Two Egyptian UN peacekeepers are killed and five others are injured when their vehicle hits a mine in northern Mali.
- 7 July – Nine people are killed and 43 others injured when a bus from Sudan crashes while travelling to Aswan.
- 19 July – At least 23 people are killed and 30 others are injured in a truck and bus crash in Minya.
- 3 August – Seventeen people are killed and four others are injured after a minibus collides with a truck in Juhaynah, Sohag Governorate.
- 12 August – Nine people are killed and 18 others injured after a microbus overturn in Minya.
- 14 August – Giza church fire: At least 41 people are killed and 45 others are injured in a fire at the Saint Mercurius Coptic Orthodox church in Giza, Egypt.
- 16 August – Hamza Adel Al-Zamili, a leader of the Islamic State – Sinai Province and mastermind of the 2017 Sinai mosque attack, is killed by Egyptian soldiers during an operation. Nine other militants are also killed and three arrested.
- 29 August – A dinghy carrying 27 Egyptians en route to Italy capsizes off the coast of Libya, killing at least two people and leaving nineteen others missing in the Mediterranean Sea.
- 3 September – Twenty-seven ancient artifacts housed in the Metropolitan Museum of Art in New York City, United States, are seized by federal investigators under the suspicion that they were looted. The artifacts will be repatriated to Italy and Egypt next week.
- 7 September – Egypt confirms its first case of monkeypox.
- 25 October – Ten people are killed and nine others are injured when a truck and a minibus collide in Dakahlia Governorate.
- 6–18 November COP 27
- 8 November – Three people are killed after a building collapses in Cairo.
- 12 November – A bus falls into a canal in the Nile River Delta in Dakahlia Governorate, Egypt, killing 21 people.
- 15 November – Fourteen people are killed after a minibus and a truck collide in Abu Minqar, New Valley Governorate.
- 20 November – Egyptian president Abdel Fattah el-Sisi and Turkish president Recep Tayyip Erdoğan meet for the first time following their opposing involvements in the 2013 Egyptian coup d'état.
- 8 December – Egypt joins the BRICS-led New Development Bank after the Egyptian government ratifies its accession into the multilateral development bank.

== Sports ==
- 5 March – 28 May: 2022 BAL season
- 9 – 19 April: 2022 BAL Nile Conference
- 17 – 10 June: 2022 African Rhythmic Gymnastics Championships
- 8 – 11 July: 2022 African Artistic Gymnastics Championships
- 25 October 2021 – 30 August 2022: 2021–22 Egyptian Premier League
- 18 October 2022 – June 2023: 2022–23 Egyptian Premier League
- 28 – 30 October: 2022 African Weightlifting Championships
- 10 – 15 December:
  - 2022 Men's Africa Hockey5s World Cup Qualifier
  - 2022 Women's Africa Hockey5s World Cup Qualifier

== Deaths ==
- 9 January –
  - Wael el-Ebrashy, 58, journalist and television presenter, complications from COVID-19.
  - Tahani al-Gebali, 71, judge, vice president of the supreme constitutional court (2003–2012), COVID-19.
- 31 January – Mohamed Abdul Salam Mahgoub, 86, Egyptian politician, governor of Alexandria (1997–2006) and Ismailia Governorate (1994–1997).
- 6 February – Sayyid Al-Qemany, 74, writer and philosopher.
- 15 February – Youhanna Golta, 85, Coptic Catholic hierarch, auxiliary and curial bishop of Alexandria (1986–2020).
- 16 February – Saeed Marie, 67, judge, president of the Supreme Constitutional Court (since 2019).
- 17 February – Ahmed Mostafa, 81, footballer (1964 Olympic team, Zamalek, national team).
- 13 March – Anissa Hassouna, 69, politician, MP (2016–2020), cancer.
- 20 March – Zaki Fatin Abdel Wahab, 61, actor (The Sixth Day, Alexandria Again and Forever, Mercedes) and film director.
- 23 March – Abd-Al-Minaam Khaleel, 100, military officer.
- 28 March – Antonios Naguib, 87, Coptic Catholic cardinal, patriarch of Alexandria (2006–2013).
- 14 May – Ramez Elmasri, 71, Egyptian-American computer scientist.
- 15 May – Salah Montaser, 88, writer and journalist.
- 27 May – Fayez Sarofim, 93, Egyptian-American sports team owner (Houston Texans).
- 8 June – Ranan Lurie, 90, Egyptian-born Israeli-American political cartoonist and journalist.
- 31 July – Ayman al-Zawahiri, 71, Islamic militant, emir of the Egyptian Islamic Jihad (1991–1998), emir (since 2011) and deputy emir (1988–2011) of al-Qaeda, airstrike.
- 6 August – Hussein Abdo Hamza, 72, jurist, president of the State Lawsuits Authority (2017–2019).
- 13 August – Claude Salhani, 70, photographer.
- 10 September – Henri Stierlin, 94, Egyptian-born Swiss journalist and writer.
- 22 September – Hesham Selim, 64, actor, cancer.
- 26 September – Yusuf al-Qaradawi, 96, Islamic scholar (The Lawful and the Prohibited in Islam), chairman of IUMS (since 2004).
- 27 October – Bahaa Taher, 87, novelist.
- 4 November – Ibrahim Munir, 85, Islamic activist.
- 2 December – Assem Allam, 83, Egyptian-British football executive, chairman of Hull City (2010–2022), cancer.
- 4 December – Mofeed Fawzy, 89, journalist (Rose al-Yūsuf) and television presenter (Al Qahera Al Youm).
- 10 December – Salah Fadl, 84, writer and translator.

== See also ==
- COVID-19 pandemic in Africa
- 2020s
- African Union
- Arab League
- Terrorism in Egypt
- Grand Ethiopian Renaissance Dam
- African Continental Free Trade Area
- Common Market for Eastern and Southern Africa
