= 2026 in Egypt =

- Decades: 2000s; 2010s; 2020s
- See also: Other events of 2026; List of years in Egypt

Events in the year 2026 in Egypt.

== Incumbents ==
Photo	Post	Name
	President of Egypt	Abdel Fattah el-Sisi
	Prime Minister of Egypt	Moustafa Madbouly

== Events ==
=== January ===
- 13 January – The United States designates the Egyptian chapter of the Muslim Brotherhood as a terrorist organization, citing its support for Hamas.
- 17 January – Egypt finishes fourth at the 2025 Africa Cup of Nations in Morocco, after losing to Nigeria 4-2 on penalties at Stade Mohammed V in Casablanca.

=== February ===
- 2 February –
  - The local government begins allowing sick and wounded Palestinians to enter through the Rafah Border Crossing for medical treatment; after Israel partially reopened the border for the first time since May 2024.
  - Multiple Turkish-made Bayraktar Akinci unmanned combat aerial vehicles are deployed by the Egyptian Armed Forces at the East Oweinat airstrip, near the Egypt–Sudan border
- 6 February – The Netherlands returns a 3,500-year-old Ancient Egyptian sculpture to Egypt after a Dutch investigation confirmed it had been looted and unlawfully removed during the 2011 Egyptian revolution.
- 11 February – The House of Representatives appoints General Ashraf Mansour as the new defence minister, replacing General Abdel Mageed Saqr as part of a limited cabinet reshuffle.
- 19 February — Two trucks collide near Port Said, killing 18 people and injuring three others.
- 28 February – The Rafah Border Crossing between the Gaza Strip and Egypt is closed by Israel, citing "security reasons" amid the start of the 2026 Iran war.

=== March ===
- 10 March — The Ministry of Petroleum and Mineral Resources announces a 30% increase in the price of vehicle fuel amid shortages caused by the 2026 Iran war.
- 12 March — The government imposes limits on the price of bread amid rising fuel prices.
- 19 March — The Rafah Border Crossing between Egypt and the Gaza Strip reopens for limited movement, allowing a restricted number of Palestinian patients to enter Egypt for medical treatment and some people to return to Gaza under coordinated security procedures, following its closure as a security measure amid the 2026 Iran war.
- 29 March – Multiple Arab foreign ministers unanimously agree to nominate Nabil Fahmi as Secretary-General of the Arab League, to succeed Ahmed Aboul Gheit at the end of his term in June 2026.

=== May ===
- 1 May –
  - Commercial services along the Nile between Egypt and Sudan resume for the first time since 2020.
  - China lifts tariffs on imports from Egypt until 2028.
- 12 May – Ismaily SC are relegated from the Egyptian Premier League after losing 2-1 to Wadi Degla SC, marking their first relegation since 1958 and only the second relegation in the club’s history.
- 18 May – Nine people, including the gunman, are killed in a mass shooting in Asyut Governorate.

=== June ===
- 11 June–19 July – Egypt participates at the 2026 FIFA World Cup.
- 22 June – Security forces arrest 223 people, including 136 foreign nationals, along the border with Sudan as part of an operation against illegal gold mining and smuggling.
- 30 June – Nine children are killed when a motorized tricycle plunges into a canal in Abu Tig, Asyut Governorate.

=== July ===
- 4 July – The Ministry of Tourism and Antiquities announces the discovery of a well-preserved fourth-century Byzantine settlement at the Dakhla Oasis in the Western Desert.
- 9 July – Five people are killed in Giza following an apartment fire caused by a gas leak.
- 15 July – Authorities detain some 60 people for opposing President Sisi on a Discord server.
- 19 July – An Egyptian channel interviews Israeli journalist and Haaretz columnist Gideon Levy, breaking a rule that requires Egyptian media to boycott and not interview Israeli journalists.
- 24 July – The United States imposes a 12.5% tariff on Egypt, citing the presence of alleged forced labor in the supply chain.
- 29 July – A drone attack damages two tankers at Damietta Port, including the US-owned floating storage tanker Energos Winter.

=== August ===
- 3 August – A magnitude 5.6 earthquake hits Ismailia Governorate, killing one person and injuring two others.
- 11 August – Fifteen people are killed ‌and 32 others are injured when a pickup truck carrying workers rolls over in Ismailia Governorate.

=== September ===
- 2 September –
  - At least 22 people are killed and 28 others are wounded in a bus accident along the Dahab-Nuweiba road in South Sinai Governorate.
  - Egypt and China sign an agreement to begin the third stage of the Egyptian-Chinese industrial zone on the Suez Canal.
- 5 September – Twelve people, including TV presenter Sarah Khalifa, are sentenced to death on charges of drug trafficking.
- 21 September – Amina Orfi becomes the youngest women's squash world number one at 19 years and two months old after winning the Qatar Classic, breaking the previous record set by Susan Devoy, who was 20 years and two months old in 1984.
- 28 September – A court in Rome sentences three Egyptian security officials to ten years imprisonment for abducting Giulio Regeni.

=== October ===
- 1 October – Authorities detain six journalists from fact-checking and investigative media outlet Matsaddash, alleging that they spread misinformation for the banned Muslim Brotherhood, a claim denied by the publication.
- 17 October – President Sisi announces that he will step down in 2030.
- 20 October – A bus collides with a truck near Cairo, killing 12 people and injuring 30 others.
- 26 October – Parliament authorizes President Sisi to use "all necessary measures" to help Saudi Arabia defend itself against the Houthis.
- 27 October –
  - Israel announces that it detained an Egyptian national who violated the Egypt–Israel barrier overnight.
  - A court detains and fines the editor of the independent media outlet Mada Masr and orders its shutdown.
- 31 October – A minibus and a truck crash near 6th of October City, killing 10 people and injuring 24 others.

=== November ===
- 5 November – Two Egyptian Army officers are killed during a military crackdown on illegal gold mining along the Egypt–Sudan border.
- 7 November – Egypt reopens its embassy in Tripoli, Libya after a 12-year closure, citing an improvement in relations with the western-based Government of National Unity.
- 8 November – At least seven people are killed and at least 125 others wounded when two trains collide in El Ayyat.
- 17 November – Israel announces that it foiled an overnight attempt to smuggle Kalashnikov rifles near Nitzana along the Egyptian border.

== Deaths ==
- 7 January – Murad Wahba, 99, writer, philosopher and academic.
- 15 February – Moufed Mahmoud Shehab, 90, politician.
- 4 March – Ahmed Ibrahim Darwish, 83, writer and poet.
- 13 March – Fatma Sarhan, 97–98, singer and actress.
- 19 June – Youssef Afifi, 99, army officer, governor of Red Sea Governorate (1981–1991) and Giza Governorate (1991–1993).
- 9 August – Diab Al-Louh 68, Palestinian ambassador to Egypt (since 2017).
- 14 October – Gamal Nkrumah, 68, Ghanaian-born journalist (Al-Ahram Weekly).
