= 2025 in Egypt =

- Decades: 2000s; 2010s; 2020s
- See also: Other events of 2025; List of years in Egypt

Events in the year 2025 in Egypt.

== Incumbents ==
Photo	Post	Name
	President of Egypt	Abdel Fattah el-Sisi
	Prime Minister of Egypt	Moustafa Madbouly

== Events ==
=== February ===
- February 12 – The American aircraft carrier USS Harry S. Truman collides with a Turkish merchant vessel near Port Said. No injuries are reported.
- February 17 – Ten people are killed in a building collapse in Kerdasa, Giza Governorate.
- February 18 – Archaeologists announce the discovery of the tomb of the ancient Egyptian Pharaoh Thutmose II in Thebes, in what is the first ancient Egyptian royal tomb to be discovered since that of Tutankhamun in 1922.

=== March ===
- March 3 – A minibus and a truck collide head-on in Asyut, killing 13 people.
- March 13 – A train collides with a minibus at an unauthorized crossing in Ismailia Governorate, killing eight people.
- March 27 – A tourist submarine sinks in the Red Sea off the coast of Hurghada, killing six Russian nationals.

=== April ===
- April 17 – National Police conduct an operation and arrest dozens of individuals accused of drug trafficking. Among those detained by the police is television presenter and businesswoman Sarah Khalifa, who is sentenced to death in September 2026 after being convicted on all charges.

=== May ===
- May 19 – An unspecified training aircraft of the Egyptian Air Force crashes in an undisclosed location, killing its entire crew.

=== June ===
- June 14 – Pro-Palestinian demonstrators and Global March to Gaza supporters are stopped by Egyptian border patrol and law enforcement, leading to violent clashes that same day.
- 27 June – A minibus collides with a truck in Ashmoun, Monufia, killing 19 people and injuring three others.

=== July ===
- 1 July – An oil-drilling vessel capsizes in the Gulf of Suez off the coast of Ras Ghareb, killing four people and leaving three others missing.
- 7 July – Ramses Exchange fire. Four people are killed and at least 27 others are injured in a fire at the Ramses Exchange operated by Telecom Egypt in Cairo that also causes a reduction of telecommunications connectivity by 62% and a suspension of trading on the Cairo stock exchange the next day.
- 20 July – Three people, including two suspected members of the Hasm Movement, are killed in a police raid in Giza.

=== August ===
- 2 August – Mariam Ayman ("Suzy El Ordonia"), a 19-year-old TikTok influencer with 9.4 million followers, is arrested in Cairo on charges of distributing indecent content and laundering 15 million Egyptian pounds.
- 4–5 August – 2025 Egyptian Senate election.
- 8 August – 2025 IHF Men's U19 Handball World Championship
- 30 August – A passenger train traveling from Matrouh Governorate to Cairo derails in the west of the country, killing three people and injuring 94 others.

=== September ===
- 16 September – Authorities announce the theft of a 3,000-year-old gold bracelet dating from the reign of King Amenemope from the Egyptian Museum in Cairo. Four people, including a museum employee, are subsequently arrested, and the artefact is later reported to have been sold and melted down.
- 22 September – President el-Sisi issues pardons to six people, including political activist Alaa Abd El-Fattah.
- 26 September – A building partially collapses following a fire in El Mahalla El Kubra, killing eight people.

=== October ===
- 5 October – The Supreme Council of Antiquities announces the theft of a 4,000-year-old limestone pharaonic painting from tomb of Khentika in Saqqara.
- 8 October – Egypt qualifies for the 2026 FIFA World Cup after defeating Djibouti 3–0 at the 2026 FIFA World Cup qualification.
- 11 October – A car crash kills three Qatari Amiri Diwan employees and injures two others while they were heading to Sharm El Sheikh.
- 13 October – The 2025 Gaza peace summit is held in Sharm El Sheikh, with over 20 national leaders in attendance.

=== November ===
- 1 November – The Grand Egyptian Museum is officially opened to the public.
- 6 November – Egypt's Khaled El-Enany is elected as Director-General of the United Nations Educational, Scientific and Cultural Organization (UNESCO), making him the first person from the Arab World to assume the position.
- 10–11 November – 2025 Egyptian parliamentary election (first round)
- 24 November – 2025 Egyptian parliamentary election (second round)

=== December ===
- 3–4 December – 2025 Egyptian parliamentary election (partial re-run)
- 11 December – Koshary is recognized as intangible cultural heritage by UNESCO.
- 25 December – The Ministry of Youth and Sports appoints an interim committee to oversee the national swimming federation in coordination with World Aquatics, following the death of a 12-year-old swimmer earlier in the month.
- 31 December – The Giza Criminal Court sentences footballer Ramadan Sobhi to one year in prison with labour in an academic fraud case related to falsified documents and exam impersonation at a private institute in Giza Governorate.

== Deaths ==
- 9 January – Laila Rustom, 87, TV presenter.
- 30 March – Pachomius, 89, Coptic Orthodox prelate, metropolitan bishop of Beheira (since 1971).
- 12 April – Ibrahim Shika, 28, footballer (Zamalek).
- 3 June – Samiha Ayoub, 93, actress.
- 5 June – Hoda Al-Ajimi, 88, radio presenter.
- 13 August – Sonallah Ibrahim, 88, novelist (Zaat, Sharaf, The Stealth).
- 29 December – Abu Walid al-Masri, 80, journalist (Al Jazeera) and Islamist militant (Afghan Arabs).
