= Internet in Egypt =

Internet in Egypt is accessible to the majority of the population in Egypt, whether via smartphones, internet cafes, or home connections. Broadband Internet access via VDSL and FTTH is widely available.

Under the rule of Hosni Mubarak, Internet censorship and surveillance were severe, culminating in a brief total shutdown of the Internet in Egypt during the 2011 Revolution. Although Internet access was soon quickly restored following Mubarak's order that year, government censorship and surveillance later increased years later following the overthrow in 2013 of Mohamed Morsi, leading the American NGO Freedom House to downgrade Egypt's Internet freedom rating from "partly free" in 2011 to "not free" in 2015, which the country has retained in subsequent reports, including the most recent in 2025. Under the presidency of Morsi's successor Abdel Fattah el-Sisi, the ruling government has ramped up online censorship in Egypt. The government heavily censors online news websites, which has prompted the closure of many independent news outlets in Egypt.

== Penetration ==
Egypt's internet penetration rate grew from less than one percent in 2000, to 5% in 2004, 24% in 2009, 54.6% in 2014, 71.9% in 2022, and 81.9% in early 2025. Egypt has continued to grow internet penetration by investing in the information and communications technology sector, spending E£9.8 billion in 2008 which grew to E£13.5 billion in 2011.

As part of the Egyptian government's ambitious program to expand access to information technology, the Ministry of Communications and Information Technology (MCIT), National Telecommunications Regulatory Authority (NTRA), Egyptian National Post Organization, and the Computer and Software Department at the Federation of Egyptian Chambers of Commerce signed an agreement to spread personal computers for every home in August 2008. The agreement is the second phase of a 2002 initiative and is part of the MCIT's strategy of increasing computer use throughout Egypt, focusing on socio-economically disadvantaged communities. The initiative includes offering discounts on computers and 512 kbit/s ADSL subscriptions for three years.

Almost a million Egyptian households have broadband access due to sharing VDSL lines. Of these, 63.4% share the connection with their neighbors; 81.9% of households that share lines share them with more than three other households. Egypt had more than 400,000 ADSL lines by the end of 2007, 75% of which were residential. More than one-fourth of Egyptian Internet users visit Internet cafés to get online.

== Broadband access ==
Broadband Internet access was introduced commercially to Egypt in 2000 as an asymmetric digital subscriber line. The service was offered in select central offices in big cities such as Cairo and Alexandria and gradually spread to cover more governorates of Egypt. There are numerous (220 according to regulatory authority numbers) Internet service providers in Egypt offering an ADSL service. Seven companies own the infrastructure, known as class A ISPs: (Egynet, LINKdotNET, TE Data, NOL, Vodafone data, Noor communication and Yalla). Etisalat Egypt bought both NileOnli and Egynet to expand their Internet presence. They sell to class B ISPs which, in turn, one-fourth sell to the rest of the 208 ISPs.

Broadband connections in Egypt vary in quality. Quality depends on the distance from the central loop office, the presence of ISP in that local loop, and the quality of the copper telephone line carrying the broadband connection. Internationally, Egypt is currently served with three international submarine cables: namely, FLAG, SEA-ME-WE 3 and SEA-ME-WE 4. However, following the mass information blackout of early 2008, with the announcement of Telecom Egypt owned cable TE North and Orascom telecom owned MENA, several other projects are planned to improve the resilience of the international broadband to make sure users internet connect do not go faulty.

== Internet exchange points ==
Egypt has two Internet exchange points: Cairo Regional Internet Exchange (CR-IX) and Middle East Internet Exchange, the former carrying international, as well as domestic, services. Reports related to the 2011 Internet shutdown in Egypt refer to the "Ramses Exchange" as the location where the shutdown was affected. The Ramses Exchange is the main "wire center" for Telecom Egypt, carrying not only municipal telecommunications traffic, but also serving as the main point of entry for international submarine fiber-optic circuits, back-hauled from landing stations near Alexandria. The Ramses Exchange is also the location of the CR-IX, the largest Internet exchange in North Africa or the Middle East.

== Fair usage policy debate ==
=== Ministerial statement ===
The Minister of Communications and Information Technology, Tarek Kamel, said in the July 2007 news that the ADSL would be turned from Unlimited to Limited with a Quota at a starting price of E£45 for the 256k/64k and a 2 GB limit for the download and so on. The widespread use of local line sharing limited ISPs' subscribers' fiber-optic and increased the network's traffic burden. However, almost all the ADSL users, especially the students and users of unlimited ADSL, refused the offer. Most users had concluded that if this plan were to be imposed, they would cancel their subscriptions because they wanted the Internet to be unlimited.

The plan was to start the limited ADSL Packages on 1 September 2007. However, it turned out that Tarek Kamel was to aim specific offerings at different price ranges for other individuals unable to subscribe to an unlimited package. As such, the unlimited packages remained as is and are available through all major ISPs with no changes in price, while the limited ADSL price ranges are now discounted, with the existing unlimited policies having no fair usage policy, except for ADSL2+.

=== Introduction of ADSL2+ ===
In April 2008, ADSL2+ was introduced in Egypt at speeds up to 24 mbit. Now, most ISPs have capped all the unlimited ADSL offerings to a quota of between 100 GB and 200 GB per month, calling it a Fair usage policy. All speeds from 1 mbit/256k up to 24 mbit are capped to up to 200 GB per month. ISPs stated that the 200 GB quota was huge, and users could download up to 60 large movies, 10,000 large songs, browse endlessly and send up to 2 million emails a month. Most users are divided upon this cap, especially heavy P2P users. Going above the monthly quota would result in throttling down to unworkable speeds starting from at the highest 512 kbit/s to potentially far lower depending on the service provider and region for the rest of the month.

=== Introduction of VDSL2 ===
On 21 May 2015, it introduced the VDSL service with speeds of up to 100 Mbit/s. This has been applied in the area of Madinaty as the first step to experiencing this new technology, which intends to popularize the country

=== Alternative offer ===
There is an alternative offer from 512k to 24 mbit, ranging from 2 GB a month to 200 GB a month as a fair usage coverage with reduced prices to encourage low-range users to uptake of broadband.

=== Confusion about capping ===
Most ISPs, even though they are capped to 40-150 GB a month, still claim the offers as unlimited. Also, companies use vague and inconclusive responses about the Fair Usage Policy and its implementation of different packages. The ISP's websites got the FUP in English and placed in hard-to-navigate places, plus most of the technical support and representatives are denying that any FUP is in place, which is felt by the end-user to be in place, possibly in fear of customers canceling their subscriptions at the thought of being capped.

== Performance improvement ==
The service improved dramatically between 2007 and late 2009 due to the heavy investment of all parties involved in the provision of Internet infrastructure. According to NTRA, the total international bandwidth at the end of 2009 was 90458 MB and the number of ports was 970557. This is a dramatic increase from the first quarter of 2009 of only 16,995 MB. This means that the bandwidth made available to customers with telecommunication infrastructure had greatly increased.

== 2008 marine cable damage ==
On 30 January 2008, Internet service in Egypt and the Middle East was affected by the breakage of two marine cables, FLAG and SMW4, which connect Egypt to the worldwide Internet. TE Data users were not disconnected from the Internet since the company had a third international gateway to the Internet, namely SMW3; however, they suffered from reduced bandwidth until the issue was resolved. The local National Telecom Authority issued a decision for all ISPs to offer a free-of-charge month to all clients to compensate for the reduced quality of service during the outage.

== Censorship ==
Although the Internet in Egypt was not directly censored under the regime of President Hosni Mubarak, his regime kept watch on the most critical bloggers and regularly arrested them. Censorship at a technological level during that time was mainly in the form of optional filters offered by Egyptian ISPs to block pornography; TE Data offers Internet services with content controls that filter "all of the Internet's indecent content that might affect your children."

In August 2009 the OpenNet Initiative reported finding no evidence of Internet filtering in Egypt in any of the four areas it monitors (political, social, conflict/security, and Internet tools). Using data and information gathered during 2010, the status of Internet freedom in Egypt was classified as "Partly Free" in Freedom on the Net 2011 by Freedom House.

The outcome of the 2011 Egyptian revolution was initially interpreted as a chance to establish greater freedom of expression in Egypt, especially online. Reflecting these dramatic changes and opportunities in Egypt, in March 2011 Reporters Without Borders moved Egypt from its "Internet Enemies" list to its countries "under surveillance" list.

In March 2012, Reporters Without Borders reported:

The first anniversary of Egypt's revolution was celebrated amid uncertainty and tension between a contested military power, a protest movement attempting to get its second wind, and triumphant Islamists. As a result, bloggers and netizens critical of the Army have been harassed, threatened, and sometimes arrested.

The Supreme Council of the Armed Forces (SCAF), which has been leading the country since February 2011, has not only perpetuated Hosni Mubarak's ways of controlling information but has strengthened them. As a result, numerous journalists and bloggers seeking to expose the abuses committed during the pro-democratic uprising by some aspects of the Army or the military police have been prosecuted before military courts and sometimes jailed for several months.

=== Censorship prior to 2011 ===
In 2005, Egyptian authorities continued to both encourage and place restrictions on Internet use. For example, Egypt's Ministry of Interior ordered Internet café managers and owners to record their customers' names and ID numbers in February. It threatened to close the cafés if they refused to comply. The Cairo-based Arabic Network condemned this action for Human Rights Information, which described it as "a gross violation of the right to privacy." In August 2008, authorities increased the level of surveillance by demanding that Internet café customers provide their names, email addresses, and phone numbers to receive a text message on their smartphones containing a PIN that they can use to access the Internet.

As the Egyptian blogosphere continued to grow, so did the Egyptian government's crackdown on bloggers and Internet users. For example, blogger Abdel Kareem Nabil Suleiman Amer ("Kareem Amer") was sentenced in February 2007 to four years in prison for "incitement to hatred of Islam" on his blog and for insulting the president. He has become the symbol of online repression for the country's bloggers. Other Egyptian bloggers have also been arrested for online activities, and some have been sentenced to prison. One example is Mohamed Refaat, editor of the blog Matabbat (matabbat.blogspot.com), who was arrested in August 2008 under the state emergency law. He was charged with "offending the state institutions, destabilizing public security, and inciting others to demonstrate and strike via the Internet."

In a landmark 2007 legal case, an administrative court rejected a lawsuit brought by a judge calling for the banning of 49 websites in Egypt. The court emphasized its support for freedom of expression as long as such websites do not harm the beliefs or public order. However, in May 2009, a Cairo court ruled that the Egyptian government must ban access to pornographic websites because they are deemed offensive to religion and society's values. The suit was filed by a lawyer who pointed out an Egyptian man and his wife who were sentenced to prison for starting a swingers club via the Internet as an example of "the dangers posed by such offensive Web sites." It remains to be seen whether the authorities will enforce this court order.

Egypt has witnessed an increase in the use of Facebook for social activism, which alerted the Egyptian government to the potential force of the site. As a result, there were rumors that it might be blocked, especially after a group of activists managed to recruit supporters using Facebook for the 2008 Egyptian general strike protesting against rising food prices and President Hosni Mubarak's government.

On 28 March 2011, military officers arrested the 25-year-old blogger Maikel Nabil at his home in Cairo. The military prosecutor charged him with "insulting the military establishment" and "spreading false information" for blogs criticizing the Army's role during anti-government protests. On 10 April, a military court sentenced Nabil to three years in prison, in what Human Rights Watch called a serious setback to freedom of expression in post-Mubarak Egypt. Not only was the sentence severe, but it was imposed on a civilian by a military tribunal after an unfair trial. Along with close to 2,000 other detainees, he was granted a pardon and released on 24 January 2012, having spent ten months behind bars. Immediately after his release, he once more began to challenge the legitimacy of the armed forces and criticize their record on the eve of the first anniversary of Egypt's revolution.

Another online activist who continued to challenge Egypt's censorship policies was Khaled Saeed, a young Alexandrian man who was beaten to death by police in June 2010 for posting a video on the Internet that exposed police corruption. His death inspired the creation of the Facebook page We are All Khaled Saeed, which became a mobilizing and organizing online space. Other online activists were arrested and unjustly detained—including Wael Ghonim, the founder and moderator of the We are All Khaled Saeed Facebook page.

=== Foreign assistance in surveillance ===
American company Narus, a subsidiary of Boeing Corporation, sold the Mubarak government surveillance equipment that helped identify dissidents during the 2011 revolution.

=== 2011 Internet shutdown ===
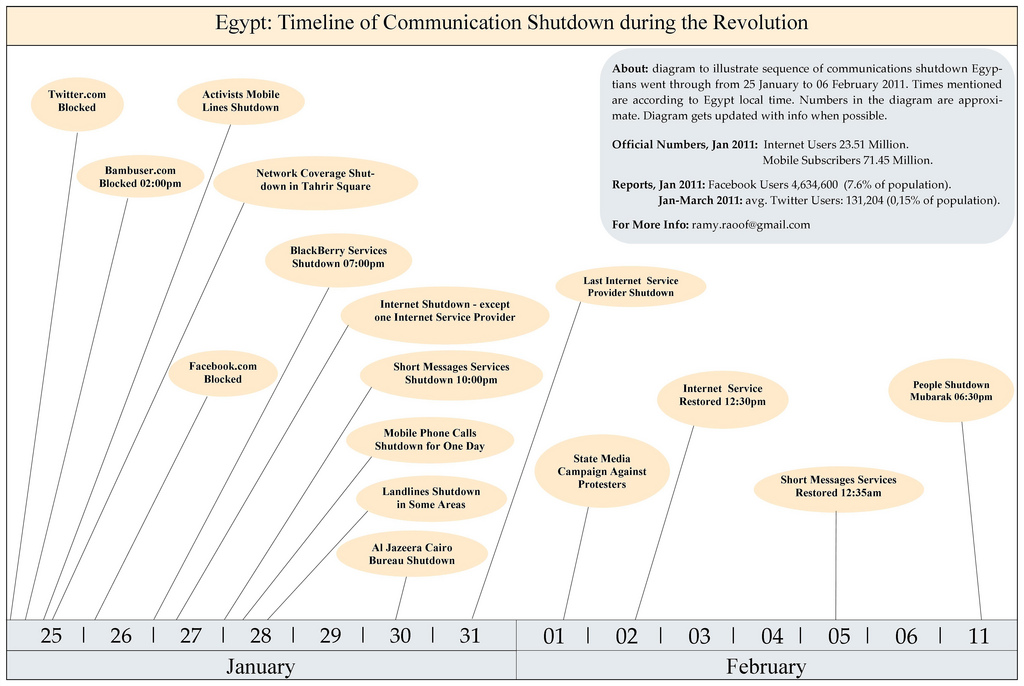
Diagram to illustrate a sequence of communications shutdown Egyptians went through from 25 January to 6 February 2011. The times mentioned are according to Egypt's local time. The numbers in the diagram are approximate. The last update of the diagram October 2011.

The 2011 Egyptian protests began on 25 January 2011. As a result, on the 25th and 26 January, the Egyptian government blocked Twitter in Egypt and later Facebook was blocked as well.

On 27 January, various reports claimed that access to the Internet in the entire country had been shut down. The authorities responsible achieved this by shutting down the country's official Domain Name System, in an attempt to stop mobilization for anti-government protests. Later reports stated that almost all BGP announcements out of the country had been withdrawn, almost completely disconnecting the country from the global Internet, with only a single major provider, Noor Data Networks, remained up. And though Noor continued to operate for several days, its routes started to be withdrawn at 20:46 UTC on 31 January.

It was later reported that the five major Egyptian service providers—Telecom Egypt, Vodafone Egypt/Raya, Link Egypt, Etisalat Misr, and Internet Egypt—all went dark one after the other between 22:12 and 22:25 UTC (12:12–12:25 am. Friday 28 January Cairo time). As a result, approximately 93% of all Egyptian networks were unreachable by late afternoon. The shutdown happened within the space of a few tens of minutes, not instantaneously, which was interpreted as companies receiving phone calls one at a time, ordering them to shut down access, rather than an automated system taking all providers down at once.

Analysis by BGPMon showed that only 26 BGP routes of the 2903 registered routes to Egyptian networks remained active after the blackout was first noticed; thus, an estimated 88% of the whole Egyptian network was disconnected. RIPE NCC has two graphs of routing activity from Egypt, announcements/withdrawals and available prefixes, including a snapshot of activity during the shutdown.

Shortly after the Internet shutdown, engineers at Google, Twitter, and SayNow, a voice-messaging startup company acquired by Google in January, announced the Speak To Tweet service. Google stated in its official blog that the goal of the service was to assist Egyptian protesters in staying connected during the Internet shutdown. Users could phone in a tweet by leaving a voicemail and use the Twitter hashtag #Egypt. These tweets can be accessed without an Internet connection by dialing the same designated phone numbers. Those with Internet access can listen to the tweets by visiting twitter.com/speak2tweet.

In 2011, the Egyptian government demanded that Egyptian ISPs shut down their networks in the act of the "State against the Internet." As a result, French Data Network (FDN) provided free (zero-cost) dial-up access to Egyptians with a landline (analogue) international telephone access. FDN provided the service as a matter of principle to "contribute to the freedom of expression of the Egyptian people and allow them to keep a connection with the rest of the world."

Following the shutdown of the Internet in Egypt, Barack Obama, then President of the United States of America, published a statement calling for an end to the Internet ban:

The people of Egypt have universal rights. That includes the right to peaceful assembly and association, free speech, and the ability to determine their destiny. These are human rights, and the United States will stand up for them everywhere. I also call upon the Egyptian government to reverse the actions they've taken to interfere with access to the Internet, cellphone service, and social networks that do so much to connect people in the 21st century.

On 2 February, connectivity was reestablished by the four main Egyptian service providers. A week later, the heavy filtering that occurred at the height of the revolution had ended and bloggers and online activists who had been arrested were released.

=== Increased censorship and surveillance in the post-Morsi era ===
The Egyptian government intensified efforts in the years after the overthrow of Morsi to bolster its ability to intercept and monitor messages and data sent over the Internet, affecting with the digital security tools that facilitate secure communication channels. In many cases, these disturbances have completely or partially disabled the encryption services widely used by commercial and civil services and individuals to secure their data flow.

Awareness of the interference did not gain traction among the broader public until December 2016, when users suddenly discovered that Signal, the messaging and voice calling application supported by Open Whisper Systems' encryption protocol, had stopped working in Egypt. Digital security experts contend that they had faced similar problems months before, which led some information security companies to halt the collection of monthly fees pending a resolution.

Indications that the Egyptian government has made attempts to acquire technology that would allow it greater surveillance of communication networks have surfaced several times. The most notable revelation came from a July 2015 data breach when an unknown individual hacked the computer system of a Milan-based information technology company HackingTeam. Around 400 gigabytes of data – including emails, contracts, bills, and budgets involving the company and Egyptian security and intelligence authorities – were accessible to the public.

In concert with other evidence, the leaked documents show that Egyptian authorities were attempting to acquire technology that would allow them to collect information on specific users of interest through directed surveillance.

The first problem that companies and specialists faced that indicated Egyptian security agencies may be targeting the entire network's infrastructure arose in August 2016. Technicians noted that access to Secure Shell (SSH) – a protocol to provide secure communication channels across unsecured public networks and provided by different online services providers – had been obstructed. SSH protocol provided by US company DigitalOcean is used daily to manage millions of communication processes over the Internet.

In response to the obstruction, DigitalOcean's users and clients began to contact the company. In response to a client's inquiry, which was obtained by Mada Masr, DigitalOcean wrote that the interrupted service was not the result of a technical error but had been deliberately caused:

Since you're physically in Egypt, there's not much we would be able to do to prevent them from messing with your traffic... Your government is performing Deep Packet Inspection and is messing somehow with these secure connections.

Data is often transferred over the Internet in small network packets that are "repackaged" and made legible on the recipient's side. Deep packet inspection intercepts the data and examines the identity of communicators and the content of this communication at an inspection point between the sender and recipient. The U.S. company added that they contacted both Egyptian service provider TEData and the Egyptian government to inquire about the interruption.

Days after the interruption in the SSH protocol was detected, access to HTTPS was temporarily blocked. HTTPS is a protocol to securely transfer hypertexts, which constitute the core units of all web pages. The protocol continued to operate without interruption for internet giants like Facebook and Google but was completely blocked for all other websites.

The Open Observatory of Network Interference (OONI) – an international network operating under the Tor Project that monitors internet censorship, traffic manipulation, and signs of surveillance – decided to launch a thorough investigation in August into what was happening in Egypt at the request of technical experts in the country. In October 2016, OONI published a report that confirmed much of what the independent tests had pointed to, as well as DigitalOcean's assessment.

The report indicates that the Tor anonymity network appeared to be interfered with in Egypt, though HTTPS connections to DigitalOcean's Frankfurt data center were throttled. The OONI report also asserted that the access to pornography websites appeared to be interfered with via in-band TCP packet injections of advertisement and malware content and that the temporary blocking of The New Arab's website led to the blocking of specific content (such as images) of other sites that are hosted on the same content distribution network as The New Arab. Freedom House has reported that other VPN and proxy services intended to circumvent censorship, including TunnelBear, CyberGhost, Hotspot Shield, TigerVPN, and ZenVPN have been blocked as well.

In June 2017, Egypt banned at least 62 websites in a crackdown, including Daily Sabah, Medium, Al Jazeera, The Huffington Post, and Mada Masr along with opposition websites, like El-Badil, for containing material that "support terrorism and extremism as well as publish lies." The Association condemned the crackdown on Freedom of Thought and Expression (AFTE), Mada Masr, and by the Index on Censorship. The ATFE stated that "the blocking of websites violates the Egyptian constitution". By October, that figure had climbed to 434 banned websites, including the sites of many opposition organizations and activists.

Similarly, social media pages have been shut down or had content removed or their administrators arrested by the Egyptian government. Although Facebook, Google, and Twitter have not reported receiving formal takedown requests from the Egyptian government, its supporters have reported dozens of satirical anti-government Facebook pages for violating the site's community standards. President Sisi's statement that "with the assistance of two web brigades, I can shut down the pages, take them over and make them my own." led many Egyptian commentators to believe that the takedowns had official support. In December 2016, the Egyptian Ministry of the Interior claimed to have shut down 163 Facebook pages and arrested 14 administrators.

Voice-over-IP (VoIP) services—including WhatsApp, Skype, Viber, FaceTime, and Facebook Messenger—have been intermittently blocked on mobile networks by the NTRA since 2013, though disruptions to VoIP have been reported as early as 2010. The NTRA initially claimed that it was blocking VoIP services for economic reasons, but it became more explicit about the political and security purpose of its blocking in 2015.

The government has shut down Internet and phone networks in the Sinai on multiple occasions since 2014, ostensibly as part of its conflict against the ongoing Islamist Sinai insurgency. These localized shutdowns are timed to coincide with military operations. However, their counterinsurgency effectiveness is limited because of insurgents' widespread usage of workarounds such as walkie-talkies and portable Broadband Global Area Network terminals. However, the shutdowns block emergency calls, preventing civilians from obtaining treatment for combat wounds and, in several cases, preventing women who went into labor from reaching the hospital.

=== Persecutions of Egyptians for online activities ===
A number of Egyptians have been arrested, detained, or imprisoned for their posts on social media. Reasons for these detentions and prosecutions include spreading fake news, inciting violence, insulting the president, and "contempt of religion," and sentences have been as severe as five years in prison. Though arrests initially only targeted known activists and members of opposition groups, particularly the Muslim Brotherhood, in 2017, the Egyptian government began going after unaffiliated Egyptians who criticized it.

Anti-government bloggers are often intimidated or harassed by pro-government individuals and news sites. 6 April Movement founder and activist Esraa Abdel Fattah had personal photos, emails, and recordings of phone calls posted on social media without her consent in 2017, for example. As of 2018, independent media editors can be arrested for maintaining a news site without a license.

LGBT Egyptians became the target of a particularly fierce crackdown in 2017 after several Egyptians were arrested for sharing images of a rainbow flag flying at a Mashrou' Leila concert in Cairo. Although homosexuality is legal in Egypt, LGBT Egyptians are charged with "debauchery and immorality." Fifty-seven LGBT Egyptians were arrested by October 2017, with ten sentenced to one and six years in prison. This crackdown follows similar efforts by Egyptian police to use Grindr, a dating app for gay men, to entrap gay Egyptians. This practice began in 2014 but is still occurring as of 2017.

Human rights organizations have called on the authorities in Egypt to end the trial of the content creators of TikTok who have been prosecuted for exercising their freedom of expression through their online content. Reportedly, 11 defendants were referred to trial in 2020 for sharing content on platforms such as Likee and TikTok. As per IFEX, the Cairo Criminal Court held a session on 31 May 2021 for the hearing of the case of human trafficking involving TikTok influencers.

=== 2019 Egyptian protests ===
In the week after the extremely small 20—21 September 2019 protests, Egyptian authorities blocked, restricted, or temporarily disrupted online communication services, such as BBC News, WhatsApp, and Signal.

== Social media usage ==
A major use of social media in Egypt in recent years has been for political activism and revolutions, and the two most-used websites in Egypt in 2010 were Google and Facebook. Social media sites like Facebook allowed liberal, minority, and religious groups to make communication networks and mobilize protests, as can be seen with the Egyptian Revolution of 2011. Although the Egyptian government began restricting Internet use, protesters still used social media to stay connected. Recently, Egyptian police have been using social media, such as Grindr, to find and arrest homosexual men.

== Internet Revolution Egypt ==
Internet Revolution Egypt was an online protest against the Internet services provided in Egypt for which Telecom Egypt has a monopoly, which occurred in early 2014. The protest mainly took place on Facebook through a page created by young Egyptians; some activity was also seen on Twitter as well. Users within the group were mainly within the 18 to 24 age group. The main Facebook page, has reached more than one million followers and continues to expand. This significant expansion resulted in widespread media attention at the time. In response to some accusations by certain media outlets, the protest stated that it does not relate to politics. The slogan used by the protests is " خدمة سىئه للغايةالأنترنت عندنا في مصر; غالي جدا بطئ ببشاعة .. خدمة عملاء زي الزفت", which means "The internet services in Egypt; are very expensive, terribly slow... The customer service is terrible." in English.

== See also ==
- Ramses Exchange
- Internet censorship in the Arab Spring
