= 2023 in Egypt =

- Decades: 2000s; 2010s; 2020s
- See also: Other events of 2023; List of years in Egypt

Events in the year 2023 in Egypt.

== Incumbents ==
| Photo | Post | Name |
|---|---|---|
| | President of Egypt | Abdel Fattah el-Sisi |
| | Prime Minister of Egypt | Moustafa Madbouly |

== Events ==
Ongoing – COVID-19 pandemic in Egypt

=== January ===
- 7 January – Two people are killed and another person is injured when a roof collapses in Alexandria.

=== February ===
- 10 February – Two people are killed and 20 others are injured by a building collapse in Damanhour, Beheira Governorate.
- 27 February – Egyptian Foreign Minister Sameh Shoukry visits Syria and Turkey for the first time in a decade following strained relations with both countries.

=== March ===
- 1 March – The Egyptian government agrees to restore daylight savings time after a break of 7 years
- 7 March – A train accident in the Egyptian city of Qalyub, killing four people and injuring 26 people

=== June ===
- 3 June – An Egyptian police officer was killed after he crossed the Egyptian-Israeli border. He had killed three Israeli soldiers. His body was later returned to Egypt.
- 8 June – The Egyptian antiquities ministry prohibits a group of archaeologists from the National Museum of Antiquities in Leiden, Netherlands from conducting excavations in Saqqara after the museum unveiled an exhibit about ancient Egyptian music that Egyptian authorities criticized for its Afrocentric depictions of certain figures, claiming it was historical negationism.
- 13 June – Fifteen people are killed and two others are injured after a minibus collides into a parked pickup truck in El Saff.
- 26 June – At least 5 people, including a child, are killed, and five others injured after a 14-story building collapsed in the Sid Beshr area, east of Alexandria.

=== September ===
- 11 September – Reda Hegazy as Minister of Education announced plans for schools to Ban the Niqab.
- 18 September – Nine Egyptian military personnel are killed or injured when a transport truck carrying ammunition overturns in Sharqia Governorate.
- 19 September – The Institut Européen d'Archéologie Sous-Marine announces the discovery of the site of a temple to god Amun and a Greek sanctuary devoted to Aphrodite in the ancient port city of Thonis-Heracleion in the Abu Qir Bay.

=== October ===
- 2 October – Thirty-eight people are injured in a fire at a police facility in Ismailia.
- 8 October – An Egyptian police officer shoots dead two Israeli tourists and an Egyptian guide in Alexandria, prompting Israel to advise its citizens to leave Egypt.
- 20 October – After President El Sisi refused to allow Palestinians Living in Gaza to enter Egypt, Protests broke out across the country, Especially near the Rafah border crossing and in El Tahrir Square.
- 22 October – An Israeli tank accidentally hits an Egyptian position near the border with Gaza. Several Egyptian border guards sustained injuries from fragments of a shell.
- 27 October – Six people were lightly injured after a drone crashed into a building in Taba. The six people would be discharged from the hospital after receiving the necessary first aid.
- 28 October –
  - An Egyptian Army spokesperson said in a statement that investigations into the two drones that fell in Nuweiba and in Taba yesterday showed that they were heading from the south of the Red Sea to the north.
  - At least 32 people are killed and 63 others are injured in a multiple-vehicle collision in Beheira Governorate.
  - The Egyptian foreign ministry has warned of the "humanitarian and security repercussions of the Israeli ground attack" on Gaza, saying "we hold the Israeli government responsible for violating the United Nations General Assembly resolution for an immediate ceasefire and implementing a humanitarian truce”.

=== December ===
- 26 December – A drone launched from the direction of the Red Sea is shot down near the Egyptian resort city of Dahab, according to the Egyptian military. The drone fell into the sea with no casualties or damage reported.

=== Sports ===
- 18 October 2022 – June 2023: 2022–23 Egyptian Premier League
- 16 March – 22 March:
  - 2023 Men's Hockey Junior Africa Cup
  - 2023 Women's Hockey Junior Africa Cup

== Deaths ==
- 3 January – Mohamed Enani, 83, writer and translator.
- 23 January – Sami Sharaf, military officer and politician

== See also ==
- COVID-19 pandemic in Africa
- 2020s
- African Union
- Arab League
- Terrorism in Egypt
- Grand Ethiopian Renaissance Dam
- African Continental Free Trade Area
- Common Market for Eastern and Southern Africa
