= 2027 in Egypt =

- Decades: 2000s; 2010s; 2020s
- See also: Other events of 2027; List of years in Egypt

Events in the year 2027 in Egypt.

== Events ==
=== Predicted and scheduled events ===
- 20 January–7 February – The 2027 African Games will be held in Cairo.
- 2 August – Solar eclipse of August 2, 2027 (total eclipse)
