= 2024 in Egypt =

- Decades: 2000s; 2010s; 2020s
- See also: Other events of 2024; List of years in Egypt

Events in the year 2024 in Egypt.

== Incumbents ==
Photo	Post	Name
	President of Egypt	Abdel Fattah el-Sisi
	Prime Minister of Egypt	Moustafa Madbouly

== Events ==
=== January ===
- January 1 – Egypt formally joins the BRICS group.
- January 3 – The Ministry of Electricity and Renewable Energy announces a 7-20% increase in the price of electricity.
- January 15 – Clashes occur on the Egyptian-Israeli border after 20 armed men arrive at the Egyptian side, prompting the Israel Defence Forces to open fire and inflict several casualties. The IDF announces that one of its soldier was wounded during the clashes.
- January 29 – A project is launched to restore the fallen granite blocks of the facade of the Pyramid of Menkaure back to their original location. It is planned to last for three years.
- January 31 – The price of the US Dollar on the black market reaches 71 EGP (Egyptian pound).

=== February ===
- February 14 – Fifteen people are killed and eight more injured during the collision of a truck and four microbuses in Alexandria.
- February 16 – Egypt announces the establishment of a buffer zone along the Egypt-Gaza border.
- February 26 – Ten people are killed after a ferry sinks along the Nile River in Monshat el-Kanater, Giza Governorate.

=== April ===
- April 2 – Abdel Fattah el-Sisi is inaugurated as president for a third term.
- April 12 – The European Union pledges Egypt with 1 billion euros in short-term financial aid to help stabilise the country's economy.

=== May ===
- May 5 – Hamas announces the end of ceasefire talks held in Cairo, while Israel vows to continue its military operations.
- May 21 – Ten people are killed and nine others are injured after a minibus falls off a ferry into the Nile River in Abu Ghalib, Giza Governorate.
- May 27 – An Egyptian border guard is killed in a shootout at the Rafah Border Crossing.
- May 29 –
  - The government raises the subsidized price of a bread loaf for the first time in three decades, from E£0.05 to E£0.20.
  - Police arrest an Egyptian American TikToker suspected of being a serial killer who killed at least three women after torturing them.

=== July ===
- July 3 – The second cabinet of Prime Minister Mostafa Madbouly is inaugurated.
- July 18 – Egypt's Suez Canal reported a 23.4 percent drop in revenues attributed to disruptions in Red Sea shipping over the past year, marked by attacks from Yemen's Houthi militia on Israeli-linked vessels.
- July 30 – Five people are killed and nine others are injured when a boat capsizes on the Nile River in Cairo.

=== August ===
- August 7 – Egypt issues NOTAM alerts and order their airlines to avoid Iranian and Lebanese airspaces.
- August 9 – French police arrest Egyptian wrestler Mohamed Ibrahim El-Sayed in Paris for alleged sexual assault.
- August 21 – Two people are killed in a level-crossing collision between a train and a truck in Borg El Arab, Alexandria Governorate.
- August 27 – The first batch of Egyptian military officers and equipment arrive in Mogadishu, marking the initial phase of a significant deployment that will see up to ten thousand Egyptian soldiers stationed in Somalia.

=== September ===
- September 14 – Three people are killed and 29 others are injured in a collision between two trains in Zagazig.

=== October ===
- October 13 – One person is killed and 21 others are injured in a collision between two trains in Minya Governorate.
- October 14 – A bus carrying students of Galala University overturns on the Al-Galala highway near Ain Sokhna, Suez Governorate, killing 12 and injuring 33.
- October 20 – The World Health Organization certifies Egypt as free of malaria.

=== November ===
- November 25 – A tourist yacht carrying 44 passengers sinks in the Red Sea off the coast of Wadi El Gemal National Park, leaving four people dead and eight passengers missing.

=== December ===
- December 10 – At least eight people are killed in the collapse of a six-story building in Cairo.
- December 19 – President Sisi signs into law a bill transferring administration of refugees in the country from the UNHCR to Egyptian authorities.
- December 29 – Three police officers are killed in a gas explosion at the Egyptian National Police academy in Cairo.

== Deaths ==
- 26 January: El Amry Farouk, 53, businessman and politician.
- 5 April: Ahmad Fathi Sorour, 91, former Speaker of the People's Assembly of Egypt.
- 13 April: Shereen Seif El-Nasr, 56, actress.
- 19 April: Salah El-Saadany, 80, actor.
- 26 August: Nabil Elaraby, 89, 7th Secretary General of the Arab League.
