= Kahraba (footballer) =

Egyptian footballer (born 1994)

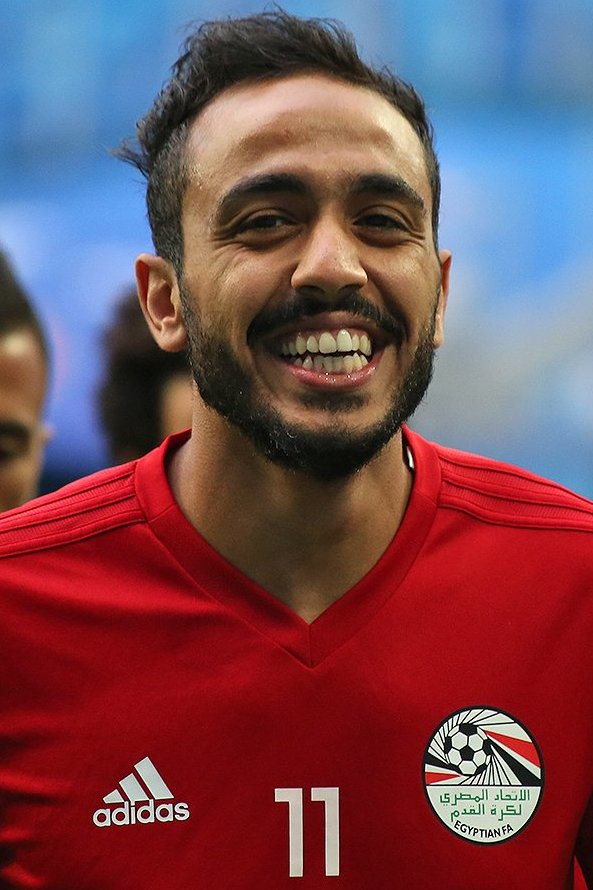
- Kahraba with Egypt at the 2018 FIFA World Cup

Personal information
- Full name: Mahmoud Abdel Moneim Abdel Hamid Soliman
- Date of birth: 13 April 1994 (age 32)
- Place of birth: Old Cairo, Cairo, Egypt
- Height: 1.82 m (6 ft 0 in)
- Position: Left winger

Team information
- Current team: ENPPI
- Number: 10

Youth career
- 2004–2009: Al Ahly
- 2009–2011: ENPPI

Senior career*
Years	Team	Apps	(Gls)
2011–2015	ENPPI	33	(7)
2013–2014	→ Luzern (loan)	16	(7)
2014	→ Grasshopper (loan)	11	(2)
2015–2019	Zamalek	56	(22)
2016–2018	→ Al-Ittihad (Jeddah) (loan)	44	(20)
2019	Desportivo das Aves	5	(1)
2020–2025	Al Ahly	75	(27)
2022	→ Hatayspor (loan)	11	(1)
2025	→ Al-Ittihad (Tripoli) (loan)	16	(6)
2025–2026	Al Qadsia	8	(2)
2026–	ENPPI	8	(1)

International career
2010–2012	Egypt U17	5	(1)
2011–2013	Egypt U20	8	(4)
2012–2015	Egypt U23	7	(2)
2013–2024	Egypt	31	(5)
Medal record
Representing Egypt
Men's football
Africa Cup of Nations
Runner-up	2017
Africa U-20 Cup of Nations
Winner	2013
- * Club domestic league appearances and goals

Mahmoud Abdel Moneim Abdel Hamid Soliman (Arabic: محمود عبد المنعم عبد الحميد سليمان; born 13 April 1994), commonly known as Mahmoud Kahraba (Arabic: محمود كهربا) or simply Kahraba (Arabic: كهربا), is an Egyptian professional footballer who plays as a left winger for ENPPI.

After beginning his career as a youth player with Al Ahly, he made his professional debut in the Egyptian Premier League with ENPPI in 2011. He joined Swiss Super League side FC Luzern on a season-long loan deal in 2013 but left the club in March 2014 after his contract was terminated with Luzern citing inappropriate behaviour. He returned to Switzerland the following season for a six-month loan spell with Grasshopper.

After returning to Egypt, he joined Zamalek where he helped the club to win the Egypt Cup in his first season. He joined Saudi Professional League side Al-Ittihad on loan for two seasons, winning the Saudi Crown Prince Cup and the Kings Cup.

Having represented Egypt at several youth levels, including winning the 2013 Africa U-20 Cup of Nations with the under-20 side, he made his senior international debut in 2013. He was included in Egypt's squads for the 2017 Africa Cup of Nations and the 2018 FIFA World Cup.

== Club career ==
=== Youth ===
Kahraba began his career at with Al Ahly as a youth player, scoring 36 goals in 20 appearances for the side at the age of fifteen after forming a forward partnership with Trézéguet. It was during his time at Al Ahly that he was given the nickname Kahraba ("Electricity") by youth coach Badr Ragab due to his energy and pace.

After the youth team was closed down in 2011, he joined ENPPI and made his professional debut in the Egyptian Premier League on 18 December 2011 in a match against Wadi Degla. He scored his first senior goal the following season during a match against Telephonat Beni Suef after coming on as a substitute. He was offered a trial with English club Hull City but was unable to go after struggling to obtain a work permit with Hull manager Steve Bruce commenting "he’s a very good player, but getting him into the country long-term will be a problem."

=== FC Luzern (loan) ===
He instead moved to FC Luzern in the Swiss Super League on loan, with the club having an option to make the deal permanent, in August 2013. He made his debut for the club a week later, coming on as a substitute during a 1–1 draw with FC Basel. On 5 October 2013, he made his first start for Luzern and opened the scoring after 39 minutes during a 2–0 win over FC Zürich, being named man of the match. After establishing himself in the first team, Kahraba scored six further goals for Luzern to become their second highest goalscorer for the season and the club had opened discussions with ENPPI to extend his loan deal for a further season.

However, at the end of March, Kahraba's loan deal was terminated by the club with immediate effect due to "inappropriate behaviour," with the club releasing a statement that the termination was "a disciplinary action due to several incidents of inappropriate behaviour against the manager Carlos Bernegger, other players and senior officials within the club." Bernegger also accused Kahraba of being unprofessional and commented "I hoped that Kahraba would become a mature adult. Maturity is much more important than the player. Kahraba’s reaction in the end proved that he was not professional and that he could not continue with us." However, Kahraba's agent denied any wrongdoing and claimed that the player had decided to end the loan spell after the club had tried to pressure him into signing a new contract and the relationship had "deteriorated" after he refused.

=== Grasshoppers (loan) ===
After receiving offers from sides in Spain and Germany, Kahraba eventually signed a loan deal with fellow Swiss side Grasshopper Club Zürich in May 2014. The club paid a fee of €100,000 for a six-month loan deal with an option to sign Kahraba on a permanent deal for €1 million. He began pre-season training nearly a week before the rest of the squad, and made his debut for the club as a late substitute in place of Michael Lang during a 1–0 defeat to local rivals FC Zürich. The following week, Kahraba was sent off after receiving a second yellow card during a 2–2 draw with FC Thun, leaving the pitch in tears.

Despite his suspension in the league, Kahraba was included in Grasshopper's squad for their UEFA Champions League qualifying match against French side Lille, making his debut in the competition as a substitute in a 2–0 defeat. In his return to the starting line-up in the Swiss Super League, he scored his first goal for the club in a 2–1 victory over FC Aarau as Grasshoppers' won their first match of the season. Although his loan spell with the club was set to last until 31 December 2014, Kahraba announced his return to ENPPI in November with both sides failing to reach an agreement during negotiations over a permanent transfer having scored twice in seventeen appearances. He also cited a lack of playing time stating "I’m not going to sit on the bench in Europe any longer, I’m 20 years old, I want to play."

=== Return to Egypt ===
Following the end of his loan spell, Kahraba returned to ENPPI and scored four goals in his first twelve appearances. However, following an altercation with general manager Hussein Amin after arriving late for a training session, he was suspended by the club pending an investigation. He briefly returned to the first team before agreeing to a transfer to fellow Egyptian Premier League side Zamalek on a five-year contract for a fee of €750,000.

During his first six months with Zamalek, Kahraba helped the side win the Egyptian Premier League and the Egypt Cup, scoring eight goals in fourteen appearances. His performances led to him being nominated for the 2015 African Most Promising Talent Award. In July 2016, he was suspended by the club after clashing with his coaching staff after he was substituted during a match against rivals Al Ahly.

=== Al-Ittihad ===
In July 2016, Kahraba joined Saudi Arabian side Al-Ittihad on loan for the 2016–17 season for a fee of $2 million. He made his debut for the club on the opening day of the season, scoring in a 3–2 victory over Al-Raed on 11 August 2016. In his third game for Al-Ittihad, Kahraba became the first Egyptian player to score a hat-trick in the Saudi Professional League after helping his side to a 5–3 victory over Al-Wehda, scoring four of his side's goals and assisting the other. He also scored the fastest goal of the season after netting after just 64 seconds of a 4–1 victory over Al-Ettifaq.

His performances led Al-Ittihad to open talks about extending his stay with the club, having scored fifteen goals in twenty appearances including the winning goal in the final of the 2016–17 Saudi Crown Prince Cup during a 1–0 victory over Al-Nassr. Zamalek chairman Mortada Mansour publicly declared that the club would only look to sell Kahraba for offers of €40 million or more. Al-Ittihad later extended his loan spell for a further season, submitting an offer in excess of the $2 million they paid for the first year. In April 2017, he was handed the captaincy for a match against Al-Qadsiah, scoring once as he helped the side to a 4–2 victory. He was fined 500,000 Egyptian pounds by Zamalek in May 2017 after he appeared on an Egyptian TV show without the club's permission alongside Al Ahly player Moamen Zakaria.

To celebrate the club's 90th anniversary, Al-Ittihad held a friendly match against Spanish side Atlético Madrid. Kahraba scored for his side during the match and received praise from Atlético manager Diego Simeone who commented on "his impressive speed and skill." He finished the 2016–17 season as the club's top goalscorer with eighteen in all competitions and finished as the third highest scorer in the Saudi Professional League.

However, he struggled to reproduce his form during his second season, being hampered by a persistent back injury that required surgery. His struggles led to him reacting angrily to jeers from fans in a post match interview following a 3–3 draw with Al-Faisaly which prompted manager José Luis Sierra to defend him, stating "In my opinion Kahraba has to play [...] When he’s in form he’s by far the best forward in the team." At the end of the 2017–18 season, Al-Ittihad announced that their intention was not signing Kahraba on a permanent deal following the end of his loan spell.

=== Desportivo das Aves ===
On 25 July 2019, Kahraba signed a two-year deal with Primeira Liga side Aves.

=== Al Ahly SC ===
On 13 December 2019, Kahraba signed a four-year and half deal with the Egyptian league side Al Ahly, returning to his boyhood club.

==== Loans to Hatayspor and Al Ittihad Tripoli ====
Kahraba was loaned out to Turkish Süper Lig side Hatayspor in 2022. He scored his first goal and provided two assists in a 4–1 win over Giresunspor on 22 May. He later returned to his parent club Al Ahly, signing a new contract in May 2023 until 2026. He then joined Libyan club Al Ittihad on loan in January 2025.

=== Qadsia ===
Kahraba signed for Kuwaiti side Qadsia in August 2025. He terminated his contract with the club on 2 February 2026.

=== Return to ENPPI ===
On 9 February 2026, Kahraba returned to ENPPI on a free transfer until the end of the 2025–26 season.

== International career ==
=== Youth ===
Kahraba was part of the Egypt under-20 that won the Africa U-20 Cup of Nations in March 2013 for the first time in ten years, winning the penalty for Egypt's goal and scoring in the penalty shoot-out after the match against Ghana ended in a 1–1 draw after extra time. He was also named in the team of the tournament and finished the tournament as a joint second-highest scorer with three goals.

Two months later, he was named in the provisional squad for the 2013 FIFA U-20 World Cup in Turkey, scoring a brace during an 8–0 victory over Kosovo in a warm up fixture. After being named in the final squad, he scored Egypt's goal in a 2–1 defeat against Chile in their opening group match and played in his side's remaining two group matches against Iraq and England as they were eliminated in the group stage.

=== Senior ===
Kahraba made his debut for the Egypt senior side on 10 September 2013 in a 4–2 victory over Guinea. He scored his first senior international on 6 September 2015 during a 5–1 victory over Chad. He was named in the squad for the 2017 Africa Cup of Nations and, on 27 January 2017, he scored the winning goal in the quarterfinal of the tournament against Morocco. Egypt went on to reach the final before losing to Cameroon with Kahraba an unused substitute during the final. In May 2018 he was named in Egypt's preliminary squad for the 2018 FIFA World Cup in Russia. After being selected in the final 23-man squad, he came on as a substitute in all three of Egypt's group matches during defeats to Uruguay, Russia and Saudi Arabia as they were eliminated in the group stage.

== Personal life ==
Kahraba was briefly married in 2016 to television presenter and businesswoman Sarah Khalifa. The couple divorced six months later.

== Career statistics ==
=== Club ===
As of match played on 9 December 2023

Appearances and goals by club, season and competition
Club	Season	League			National Cup		League Cup		Continental		Oher		Total	
Club	Season	Division	Apps	Goals	Apps	Goals	Apps	Goals	Apps	Goals	Apps	Goals	Apps	Goals
ENPPI	2010–11	EPL	0	0	1	0	—						1	0
ENPPI	2011–12	EPL	3	0	0	0	—				0	0	3	0
ENPPI	2012–13	EPL	13	1	0	0	—						13	1
ENPPI	2014–15	EPL	17	6	1	1	—						18	7
ENPPI	Total		33	7	2	1	0	0	0	0	0	0	35	8
Luzern (loan)	2013–14	SSL	16	7	3	0	—						19	7
Luzern (loan)	Total		16	7	3	0	0	0	0	0	0	0	19	7
Grasshopper (loan)	2014–15	SSL	11	2	2	0	—		4	0	—		17	2
Grasshopper (loan)	Total		11	2	2	0	0	0	4	0	0	0	17	2
Zamalek	2014–15	EPL	0	0	4	0	—		0	0	—		4	0
Zamalek	2015–16	EPL	29	11	1	0	—		4	2	1	1	35	14
Zamalek	2018–19	EPL	27	11	2	0	—		14	2	1	0	43	13
Zamalek	Total		56	22	7	0	0	0	18	4	1	1	83	27
Al-Ittihad (loan)	2016–17	SPL	20	16	0	0	4	2	—				24	18
Al-Ittihad (loan)	2017–18	SPL	24	4	5	2	0	0	—				29	6
Al-Ittihad (loan)	Total		44	20	5	2	4	2	0	0	0	0	53	24
C.D. Aves	2019–20	Primeira Liga	5	1	0	0	0	0	—				5	1
C.D. Aves	Total		5	1	0	0	0	0	0	0	0	0	5	1
Al Ahly	2019–20	EPL	15	5	3	1	—		5	0	1	0	24	6
Al Ahly	2020–21	EPL	26	8	2	0	—		6	2	2	0	36	10
Al Ahly	2022–23	EPL	14	7	1	1	—		10	6	0	0	24	14
Al Ahly	2023–24	EPL	0	0	0	0	—		5	3	4	2	9	5
Al Ahly	Total		55	20	5	2	0	0	25	11	7	2	93	35
Hatayspor (loan)	2021–22	Süper Lig	11	1	0	0	0	0	—				11	1
Hatayspor (loan)	Total		11	1	0	0	0	0	0	0	0	0	11	1
Career totals			231	80	25	5	4	2	46	14	8	3	315	103

=== International ===
As of 18 November 2019

Egypt
Year	Apps	Goals
2013	3	0
2014	0	0
2015	6	1
2016	1	0
2017	8	2
2018	7	0
2019	2	1
Total	27	4

=== International goals ===
Scores and results list Egypt's goal tally first.

#	Date	Venue	Opponent	Score	Result	Competition
1.	6 September 2015	Stade Omnisports Idriss Mahamat Ouya, N'Djamena, Chad	Chad	4–1	5–1	2017 Africa Cup of Nations qualification
2.	29 January 2017	Stade de Port-Gentil, Port-Gentil, Gabon	Morocco	1–0	1–0	2017 Africa Cup of Nations
3.	28 March 2017	Borg El Arab Stadium, Alexandria, Egypt	Togo	1–0	3–0	Friendly
4.	14 November 2019	Borg El Arab Stadium, Alexandria, Egypt	Kenya	1–0	1–1	2021 Africa Cup of Nations qualification

== Honours ==
ENPPI

- Egypt Cup: 2010–11

Zamalek

- Egypt Cup: 2014–15, 2015–16
- CAF Confederation Cup: 2018–19
- Saudi-Egyptian Super Cup: 2018

Al-Ittihad

- King Cup: 2018
- Crown Prince Cup: 2016–17

Al Ahly

- Egyptian Premier League: 2019–20, 2022–23, 2023–24, 2024–25
- Egypt Cup: 2019–20, 2021–22, 2022–23
- Egyptian Super Cup: 2022–23, 2023–24
- CAF Champions League: 2019–20, 2020–21, 2022–23, 2023–24
- CAF Super Cup: 2021
- FIFA African–Asian–Pacific Cup: 2024

Egypt U20

- African U-20 Championship: 2013

Individual

- CAF Champions League Top Goalscorer: 2023
- African Football League Top Goalscorer: 2023
- African Goal of the Year: 2023
