= Mofeed Fawzy =

Egyptian TV presenter (1933–2022)

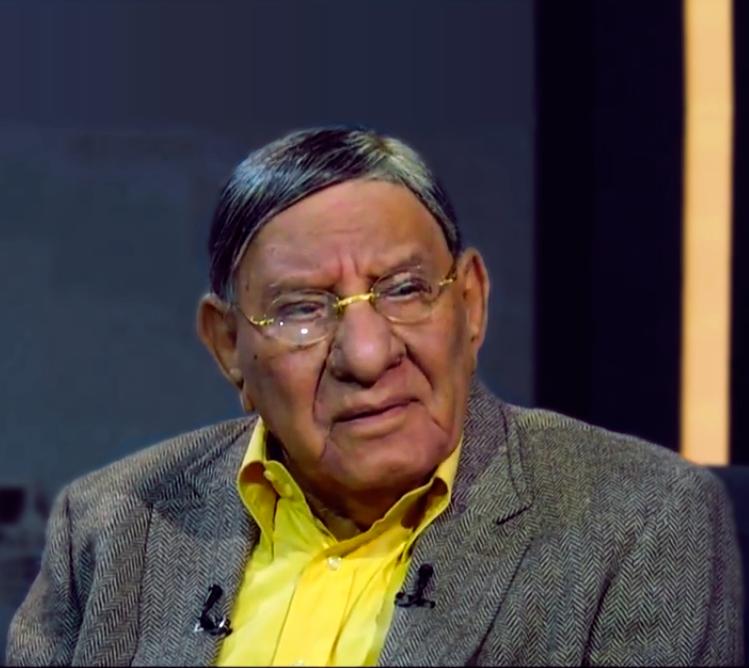
- Born: 19 June 1933 (age 92); Beni Suef
- Occupations: Television presenter, Writer, Journalist

Mofeed or Mufid Fawzy (Arabic: مفيد فوزي; 19 June 1933 – 4 December 2022) was an Egyptian television presenter, interviewer and journalist. He produced and presented on Egyptian "Talk of the Town" (Arabic: حديث المدينة Hadeeth Al Madena) for nearly 26 years.

He was also a talk show co-host for Al-Qahira Al-Youm, a popular live talk show from Cairo, which airs on Orbit TV's El Yawm Channel (Arabic: قناة اليوم). Mufid Fawzy was also the editor-in-chief of صباح الخير "Sabāh al-Khayr" Good Morning magazine published by Rose al-Yūsuf. Fawzy was married to late broadcaster Amal El-Omdah with whom he had one daughter - writer, poet and journalist for Nisft Al-Dunya magazine, Hanan Mofeed Fawzy. Fawzy died on 4 December 2022 at the age of 89.

== See also ==
- List of Egyptians
- List of Copts
