= Embassy of Palestine, Cairo =

Embassy of the Palestine in Egypt سفارة فلسطين في جمهورية مصر العربية
- Location: New Cairo
- Address: Central of City, 4th Sector, Parcel 24/2
- Ambassador: Vacant
- Consul General: Ahmed Dabbas
- Website: palembeg.ps/en

The Embassy of Palestine in Cairo (Arabic: سفارة فلسطين في القاهرة) is the diplomatic mission of Palestine in Egypt.

== List of ambassadors ==
No.	Name	Name in Arabic	Appointment	Dismissal	Remarks
1	Said Wasfi Kamal	سعيد وصفي كمال	1988	1994	
2	Zuhdi al-Qudra	زهدي القدرة	1994	2005	
3	Munther ad-Dajani	منذر الدجاني	2005	2008	
4	Nabil Amr	نبيل عمرو	2008	2009	
5	Barakat al-Farra	بركات الفرا	2009	2014	
6	Jamal Al Shobaki	جمال الشوبكي	2014	2017	
7	Diab Allouh	دياب اللوح	2017	2026	Died in office.

== See also ==
- List of diplomatic missions in Egypt
- List of diplomatic missions of Palestine
