= Hussein Abdo Hamza =

Egyptian jurist (1949–2022)

- حسين عبده خليل

President of the Egyptian State Lawsuits Authority
- In office 1 July 2017 – 22 August 2019
- Succeeded by: Abu Bakr al-Seddiq Amer

Aswan SC
- In office 2012–2014

Personal details
- Born: Hussein Abdo Khalil Hamza; 24 August 1949 Aswan, Egypt
- Died: 6 August 2022 (aged 72)
- Education: Ain Shams University (LL.B.)

Hussein Abdo Khalil Hamza (Arabic: حسين عبده خليل; 24 August 1949 – 6 August 2022) was an Egyptian counselor who served as President of Egyptian State Lawsuits Authority from 1 July 2017 to 24 August 2019. He also served as the President of Aswan Club from 2012 to 2014. He was born in the village of Abreem, Nasr City, Nuba, Aswan Governorate.

== Presidency of the State Lawsuits Authority ==
He was appointed chairman of the State Lawsuits Authority, on 1 July 2017, by a decree of President Abdel Fattah al-Sisi.

On 22 August 2019, Hussein retired and was succeeded by Abu Bakr al-Seddiq Amer as the new head of the State Lawsuits Authority.
