= Ramses Exchange =

Telecoms building in downtown Cairo, Egypt

Coordinates: 30°03′18″N 31°14′24″E

The Ramses Exchange is a telecoms building in downtown Cairo that is a focal point of the Internet in Egypt. It is situated at 26 Ramses Street. It was built in the 1980s.

Reports related to the 2011 Internet shutdown in Egypt refer to the Ramses Exchange as the location where the shut down was effected by powering down parts of the exchange. The Ramses Exchange, located near the center of Cairo is the main "wire center" for Telecom Egypt, carrying not only municipal telecommunications traffic, but also serving as the main point of entry for international submarine fiber-optic circuits, back-hauled from landing stations near Alexandria.

The Ramses Exchange is also the location of the Cairo Internet Exchange (CAIX). This IX is provides connections between all the major in-country operators in Egypt Additionally; it once housed the Cairo Regional Internet Exchange (CRIX), which once claimed it was the largest Internet exchange in North Africa or the Middle East.

On 7 July 2025, a fire in the building caused widespread disruption to the internet in Egypt.

== See also ==
- Internet in Egypt
