= Internet censorship in the Arab Spring =

The level of Internet censorship in the Arab Spring was escalated. Lack of Internet freedom was a tactic employed by authorities to quell protests. Rulers and governments across the Arab world utilized the law, technology, and violence to control what was being posted on and disseminated through the Internet. In Egypt, Libya, and Syria, the populations witnessed full Internet shutdowns as their respective governments attempted to quell protests. In Tunisia, the government of Zine El Abidine Ben Ali hacked into and stole passwords from citizens' Facebook accounts. In Saudi Arabia and Bahrain, bloggers and "netizens" were arrested and some are alleged to have been killed. The developments since the beginning of the Arab Spring in 2010 have raised the issue of Internet access as a human right and have revealed the type of power certain authoritarian governments retain over the people and the Internet.

== Egypt ==
In the days leading up to 27 January 2011, an increasing number of websites were blocked. On 25 January 2011, the State Security Investigations Service, Amn El Dawla, ordered Twitter to be blocked. The following day, Facebook was shut down. On the night of 27 January 2011 the Egyptian government shut down the Internet in Egypt. SMS (Short Message Service) was also blocked. Popular Voice Over Internet Protocol (VOIP) "backchannel" services such as WhatsApp, used on mobile devices was targeted as well. Renesys, a firm that monitors the Internet, reported that nearly all routes to Egyptian networks were taken down at the same time. It was also reported that the Egyptian government shut down official Domain Name Servers (DNS).

Before the shutdown, activists used social networking sites to publicize police brutality and calls for demonstrations, most notably the Facebook page "We Are All Khaled Said", which has been described as a catalyst that helped promote and organize the 2011 protests. The "We Are All Khaled Said" page acquired over 40,000 Facebook fans, and in the weeks leading up to the revolution over 32,000 Facebook groups and 14,000 Facebook pages were created by Egyptians in protest of the regime. Some protesters also carried posters that explicitly referenced Facebook and thanked its users, including signs and graffiti bearing slogans such as "Facebook" and "Thank you, boys of Facebook".

In response to the Egyptian government's restrictions on communications, on 1 February 2011, President Barack Obama issued a statement saying that "we stand for universal values, including the rights of the Egyptian people to freedom of assembly, freedom of speech, and the freedom to access information." U.S. Secretary of State Hillary Clinton similarly told reporters after a meeting with Jordanian Foreign Minister Nasser Judeh that the United States "support[s] the universal rights of the Egyptian people, including the rights to freedom of expression, association, and assembly," and urged Egyptian authorities "not to prevent peaceful protests or block communications, including on social media sites."

At the time the Egyptian government essentially controlled what information traveled across the country as well as in and out of the country via the Internet. To connect to foreign countries by way of the Internet, Egyptian information had to go through a small number of international portals. Mubarak and the government maintained tight control over these. While access to domestic Internet was still available this too suffered as a result of the shutdown as Egyptian networks were heavily dependent upon systems based outside of the country such as Google, Microsoft, and Yahoo. The entire internal system was crippled. Jim Cowie, the chief technology officer of Renesys, remarked, "With the scope of their shutdown and the size of their online population, it is an unprecedented event".

In Egypt at the time, Internet Service Providers (ISPs) were authorized by the government. There existed only four ISPs: Link Egypt, Vodafone Egypt/Raya, Telecom Egypt, and Etisalat Misr. The government is thought to have ordered these shut down through phone calls. Vodafone is based in London. The company stated on its website that mobile operators in Egypt had been forced to cut off service in certain areas and had no choice in the matter.

American company Narus, a subsidiary of Boeing Corporation, sold the Mubarak government surveillance equipment that helped identify dissidents.

Most affected by the Internet blackout were middle-class Egyptians as they no longer had Internet access in their homes. In response to the lack of information, many took to the streets to find out what was going on. Some have argued that the shutdown's impact was therefore counter to the government's intention as many left their homes to acquire information and subsequently joined the protests.

One building on Ramses Street in Cairo was specifically targeted. It houses a connection point used by five major network companies in Egypt that provide much of the Internet flow going in and out of the country. It has been debated whether the government surgically tampered with the software that facilitates communication between Internet networks or whether they simply cut off the power to the routers.

On 2 February 2011, BBC reported that Facebook and Twitter were once again available online and that the four major Internet Service Providers in Egypt were back up and running. Renesys reported that there were no longer any traffic blocks in place. Arbor Networks also confirmed that Egypt had regained Internet access at around 5:30 a.m. on the morning of February 2.

The Organisation for Economic Co-operation and Development (OECD) estimated the cost of the Internet outage to have been around 90 million US dollars – this number captures the revenue lost from blocked telecommunication and Internet services.

== Libya ==
In mid-February 2011 the Muammar Gaddafi government severed Internet access and international phone calls in eastern Libya in response to violent protests. News was able to be leaked through rare Internet satellite connections which made possible intermittent Skype calls, MSN chats, and mobile video uploads.

It was Friday night, 18 February 2011, that Libya experienced a complete Internet shutdown. The country totally vanished from the Internet for 6.8 hours until service was partially restored Saturday morning at around 8:01 a.m.. It was cut off once again at around 10:00 p.m. the next day, Saturday, 19 February 2011 (local time) for another 8.3 hours. Once the country regained Internet access, traffic to popular websites such as Google increased steadily until 3 March 2011, when the Internet was cut once again.

It is speculated that the Internet shutdown in March was aimed at preventing anti-government protests planned for the days to follow. Arbor Networks, based in the U.S., reported that all Internet traffic coming in and out of Libya had ceased starting at about noon on Thursday, 3 March. This second Internet shutdown was described as "more technologically advanced" than the previous. Instead of simply shutting down Internet servers, the online routes remained open but traffic was "blackholed" before it could enter Libyan cyberspace.

At first, the reason for the shutdown was unclear. Jim Cowie, the chief technology officer of the Internet intelligence firm Renesys, stated "The outages have lasted hours, and then service has resumed. All of that is consistent with alternative explanations, such as power problems or some other kind of single-operator engineering issue".

Some have argued that the impact of an Internet shutdown in Libya was less severe than in countries like Egypt because relatively few Libyans have Internet access. According to the research group OpenNet Initiative, at the time only about 6 percent of Libyans had home or public Internet access. In Egypt the number was 24 percent, in the United States 81. However, as noted by Jillian York, coordinator of the OpenNet Initiative, the few Libyans that did have Internet access were educated and politically aware and therefore more influential. Leslie Harris, president of the Center for Democracy and Technology, noted that the Internet shutdown would make it more difficult for Libyans, especially those in the capital Tripoli, to receive updates about the state of the protests around the country.

Though the Libyan government owns the nation's two mobile telephone providers, cell phone service appeared to be largely unaffected. Some did, however, describe the service as "spotty".

== Syria ==
The Assad government, labeled a "tech-savvy foe," closely monitored online dissidents. In May 2011, Syrian activists noticed that the telecommunications ministry was tapping into Facebook activity – passwords and private messages were suspected to have been stolen and read. Soon after, what appeared to be a Facebook login page popped up on Syrian internet users' computers. It was in actuality a "phishing" site, used to acquire usernames and passwords.

In September 2011, an online battle between pro- and anti-government groups in Syria began to gain attention. The self-proclaimed Syrian Electronic Army (SEA), a pro-government group, was accused of using the Internet to attack its opposition since early on in the uprising. The group hacked into websites of organizations critical of or opposed to the government and defaced their main pages.

On 26 September 2011, SEA hackers hacked the Harvard University website and replaced the home page with a picture of Assad along with a message accusing the United States of supporting the Syrian rebels. The message threatened retaliation.

Although there is no concrete evidence that the SEA was directly linked to the Assad government, some suspect the government and the SEA were more affiliated than the two parties have let on. On 20 June 2011, Assad praised the group in a speech, calling them "a real army in a virtual reality".

The SEA began offering online instructions on how to use Denial of Service (DoS) software to attack anti-government websites. The software, called "Bunder Fucker 1.0", targeted four news sites: Al-Jazeera, BBC, Syrian satellite broadcaster Orient TV, and Dubai-based al-Arabia TV. Ironically, several hackers used this software to target Syrian government and pro-government websites.

Helmi Norman of the Munk School of Global Affairs in Toronto, Canada, noted "The Syrian Computer Society was headed by al-Assad himself in the 1990s before he became president." This group later became and registered the domain name of the "Syrian Electronic Army."

On June 3, The Washington Post reported that all Internet access in Syria had been cut. This came as around 50,000 protestors filled the streets to remember the children killed during the protests as well as to demand that president Assad step down. Though Internet access was blocked, The New York Times reported that more than 30 protestors were killed that day - that number, however, could not be confirmed. A Google Traffic transparency report showed a severe drop in Internet usage in Syria on 3 June 2011. Though Syrian internet had long been monitored, this was the first instance of a complete shutdown.

Syrian internet had relied on a single government-owned provider, Syriatel. When the internet blackout took effect, the only websites that remained accessible were those owned and run by the government, including the oil ministry's website. Even these sites, however, were operating more slowly than usual.

On 4 June 2011, U.S. Secretary of State Hillary Clinton criticized the shutdown. "The United States... stands for universal human rights, including freedom of expression, and we call on all governments to respect them".

== Tunisia ==
Tunisia has one of the most developed Internet systems for the lowest cost in all of North Africa. While the government under Ben Ali sought to spread Internet access across the country, censorship of web content was extensive. The government used laws, regulations, and surveillance to control what was posted and read. Journalists were prosecuted for offending the president through online material, disturbing order, or publishing what the government considered false news. Human rights lawyer Mohamed Abbou was sentenced to three and a half years in prison for accusing the government in 2005 of torturing Tunisian prisoners.

In late 2010 Joe Sullivan, then chief security officer of Facebook, noticed issues with Tunisian political protest Facebook pages. "We were getting anecdotal reports saying, 'It looks like someone logged into my account and deleted it'". Due to the common practice of reassigning IP addresses in Tunisia, however, it was impossible to determine for certain that accounts were being hacked. Later (in 2011) it was discovered that the authorities in Tunisia which censored the Internet had been stealing individuals' passwords.

Facebook was of great importance in the Tunisian response to internet censorship by the government, according to Jillian York of the Berkman Center for the Internet and Society. Bloggers and activists could upload videos to Facebook, which was of crucial importance at a time when most other video-sharing sites had been blocked.

After intense investigation, Sullivan and his team discovered that the government was running a malicious piece of code that recorded password on websites such as Facebook. Sullivan maintained that it was a "security issue" and not a "political issue" – he and his team were concerned with protecting people's accounts. In response to the problem the team implemented two technical solutions, one of which involved users being asked to identify photos of friends when logging in.

Internet freedom was a major concern and primary cause of the Tunisian Revolution. As such, the provisional government that took over after the ouster of Ben Ali immediately proclaimed complete freedom of information and expression. They abolished the information ministry on January 17, 2011.

== Saudi Arabia ==
For as long as there has been Internet access in Saudi Arabia, Internet censorship has been widespread. The country's Communications & Information Technology Commission censors anything from pornography to calls to overthrow the government by striking down websites. However, Saudi web consultant Khalid M. Baheyeldin states that religious figures and students tend to be the ones who flag offensive sites – "There's a feeling of moral conviction that obliges people to have these sites blocked," he says. While the West strongly opposes Internet censorship there is strong support in Saudi Arabia for government control of pornography and "harsh ideas".

After protests began in the beginning of 2011, protestors called for a "Day of Rage" on Facebook and Twitter. The protests were scheduled to take place on 11 March 2011. Some who supported the protests on Facebook were arrested by the government which proclaimed the dangers of activism.

On March 2, one of the main organizers of the "Day of Rage," Faisal Ahmed Abdul-Ahadwas, was alleged to have been killed by Saudi security forces. At the time the Facebook group had over 17,000 members. Online activists claimed that Abdul-Ahadwas had been killed and that the authorities had taken his body in order to remove any evidence.

== Bahrain ==
During the Arab Spring, Bahrain was condemned both for Internet censorship and actions against bloggers and "netizens" (a portmanteau of "citizen" and "internet").

On 2 April 2011 Bahraini authorities detained blogger Zakariya Rashid Hassan al-Ashiri. Al-Ashiri ran a news website that focused on human rights, business, and culture. Authorities charged him with promoting secularism and inciting hatred against the government. Al-Ashiri was detained but died after only seven days. Authorities claimed that the blogger died from complications due to sickle cell anaemia. However, pictures were discovered that showed bruises all over his body, indicating beatings. His death in custody provoked an outcry from the international community.

Other bloggers and "netizens" who were detained in 2011 during the uprisings include Fadhel Abdulla Ali Al-Marzooq, Ali Hasan Salman Al-Satrawi, Hani Muslim Mohamed Al-Taif, and Abduljalil Al-Singace. Mujtaba Salmat and Hussain Abbas Salim, both photographers, were arrested on 17 March 2011 and 28 March 2011, respectively, for taking pictures of the demonstrations in Pearl Square and posting them on Facebook.

On 28 March 2011, the International Federation for Human Rights reported that the military prosecutor general of Bahrain decreed it unlawful to publish any information about investigations by military prosecutors. This made it more difficult still for Bahrainis to report human rights violations.

In 2012, Reporters Without Borders added Bahrain to its list of "Enemies of the Internet".
