= 2022 Women's Africa Hockey5s World Cup Qualifier =

1st Africa Hockey5s World Cup Qualifier
Tournament details
- Host country: Egypt
- City: Ismailia
- Dates: 10 December 2022–15 December 2022
- Venue: Suez Canal Authority Stadium

Final positions
- Champions: Namibia
- Runner-up: Zambia
- Third place: South Africa

Tournament statistics
- Matches played: 12
- Goals scored: 58 (4.83 per match)
- Top scorer: (Zambia) Carol Nakombe (7 goals)

The 1st Africa Hockey5s World Cup Qualifier was the first edition of the Africa Hockey5s World Cup Qualifier for the women's Hockey5s event at the FIH Hockey5s World Cup. It was held alongside the men's tournament in Ismailia, Egypt from 10–15 December 2022.

The winner of the tournament qualified for the 2024 Hockey5s World Cup.

== Teams ==
- Kenya
- Zambia
- Namibia
- Egypt
- South Africa

== Results ==
Pos	Team	Pld	W	D	L	GF	GA	GD	Pts	Qualification
1	Zambia	4	3	0	1	18	11	+7	9	Final
2	Namibia	4	3	0	1	14	9	+5	9	Final
3	South Africa	4	2	0	2	17	9	+8	6	Final
4	Egypt (H)	4	1	0	3	10	17	−7	3	Final
5	Kenya	4	1	0	3	4	17	−13	3	

Source: FIH
Rules for classification: 1) points; 2) matches won; 3) goal difference; 4) goals for; 5) head-to-head result; 6) field goals for.
(H) Hosts

10 December 2022
10:00

Kenya	0–5 (Note: The match resulted in a walkover, after the Kenyan team arrived late and did not made it in time for the game.)	Zambia
	Report

Umpires:
Sharne Mayers (ZIM)
Fatma Mahmoud (EGY)

10 December 2022
11:00

Namibia	5–1	Egypt
Myburgh 4', 11'; Rix 12'; Kruger 16'; Meyer 17'	Report	Darwish 17'

Umpires:
Sharne Mayers (ZIM)
Abraham Chaya (ZAM)

10 December 2022
14:00

South Africa	4–5	Zambia
Marks 6'; Jansen van Vuren 14'; Verster 15'; De la Rey 17'	Report	Nakombe 8', 9', 18'; Kalomo 9', 10'

Umpires:
Sharne Mayers (ZIM}
Fatma Mahmoud (EGY)

10 December 2022
15:00

Kenya	0–5	Egypt
	Report

Umpires:
Abraham Chaya (ZAM)
Sedtric Makati (NAM)

11 December 2022
10:00

Egypt	3–6	Zambia
Morsy 9', 17'; Abdelaziz 10'	Report	Kalomo 7'; Nakombe 8', 17', 18'; Zulu 11'; Nankala 12'

Umpires:
Sedtric Makati (NAM)
Simon Awasa (NGR)

11 December 2022
11:00

Namibia	3–2	South Africa
Rix 1', 12'; Myburgh 11'	Report	Marks 5', 16'

Umpires:
Sharne Mayers (ZIM)
Haitham Selim (EGY)

11 December 2022
14:00

Kenya	0–5	South Africa
	Report

Umpires:
Fatma Mahmoud (EGY)
Abraham Chaya (ZAM)

13 December 2022
10:00

Zambia	2–4	Namibia
Kalomo 7'; Nakombe 14'	Report	Kruger 1'; Coetzee 9'; Van Staden 10'; Myburgh 14'

Umpires:
Sharne Mayers (ZIM)
Charity Majimbo (KEN)

13 December 2022
11:00

South Africa	6–1	Egypt
Van Jaarsveldt 5', 6', 18'; Jansen van Vuren 8'; Verster 15', 17'	Report	El Fatiri 20'

Umpires:
Abraham Chaya (ZAM)
Charity Majimbo (KEN)

13 December 2022
14:00

Namibia	2–4	Kenya
Meyer 9'; Kruger 13'	Report	Kemunto 8'; Chebet 11'; Opondo 13', 18'

Umpires:
Haitham Selim (EGY)
Sharne Mayers (ZIM)

=== Third place game ===
15 December 2022
11:00

South Africa	7–0	Egypt
Van Jaarsveldt 4', 8', 20'; Phume 12'; De la Rey 13'; Jansen van Vuren 14'; Marks 18'	Report

Umpires:
Abraham Chaya (ZAM)
Charity Majimbo (KEN)

=== Final ===
15 December 2022
13:00

Zambia	1–2	Namibia
Kalomo 17'	Report	Kruger 8'; Schimming 14'

Umpires:
Sharne Mayers (ZIM)
Fatma Mahmoud (EGY)

== Goalscorers ==
There were 58 goals scored in 12 matches, for an average of 4.83 goals per match.

7 goals

- (Zambia) Carol Nakombe

6 goals

- (South Africa) Sylvia van Jaarsveldt

5 goals

- (Zambia) Martha Kalomo

4 goals

- (Namibia) Taramarie Myburgh
- (South Africa) Toni Marks

3 goals

- (Namibia) Jivanka Kruger
- (Namibia) Charlize Rix
- (South Africa) Lezaan Jansen van Vuren
- (South Africa) Izelle Verster

2 goals

- (Egypt) Nahla Morsy
- (Kenya) Aurelia Opondo
- (Namibia) Danja Meyer
- (South Africa) Teshawn de la Rey

1 goal

- (Egypt) Fifi Abdelaziz
- (Egypt) Aya Darwish
- (Egypt) Sama El Fatiri
- (Kenya) Eleanor Chebet
- (Kenya) Naom Kemunto
- (Namibia) Anthea Coetzee
- (Namibia) Jahntwa Kruger
- (Namibia) Kaela Schimming
- (Namibia) Armin van Staden
- (South Africa) Reabetswe Phume
- (Zambia) Martha Nankala
- (Zambia) Falesy Zulu

Source: FIH

== Final standing ==
Rank	Team
1st place, gold medalist(s)	Namibia
2nd place, silver medalist(s)	Zambia
3rd place, bronze medalist(s)	South Africa
4	Egypt
5	Kenya

== See also ==
- 2022 Men's Africa Hockey5s World Cup Qualifier
