= Moufed Mahmoud Shehab =

Egyptian politician (1936–2026)

Mufid Mahmoud Shehab (Arabic: مفيد محمود شهاب; January 1936 – 15 February 2026) was an Egyptian politician.

== Life and career ==
Shehab was born in Alexandria in January 1936. He was the Cairo University President (1993–1997), Minister of Higher Education and Minister of State for Scientific Research Affairs (1997–2004), Minister of State for Shura Council Affairs (2004–2005), Minister of State for Legal Affairs and Parliamentary Councils (2005–2011) and Minister of State for Legal Affairs and People's Assembly Affairs in 2011.

Shehab died on 15 February 2026, at the age of 90.
