= Diab Al-Louh =

Palestinian diplomat (1958–2026)

- دياب اللوح
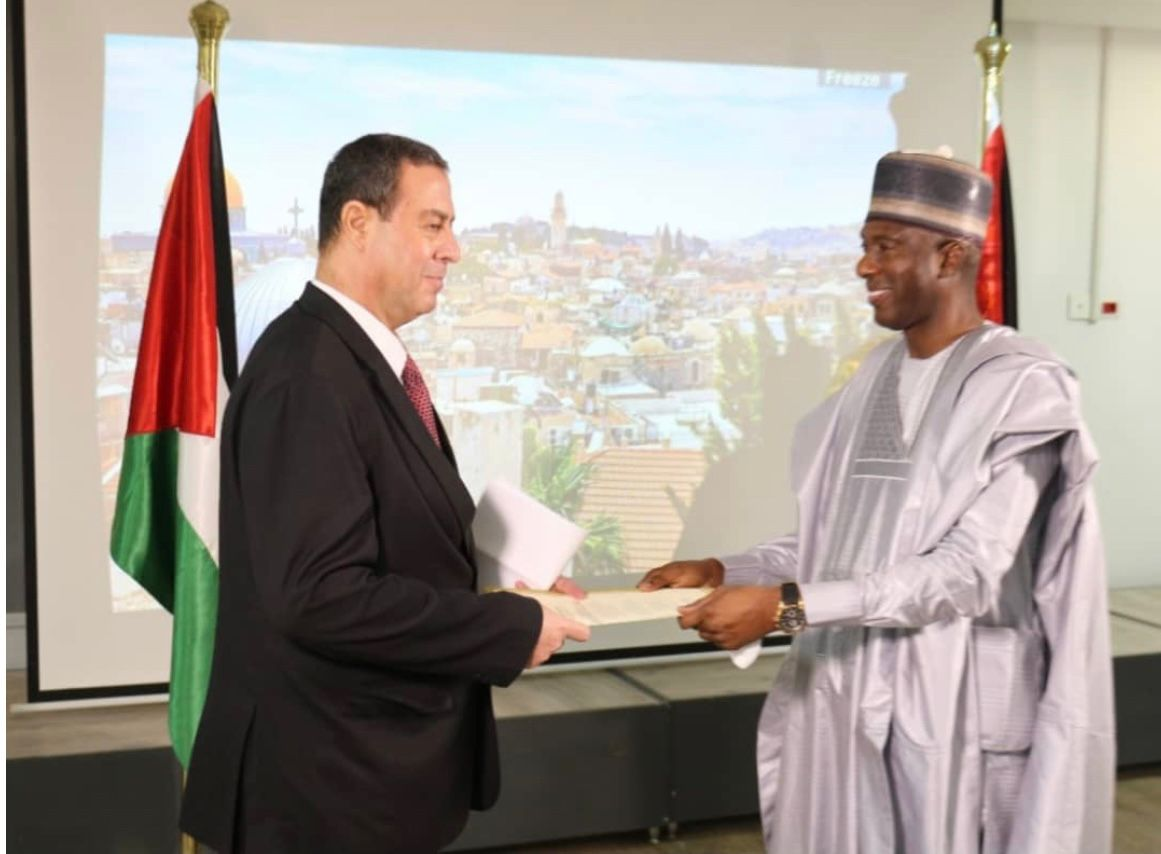
- Al-Louh (left) with Nura Abba Rimi in 2021
- Born: Diab Nimer Mohammad Al-Louh; 28 December 1958; Gaza City, All-Palestine Protectorate
- Died: 9 August 2026 (aged 67); Cairo, Egypt
- Occupations: Politician; diplomat

Diab Al-Louh (Arabic: دياب اللوح, romanized: Diyāb al-Lawḥ; 28 December 1958 – 9 August 2026) was a Palestinian politician and diplomat. A member of Fatah, he served as Palestine's ambassador to the People's Republic of China, Yemen, Mauritania, and Egypt, as well as its representative to the League of Arab States.

Al-Louh was arrested by Israel Defense Forces in August 1977 and sentenced to 15 years in prison. After his release, he held positions in the Palestinian public administration before joining the Ministry of Foreign Affairs in 2005. He was appointed ambassador to the PRC in 2005, Yemen in 2013, and Mauritania in 2016.

In November 2017, Al-Louh was appointed Ambassador of the State of Palestine to Egypt and Permanent Representative to the League of Arab States. He served as permanent representative until May 2023 and continued as ambassador to Egypt until his death.

Al-Louh died in Cairo, Egypt on 9 August 2026, at the age of 67.
