= Youssef Afifi =

Egyptian politician (1927–2026)

- يوسف عفيفي
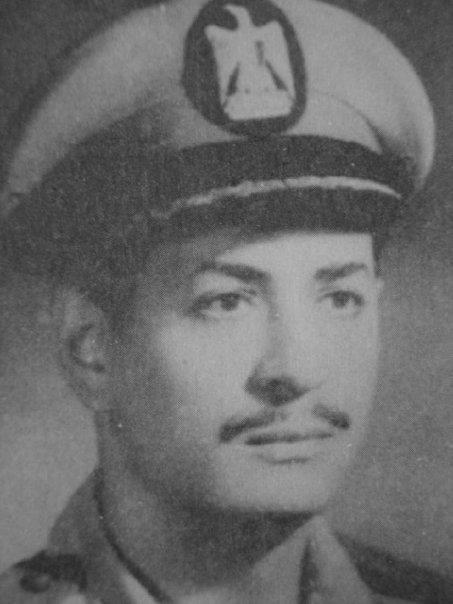
- Afifi in 1973

Governor of Giza Governorate
- In office 20 May 1991 – 20 April 1993
- Preceded by: Omar Abdel-Akher
- Succeeded by: Abdel-Rahim Shehata

Governor of Red Sea Governorate
- In office 1 January 1981 – 20 May 1991
- Preceded by: Ali Othman
- Succeeded by: Salah Mesbah

Personal details
- Born: 2 June 1927 Cairo, Kingdom of Egypt
- Died: 19 June 2026 (aged 99) Cairo, Egypt
- Education: Cairo University (BCom); Egyptian Military College (BA); Frunze Military Academy (AA)
- Occupation: Military officer

Youssef Afifi (Arabic: يوسف عفيفي; 2 June 1927 – 19 June 2026) was an Egyptian politician and army officer. He served as governor of Red Sea Governorate from 1981 to 1991 and governor of Giza Governorate from 1991 to 1993.

Afifi died on 19 June 2026, at the age of 99.
