= Ahmed Ibrahim Darwish =

Egyptian writer and poet (1943–2026)

Ahmed Ibrahim Darwish Muhammad (15 May 1943 – 4 March 2026) was an Egyptian writer and poet.

== Life and work ==
Darwish was born in Cairo on 15 May 1943. He received a bachelor's degree in Arabic language, literature and Islamic sciences from the Faculty of Dar al-Uloom at Cairo University in 1967, and a master's degree in rhetorical and critical studies from Cairo University in 1972. He also received a Ph.D. in Arts and Humanities from the Sorbonne University in Paris in 1982.

Throughout his career, he published 25 books related to Arabic literature and poetry.

Darwish died on 4 March 2026, at the age of 83.

== Awards ==
- State Appreciation Award in Literature from the Supreme Council of Culture, 2008.
