= Murad Wahba =

Egyptian writer and philosopher (1926–2026)

Murad Wahba Gibran (Arabic: مراد وهبه جبران; 13 October 1926 – 7 January 2026) was an Egyptian writer, philosopher and academic.

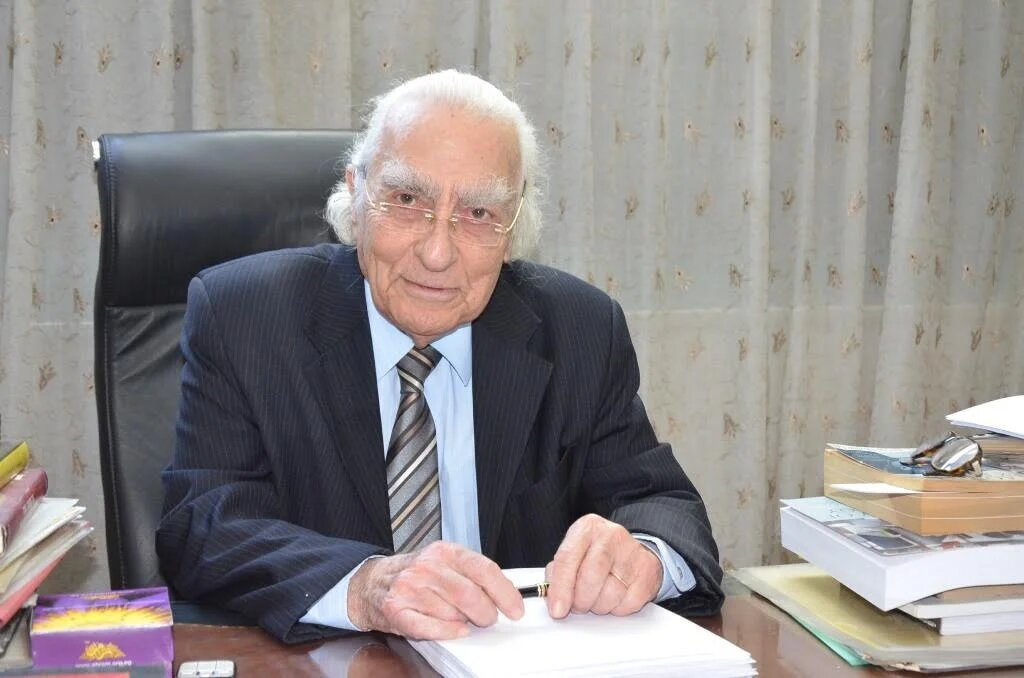
Murad Wahba

== Life and career ==
Gibran studied philosophy at Cairo and Ain Shams universities, and received his doctorate from Alexandria University. He worked as a professor and professor of philosophy at Ain Shams University and a member of a group of prestigious international academies and organisations, and he was the founder and president of The International Society of Ibn Rushd and Enlightenment in 1994.

Throughout his career, he published a number of works, including The Philosophical Dictionary.

Wahba died on 7 January 2026, at the age of 99.
