= Ibrahim Shika =

Egyptian footballer (1997–2025)

Personal information
- Date of birth: 27 February 1997
- Place of birth: Giza Governorate, Egypt
- Date of death: 12 April 2025 (aged 28)
- Place of death: Cairo, Egypt

Senior career*
Years	Team	Apps	(Gls)
- Zamalek
- * Club domestic league appearances and goals

Ibrahim El-Gamal (Arabic: إبراهيم الجمال); 27 February 1997 – 12 April 2025), known as Ibrahim Shika (Arabic: براهيم شيكا), was an Egyptian footballer, best known for his career with Egypt's Zamalek SC, where he played as a left-back. Shika began his football journey in Zamalek's youth academy, excelling in the junior ranks before facing health challenges that forced him to retire early due to a diagnosis of rectal cancer.

== Early life ==
Ibrahim Shika was born in Giza Governorate, Egypt, on 27 February 1997. Raised in a sports-oriented environment, he developed a passion for football at a young age. He joined Zamalek's youth academy during childhood, where he showcased promising talent as a left-back, earning the nickname "Shika" due to comparisons with the playing style of Mahmoud Abdel Razek "Shikabala," Zamalek's captain.

== Career ==
Shika started his professional career with Zamalek, shining in the youth teams alongside players like Mostafa Mohamed and Akram Tawfik. His performances made him a candidate for the senior team, but he left the club at the age of 19 following a dispute with a club official. After leaving Zamalek, Shika joined Al Mokawloon Al Arab, and later played for Tala'ea El Gaish. He was also called up to Egypt's U-20 national team (born 1997) under coach Moatamed Gamal. He temporarily stepped away from football after his mother's death but later returned to compete with second- and third-division clubs before being forced to retire permanently due to his illness.

== Illness and death ==
Ibrahim Shika died after a prolonged battle with rectal cancer in Cairo, on the morning of 12 April 2025, at the age of 28.
