= Ramses Exchange fire =

Fire at Ramses Central building in Cairo

Coordinates: 30°03′18″N 31°14′24″E

Ramses Exchange Fire
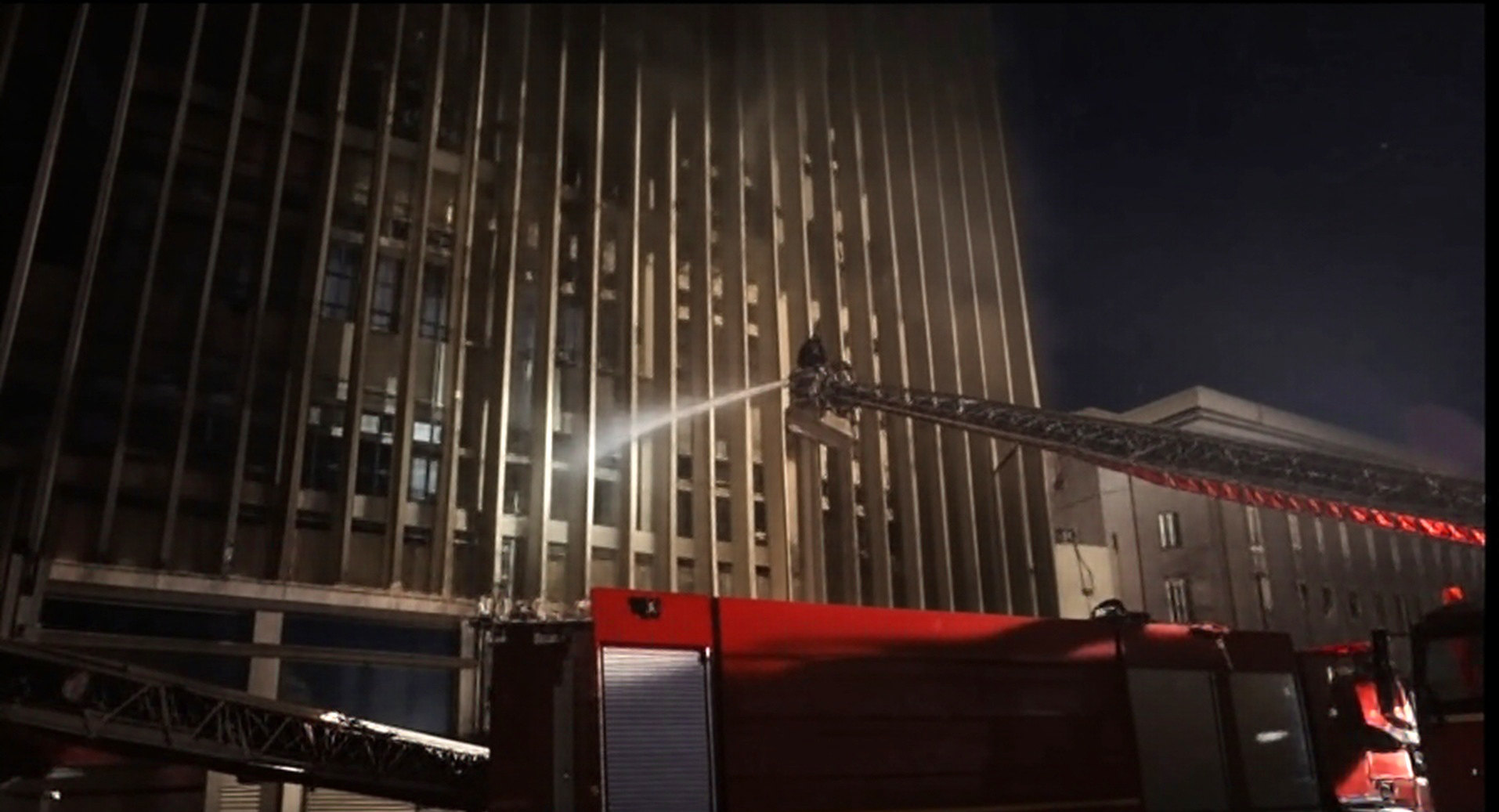
- Firefighters extinguishing the fire
- Date: 7 July 2025
- Location: Cairo, Egypt
- Type: Fire
- Cause: Suspected electrical short circuit (under investigation)
- Deaths: 4
- Injuries: 27
- Property damage: Major telecommunications and infrastructure damage

The Ramses Exchange fire was a significant fire that broke out on 7 July 2025 in the Ramses Exchange Central building, a major telecommunications hub located in downtown Cairo, Egypt. The incident caused substantial human and material losses and disrupted telecommunications services in several areas, making it a major event affecting the country's infrastructure and local community. Another fire broke out on 10 July 2025.

== Incident ==
The fire erupted in administrative offices on the seventh floor of the ten-story Ramses Central building on the afternoon of Monday, 7 July 2025, at approximately 17:25 EEST. Local emergency services received reports from residents, and civil protection and firefighting units were dispatched to the site.

The fire continued for about 13 hours, requiring support from Cairo's water utility company and necessitating the shutdown of electricity and natural gas to the building. The National Telecom Regulatory Authority began efforts to gradually restore affected services in the hours following the incident.

== Casualties ==
According to Egypt's Ministry of Health, the fire resulted in the deaths of four employees working in the building, and injured 27 others, who were transported to nearby hospitals.

The blaze severely damaged critical telecom cables and servers within the building, resulting in widespread telecommunications and internet outages across parts of Cairo and Giza. Internet connectivity was reported to have dropped by 62% nationwide, according to NetBlocks.

=== Financial and business impact ===
The Central Bank of Egypt responded to the incident by raising the cash withdrawal limit to E£500,000. The Egyptian Exchange also suspended trading completely on Tuesday due to "severe disruption affecting the trading system."

== Cause ==
Initial reports suggest the fire may have been caused by an electrical short circuit, particularly given the extreme heat at the time. However, no official cause has been confirmed, and investigations are ongoing.

== Reactions ==
The Egyptian parliament held an emergency session to review the incident. Several MPs criticized the government, with Minister of Parliamentary Affairs Mahmoud Fawzy Abdel Bari providing a detailed briefing on the building's structure and emergency response. Lawmakers also offered condolences and called for accountability.

Nazir Ayad, Grand Mufti of Egypt and Secretary-General of the General Secretariat for Fatwa Authorities Worldwide, offered condolences.
