= Hoda Al-Ajimi =

Egyptian broadcaster (1936–2025)

Hoda Al-Ajimi (Arabic: هدى العجيمي; 24 July 1936 – 5 June 2025) was an Egyptian radio presenter.

== Life and career ==
Al-Ajimi was born on 24 July 1936 in Port Said, she joined the Faculty of Arts, Department of Arabic Language, Cairo University. During her radio career, her programming was focused on women's issues, with a show titled إلى ربات البيوت (to housewives).

Al-Ajimi died on 5 June 2025, at the age of 88.
