= Salah Montaser =

Egyptian writer and journalist (1933–2022)

- Born: 6 August 1933; Egypt
- Died: 15 May 2022 (aged 88)
- Citizenship: Egypt
- Occupation: Journalist

Salah Montaser (Arabic: صلاح منتصر; 6 August 1933 – 15 May 2022) was an Egyptian writer and journalist for Al-Ahram newspaper, and the owner of a daily column entitled ‘Just an Opinion.’ Among the most famous columns is ‘You Are the Master of Your Decision’ assessed for high school, which calls for smoking cessation. He adopted a campaign against smoking and he focused on that in his daily column every February, coinciding with the World Anti-Smoking Day. He was also a member of the Shura Council, a member of the Supreme Council of the Press in Egypt, and Chairman of the Board of Directors of the Arab Media Center. Montaser was born and raised in Damietta, Egypt. He joined the Faculty of Law and became a friend of the late Egyptian writer Abdel Wahab Mutawa. Montaser then worked with the great professor Hassanein Heikal as a journalist at Al-Ahram Foundation until he reached the highest levels of journalism, then began writing his prominent column ‘Just An Opinion’, which he became famous for during the past years. In addition, Montaser was a member of the Rotary Club, editor-in-chief of October magazine, and chairman of the board of directors of Dar Al Maaref for printing and publishing.

== Works ==
His works include the following:

- Tawfiq Al-Hakim in his last testimony, Al-Ahram Center for Translation and Publishing, 1996
- The People Sit on The Throne, General Book Authority, 1997
- Speech in Lost Time, The Family Library, 1999
- Those Who Changed the Twentieth Century, Al-Ahram Center for Translation and Publishing, 2000.
- From Orabi to Abdel Nasser: A New Reading of History, Dar Al-Shorouk, 2005
- Tales of Days, Egyptian General Book Authority, 2008
- Omar's Stories
- Mubarak from Ascending to the Top to Falling to the Abyss
- Good Morning Country, Egyptian General Book Authority, 2010
- My Journey to the End of the World, Al-Ahram Center for Translation and Publishing, 2011
- Rise and Fall from Podium to Court, Al-Masry Foundation for Press, Printing, Publishing, Advertising and Distribution, 2011
