= Said Kamal =

Palestinian politician (1938–2017)

- Born: 23 September 1938; Nablus, Mandatory Palestine
- Died: 25 March 2017 (aged 78); Cairo, Egypt
- Education: Alexandria University
- Movement: Palestine Liberation Organization

Said Kamal (1938–2017) was a Palestinian politician who served as the representative of the Palestine Liberation Organization (PLO) to Egypt. He held other posts in the PLO and was a member of the Palestinian National Council.

== Early life and education ==
Kamal was born in Nablus, Mandatory Palestine, on 23 September 1938. He graduated from An Najah College in Nablus in 1956. Then he attended the University of Baghdad, Iraq, in 1958, but he could not manage to complete his studies in economics and political science due to the military coup which ended the monarchy. He settled in Egypt where he received a degree in economics and political science at Alexandria University in 1966. He joined the General Union of Palestinian Students (GUPS) and was the chairman of its branch at Alexandria University between 1959 and 1962. Then he was elected as a member of the executive committee of the GUPS which he held until 1969.

== Career ==
Kamal was one of the founding members of the PLO. He acted as the head of its Popular Tanzim Department in Cairo until 1970. He served in the PLO's political department between 1970 and 1988. He was its vice-chairman from 1974. He was made the representative of the PLO to Egypt in 1988, being the first Palestinian official to hold the post. His tenure ended in 1994. Then he served as assistant secretary general of the Arab League in charge of the Palestine affairs between 1994 and 2005. He also served as a member of the Palestinian National Council.

== Death ==
Kamal died in Cairo on 25 March 2017.
