= Fatma Sarhan =

Egyptian singer and actress (1928–2026)

Fatma Sarhan (Arabic: فاطمة سرحان; 13 April 1928 – 13 March 2026) was an Egyptian singer and actress.

== Life and career ==
Sarham was born in Basyoun in 1928. She began singing on the radio in the 1950s. She also participated in acting and singing in the films "I am the Doctor" (1968), "The Edge of the Sword" (1986), "Al-Jawaza Di Mash Lazad Tatum" (1988), "Beware of This Woman" (1991) and in the TV drama serial "The Joys of the Dome" (2016).

Sarhan died on 13 March 2026, at the age of 97.

== Awards ==
- Honored by the General Authority for Cultural Palaces.
- Authority's shield in honor of her role in documenting folklore on 10 May 2015.
