= Abu Minqar =

Abu Minqar قصر أبو منقار
- Abu Minqar

- Location in Egypt
- Coordinates: 26°30′20″N 27°39′28″E
- Country: Egypt
- Governorate: New Valley Governorate
- Time zone: UTC+2 (EET)
  - Summer (DST): UTC+3 (EEST)

Abu Minqar (Arabic: قصر أبو منقار) is an oasis town in Qesm Al Wahat Ad Dakhlah District, New Valley Governorate, Egypt, about 93 kilometres (58 mi) by road southwest of Farafra. It is inhabited mainly by Bedouins and lies along a historical caravan route to Kufra, Libya.

== History and archaeology ==
Abu Minqar lay on the very edge of Roman Egypt. There are still probable traces of the Romans in the area, including two ruined brick buildings and two well shafts.

The German explorer Friedrich Gerhard Rohlfs explored the Abu Minqar area and surrounding desert of western Egypt in 1874-1875, and in 1898 it was explored by Wilfred Jennings-Bramly and W. J. Harding King.

In the area is the Valley of Shells (Wadi el-Khawaka), which is known for its prehistoric sea-shells. A potsherd with plant imprints of the Panicum turgidum species dated to between 5716 and 46 BC has been unearthed at a middle Holocene site near Abu Minqar.

== Geography and geology ==
Abu Minqar lies in the eastern Sahara desert of western-central Egypt, 206 kilometres (128 mi) by road northwest of Mut (Dakhla) and about 93 kilometres (58 mi) by road southwest of Farafra, along a historical caravan route to Kufra, Libya.

Geologically, the area forms part of the Dakhla—Abu Minqar plateau in a shallow depression between the Kharga and Dakhla depressions, with an elevation typically between 400 and 500 metres above sea level. The Abu Minqar Depression is often considered to be the extreme western subdivision of the Dakhla Depression. Maastrichtian-Danian period sediments are found at Abu Minqar.
