= Capital punishment in Egypt =

Capital punishment is a legal penalty in Egypt. The state carried out at least 44 executions in 2016, at least 35 in 2017, and at least 43 in 2018, according to Amnesty International. The method of execution is hanging for civilian convictions, and by firing squad for convictions by commissioned military personnel at the time of duty.

The Grand Mufti of Egypt Shawki Ibrahim Abdel-Karim Allam, is responsible under Egyptian law for reviewing all death sentences in Egypt. Legally, his opinion is consultative and not binding on the presiding court that handed down the death sentence.

== Venues ==
Executions by hanging have generally been carried out at the Cairo Central Prison. However prisons of Wadi Al Natrun and Burj Al Arab both house an execution chamber.

== Port Said Stadium disaster ==
On 26 January 2013, an Egyptian court gave death sentences to 21 people convicted of involvement in a mass attack by fans of the Al-Masry Club against fans of the Al-Ahly Sports Club at Port Said Stadium on 1 February 2012. At least 72 people died in violence that erupted in Port Said, Egypt, during the Port Said Stadium disaster. A retrial was ordered on 6 February 2014 and the number sentenced to death was reduced to 11 on 19 April 2015.

== 2014 mass trials ==
Amid political unrest following the July 2013 removal of Mohamed Morsi from presidential office (which itself occurred following mass protests against his rule), a court sentenced 683 suspected Muslim Brotherhood members to death on 28 April 2014, including the group's supreme guide, Mohammed Badie, and confirmed the death sentences of 37 of 529 alleged supporters previously condemned. The defendants were accused of violence at two sit-ins in Cairo, held by supporters of Morsi, where the police conducted sit-in dispersals on 14 August 2013. Mohamed Elmessiry, an Amnesty International researcher monitoring the cases, said that they "lacked basic fair trial guarantees". The defendants from the first case whose death sentences were not upheld were each sentenced to 25 years in prison.

Judge Saeed Youssef first attracted international condemnation and prompted an outcry from foreign human rights groups after he handed down the initial sentence for the 529 defendants on March 24, following a brief trial perceived as having been marked by irregularities. Later, he reversed 492 of those 529 death sentences, commuting most of them to life in prison.

Egyptian law requires that death sentences be confirmed by the presiding judge after reviewing the opinion of the Grand Mufti of Egypt, the country's leading official legal expert on religious matters. The Mufti's opinion to the judge is confidential. The guilty verdict and death sentences are still subject to review by appellate courts. "The case killed the credibility of the Egyptian judicial system," said Elmessiry of Amnesty International.

== 2020 mass executions ==
Amnesty International accused Egyptian authorities of executing 57 people in October and November alone, nearly double the number recorded in the whole of 2019. Amnesty said the spike in executions followed a botched breakout attempt in September at the Tora Prison in Cairo. Four police officers and four death-row prisoners died in the attempt.

Amnesty International's annual global review of death penalty usage ranked Egypt as the world's third most frequent executioner in 2020. Egypt executed at least 107 people in 2020 following trials that Amnesty International has called "grossly unfair" and confessions perceived as forced, as lawyers could not meet their clients or conduct proper investigations due to the impact of the ongoing COVID-19 pandemic.

== September 2020 death sentences ==
On 8 September 2020, a court in Egypt sentenced 75 people to death and 47 others to life imprisonment. They were charged with murder or membership in a terrorist group. The British newspaper The Independent has reported that Najia Bounaim of Amnesty International's Middle East and North Africa division described the court's sentence as "disgraceful" and "a mockery of justice".

== September 2026 death sentences ==
On 5 September 2026, a court in Cairo sentenced twelve people to death, including television presenter and businesswoman Sarah Khalifa on charges related to drug trafficking.
