= MENA (cable system) =

Cable system

MENA Submarine Cable System
- Cable type: Fibre-optic
- Construction finished: 2014
- First traffic: November 2014
- Owner(s): Telecom Egypt
- Website: Official website

Middle East North Africa (MENA) is a submarine communications cable system that is planned to connect Italy, Greece, Egypt, Saudi Arabia, Oman, and India. It will be about 9,000 kilometres (5,600 mi) long and is planned to deliver up to 5.76 terabits per second.

In 2018, Telecom Egypt announced its acquisition of the cable from Orascom Telecom Media and Technology Holding.

== Cable landing stations ==
It will have cable landing points at:

- Mazara, Italy
- Crete, Greece
- Alexandria, Egypt

Then overland to

- Za'frana, Egypt

Then onwards as a submarine cable again to

- Jeddah, Saudi Arabia
- Seeb, Oman
- Mumbai, India

Total length of the Cable is 9,100 kilometres (5,700 mi).
