= 2022 Men's Africa Hockey5s World Cup Qualifier =

Men's field hockey 5s tournament

1st Hockey5s African cup of nations
Tournament details
- Host country: Egypt
- City: Ismailia
- Dates: 10 December 2022–15 December 2022
- Venue: Suez Canal Authority Stadium

Final positions
- Champions: Egypt
- Runner-up: Nigeria
- Third place: Kenya

Tournament statistics
- Matches played: 12
- Goals scored: 83 (6.92 per match)
- Top scorer: (Nigeria) Peter John (11 goals)

The 1st Africa Hockey5s World Cup Qualifier was the first edition of the Africa Hockey5s World Cup Qualifier for the men's Hockey5s event at the FIH Hockey5s World Cup. It was held alongside the women's tournament in Ismailia, Egypt from 10–15 December 2022.

The winner of the tournament qualified for the 2024 Hockey5s World Cup.

== Teams ==
- Nigeria
- Kenya
- South Africa
- Zambia
- Egypt

== Results ==
Pos	Team	Pld	W	D	L	GF	GA	GD	Pts	Qualification
1	Egypt (H)	4	4	0	0	23	8	+15	12	Final
2	Nigeria	4	2	1	1	19	18	+1	7	Final
3	Zambia	4	1	2	1	12	11	+1	5	3rd place match
4	Kenya	4	1	0	3	6	17	−11	3	3rd place match
5	South Africa	4	0	1	3	10	16	−6	1	

Source: FIH
Rules for classification: 1) points; 2) matches won; 3) goal difference; 4) goals for; 5) head-to-head result; 6) field goals for.
(H) Hosts

11 December 2022
12:00

Kenya	0–5 (Note: The match resulted in a walkover, after the Kenyan team arrived late and did not made it in time for the game.)	Zambia
	Report

Umpires:
Kofi Quagraine (GHA)
Simon Awasa (NGR)

11 December 2022
13:00

Nigeria	5–4	South Africa
P. John 3', 12', 14', 18'; M. John 13'	Report	Kelly-Stack 7'; Campbell 12', 12'; Walstoom 15'

Umpires:
Sedtric Makati (NAM)
Haitham Selim (EGY)

11 December 2022
15:00

Egypt	4–0	Zambia
Ghobran 11'; El-Naggar 15'; El-Ganaini 18', 19'	Report

Umpires:
Kofi Quagraine (GHA)
Titus Ngolia (KEN)

12 December 2022
11:00

Nigeria	4–2	Kenya
P. John 3', 5', 14', 18'	Report	Masambu 4'; Mungai 5'

Umpires:
Kofi Quagraine (GHA)
Haitham Selim (EGY)

12 December 2022
12:00

South Africa	3–3	Zambia
Campbell 2'; Christoffels 6', 9'	Report	Mubanga 10'; Mpande 18', 20'

Umpires:
Titus Ngolia (KEN)
Kofi Quagraine (GHA)

12 December 2022
13:00

Egypt	6–1	Kenya
El-Ganaini 2', 20'; Ragab 5'; Ragab 10', 15'; El-Naggar 19'	Report	Ogenche 14'

Umpires:
Sedtric Makati (NAM)
Simon Awasa (NGR)

13 December 2022
12:00

Egypt	5–1	South Africa
El-Ganaini 2', 13', 17'; El-Naggar 18'; Ragab 20'	Report	Campbell 7'

Umpires:
Sedtric Makati (NAM)
Simon Awasa (NGR)

13 December 2022
13:00

Zambia	4–4	Nigeria
Jere 2'; Mubanga 4'; Mulenga 4'; Katele 5'	Report	Solomon 4', 20'; M. John 4'; P. John 4'

Umpires:
Titus Ngolia (KEN)
Haitham Selim (EGY)

13 December 2022
15:00

South Africa	2–3	Kenya
Posthumus 11'; Walstoom 20'	Report	Wabwire 11'; Mungai 16'; Ludiali 17'

Umpires:
Abraham Chaya (ZAM)
Haitham Selim (EGY)

13 December 2022
16:00

Nigeria	6–8	Egypt
Solomon 5', 7', 7', 17', 19'; P. John 20'	Report	El-Naggar 2'; Ghobran 8'; Ragab 10', 15'; El-Ganaini 12', 17'; Ragab 13'; Atef 16'

Umpires:
Kofi Quagraine (GHA)
Sedtric Makati (NAM)

=== Third place game ===
15 December 2022
12:00

Zambia	2–5	Kenya
Katele 9'; Bwalya 14'	Report	Ludiali 3'; Masambu 6', 8'; Wabwire 12'; Ogenche 14'

Umpires:
Haitham Selim (EGY)
Sedtric Makati (NAM)

=== Final ===
15 December 2022
14:00

Egypt	9–2	Nigeria
Sayed 2', 10', 20'; Ragab 4', 12'; Ghobran 6', 18'; El-Naggar 9'; El-Ganaini 20'	Report	Ibrahim 11'; Samaila 19'

Umpires:
Kofi Quagraine (GHA)
Titus Ngolia (KEN)

== Goalscorers ==
There were 83 goals scored in 12 matches, for an average of 6.92 goals per match.

11 goals

- (Nigeria) Peter John

10 goals

- (Egypt) Ahmed El-Ganaini

7 goals

- (Nigeria) Denis Solomon

6 goals

- (Egypt) Mostafa Ragab

5 goals

- (Egypt) Ahmed El-Naggar

4 goals

- (Egypt) Hossam Ghobran
- (South Africa) Jared Campbell

3 goals

- (Egypt) Hossameldin Ragab
- (Egypt) Amr Sayed
- (Kenya) Bethuel Masambu

2 goals

- (Kenya) Ivan Ludiali
- (Kenya) Moses Mungai
- (Kenya) Brian Ogenche
- (Kenya) Danstone Wabwire
- (South Africa) Winray Christoffels
- (South Africa) Angelo Walstoom
- (Zambia) Shadrick Katele
- (Zambia) Alfred Mpande
- (Zambia) Joseph Mubanga

1 goal

- (Egypt) Karim Atef
- (Nigeria) Benjamin Ibrahim
- (Nigeria) Michael John
- (Nigeria) James Samaila
- (South Africa) Taylor Kelly-Stack
- (South Africa) Cody Posthumus
- (Zambia) Gift Bwalya
- (Zambia) George Jere
- (Zambia) Dominic Mulenga

Source: FIH

== Final standing ==
Rank	Team
1st place, gold medalist(s)	Egypt
2nd place, silver medalist(s)	Nigeria
3rd place, bronze medalist(s)	Kenya
4	Zambia
5	South Africa

== See also ==
- 2022 Women's Africa Hockey5s World Cup Qualifier
