= Sarah Khalifa =

Egyptian influencer

- سارة خليفة
- Born: (Note: Al-Ahram's reporter Ahmed Reda wrote a note saying that Khalifa's age is disputed, with sources differing in her age. Some give her date of birth as 29 March 1994, which would make her 32 years old at the time of the sentencing, while other outlets describe her as a 39-year-old, including The Jerusalem Post and Entertainment Weekly.); Cairo, Egypt
- Occupations: Entrepreneur, businesswoman
- Spouse: Kahraba (m. 2016; div. 2016)
- Status: Incarcerated
- Conviction: Guilty on all counts
- Criminal charges: Drug trafficking; Sexual assault
- Penalty: Death (drug trafficking); 5 years in prison (sexual assault)

Sarah Khalifa (Note: Pronunciation: Arabic: سارة خليفة, romanized: Sāra Ḫalīfa) is an Egyptian influencer, entrepreneur and former television presenter.

On 5 September 2026, she was sentenced to death by a court in Cairo on charges related to drug trafficking and received an additional prison sentence for the sexual assault of a young man.

== Career ==
Khalifa was born in Cairo on 29 March 1994 and began her career in entertainment journalism working for the Arab Radio and Television Network (ART) for several years. She also took part in programming aired on Al Sharqiya, an Iraqi television station. In 2024, Khalifa co-hosted a streaming programme on YouTube along with singer Hamo Beka, featuring interviews with celebrities from Egyptian media and society.

Khalifa rose to prominence when she hosted the crime and security show Mission Impossible on Mehwar TV. (Note: In Arabic: مهمة صعبة, romanized: Mohemma Saaba, literally "Difficult Mission" or "Hard Mission".) The programme included interviews with police officers, security officials and crime suspects.

By 2025, Khalifa relied heavily on her business career and other media-related activities. She also owns a cosmetic surgery clinic in Cairo and an event planning company. Khalifa has more than 2.5 million followers on Instagram, making her a renowned personality within Egyptian media and being considered a lifestyle influencer.

== Criminal prosecution ==
=== Drug trafficking case ===
Khalifa was arrested in Cairo in April 2025, accused of being part of a drug trafficking network that imported raw materials to produce synthetic drugs in the country. She was also charged with a count related to the sexual assault of a young man. In the same operative, the Egyptian National Police arrested dozens of other individuals who were accused of taking part in these activities. The prosecution presented evidence in the trial that included more than 750 kilograms of narcotics that were seized by police during the investigation. Khalifa wept while giving testimony before the judges, asking for "mercy and humanity."

During her trial in mid-2026, Khalifa denied the charges and said that she had never seen any drugs until she was photographed by their side after her arrest in April 2025. In August 2026, the court found her and twenty others guilty of drug trafficking, referring a request of opinion to the country's Grand Mufti on whether a death sentence should be handed down.

On 5 September 2026, upon receiving the Grand Mufti's advice, the court sentenced Khalifa and eleven other defendants to death by hanging, while nine others were sentenced to life in prison. Among those sentenced to death was Khalifa's brother, Mohamed, who was convicted of involvement in the manufacturing of the materials. Her lawyer stated that they would appeal the verdict to a higher court, and if the appeal is denied, they will file another motion to the Court of Cassation.

=== Sexual assault case ===
Khalifa was additionally sentenced to five years in prison for the kidnapping and sexual assault of a young man who worked as her driver. When she was arrested for the drug trafficking case, investigators found footage in her cell phone showing the youth being stripped naked, assaulted and filmed inside Khalifa's home.

== Personal life ==
Khalifa was married to footballer Kahraba in 2016, divorcing six months later.
