= Egyptian State Lawsuits Authority =

- هيئة قضايا الدولة

Agency overview
- Formed: 1875
- Jurisdiction: Ministry of Justice, Arab Republic of Egypt
- Agency executive: Councilor Hussein Abdo Khalil
- Parent department: Public Administration Sector Gameat Al Dewal Al Arabeya Street, Mohandessin, Giza
- Website: Official website of State Lawsuits Authority

The Egyptian State Lawsuits Authority is an Egyptian judicial institution. It was established in 1874 prior to the establishment of the Egyptian national courts in 1883. It represents the interests of the state in a variety of areas before national and international courts and arbitral tribunals. The Egyptian State Lawsuits Authority is legally mandated to proceed to plead on behalf of the state without needing the state's request or permission. Its stated aim is to defend public funds and the interests of the Egyptian people.

== Structure ==
The Egyptian State Lawsuits Authority is divided into several departments, each of which is competent to represent the state before a specified kind of court with respect to jurisdiction. All the departments are headed by their respective vice presidents, although the Department of Foreign Disputes is always headed by the president of the Authority.

== Department of Foreign Disputes ==
The members of the Department of Foreign Disputes are in charge of representing the Arab Republic of Egypt before the International Court of Justice (ICJ), International Centre for Settlement of Investment Disputes (ICSID), Cairo Regional Centre for International Commercial Arbitration (CRCICA), International Chamber of Commerce in Paris (ICC) and any other international arbitral or judicial panel for the settlement of International Disputes where Egypt is a party thereto. The current State Solicitor Asser Harb is primarily known for his eminent international legal practice within the Department of Foreign Disputes.

== See also ==
- Egyptian Judicial System
- Egyptian Civil Code
