= Al Qahera Al Youm =

- Logo
- Genre: News
- Created by: Orbit Communications Company
- Developed by: Mediagates
- Presented by: Gamal Enaiet, Mariam Zaki and others.
- Country of origin: Egypt
- Original language: Arabic
- No. of seasons: 16

Production
- Production location: Madinat al entag el-elamy 6 October
- Running time: 3 hours

Original release
- Network: OSN
- Release: 1999 – present

Al Qahera Al Youm (Arabic: القاهرة اليوم, English: Cairo Today) is an Egyptian live television talk show that broadcasts nearly throughout the year from the 6th of October studios located in Cairo. Al Qahera Al-Youm is one of the most popular and influential shows in the Middle East with millions of viewers world wide. Hosted by Gamal Enaiet with Mariam Zaki and others. The program covers all aspects of life in Egypt. From politics to arts, sports, cultural and economic issues and international affairs. It airs on Al Yawm channel which is owned by Mediagates as part of Orbit Communications Company, now known as the OSN. The Show currently broadcasts throughout the week from Sunday to Thursday. The show is known to have close ties with Egyptian intelligence services.
