= Cairo Regional Internet Exchange =

- Full name: Cairo Regional Internet Exchange
- Abbreviation: CRIX
- Location: Egypt

The Cairo Regional Internet Exchange (CRIX) is an Internet Exchange Point which was formed in Cairo, Egypt by a joint venture between the National Telecom Company (NTC) and its subsidiary ECC Solutions along with the Indian FLAG Telecom. The exchange was officially inaugurated in Cairo on December 18, 2002 by the then Minister of Communications & Information Technology, later Prime Minister Ahmed Nazif.

CRIX is the central peering point for local and regional Internet service providers (ISPs) in Egypt and the Middle East. Its purpose is to efficiently route all intra-Regional Internet traffic among the operators without having to pass through the United States or Europe. This allows the regional data carriers to significantly optimize upstream capacity costs, enhance their existing bandwidth capacities and reduce the size of the routing tables worldwide. CRIX is hosted by ECC at its data center.

A 2005 report for the Arab Telecommunications and Information Council of Ministers concluded that the exchange was being under-utilized and that there was no real peering between Arab countries.

== See also ==
- List of Internet exchange points
