= List of rail accidents in Egypt =

This list of rail accidents in Egypt provides details of significant railway crashes in Egypt involving railway rolling stocks.

== List ==
Date	Killed	Injured	Type	Details
April 29, 1931	48	0	fire	The rear cars of a passenger train from Alexandria to Cairo, crowded with passengers due to the Eid al-Adha holiday, caught fire on the approach to Benha station. Many passengers jumped from the moving train rather than waiting for the station. Altogether 48 people are killed.
January 30, 1954	28	Many	Run over	People awaiting the arrival of President Mohammed Naguib's train on a visit to Ibyar and Kafr El Zayat station pressed forward onto the track where a Cairo to Alexandria express was approaching; 28 were killed, including three policemen, and many injured.
March 23, 1956	0	Hundreds	Derailment	A speeding express train of the Egyptian state railways plunged into a deep canal near Maghagha in southern Egypt, with hundreds of injuries reported.
September 8, 1977	25–70	0	Derailment	As an 11-car Cairo to Aswan express passed Asyut at about 70 mph (110 km/h), eight cars derailed. Newspaper reports showed 70 people killed, but official sources listed only 25.
June 10, 1983	22	46	Collision	One train crashed into the rear of another south of Cairo, and ended up with a baggage car standing vertically on its end that was crushed between the locomotive and the first passenger car. At least 22 people were killed in the accident and 46 injured.
June 18, 1985	10	14	Collision	Two trains crashed into each other near Qena
December 11, 1987	62	67	Collision	A bus carrying primary school children returning from the Giza Zoo was smashed by a high-speed train at an unmarked railroad level crossing at Ain Shams, on the outskirts of Cairo, killing 62 children and injuring 67.
December 22, 1995	75	76	Collision	Witnesses in Badrashin said an early morning train heading from Cairo to Beni Suef crashed into another train heading from behind heading to Aswan
February 3, 1997	11	10	Collision	Two trains crashed into each other 60 miles north of Aswan
October 19, 1998	50	100	Derailment	A train derails as it enters a station at high speed at Kafr El Dawwar south of Alexandria
February 20, 2002	383	0	fire	2002 El Ayyat railway accident A train packed to double capacity catches fire, killing 383 people.
August 21, 2006	57	128	Collision	Qalyoub train collision – Two trains collided in Qalyoub, 12 miles (20 kilometers) north of Cairo, killing 57 people and injuring 128.
September 4, 2006	5	30	Collision	A passenger train collided with a freight train north of Cairo, killing five people and injuring 30.
July 16, 2008	44	33	Collision	At least 44 people were killed and 33 injured when a truck failed to stop at a level crossing and pushed two vehicles into a Matruh–Alexandria passenger train, at El Dabaa, Marsa Matruh.
October 24, 2009	18	0	Collision	2009 El Ayyat railway accident – A passenger train was stopped after striking a water buffalo in the El Ayyat area of Giza. Another passenger train, travelling in the same direction, later ran into the back of the stationary train, resulting in the deaths of at least 18 people.
July 17, 2012		15	Derailment	A passenger train struck wooden planks and chunks of metal put down by people to cross the tracks and derailed at Giza, injuring fifteen passengers.
November 17, 2012	51	12	Collision	Manfalut railway accident – A school bus carrying about 60 pre-school children was hit by a train near Manfalut, 350 km (230 miles) south of Cairo. At least 50 children and the bus driver died; more than a dozen people were injured. The Egyptian minister of transport, Mohamed Rashad Al Matini, resigned.
January 15, 2013	19	230	Collision	Badrashin railway accident – A passenger train derailed at Giza and collided with a freight train. Nineteen people died and 230 were injured.
January 31, 2016	7	0	Collision	Seven were killed and scores injured when a train crashed into a truck in Giza. Reports said the gatekeeper forgot about the coming passenger train until a truck pulled out in front of the crossing.
August 11, 2017	41	179	Collision	Alexandria train collision: Two trains collided near Alexandria. 41 people were killed and 179 injured.
February 28, 2018	15	Dozens	Collision	A head-on crash between two trains killed at least 15 people and injured dozens more near Cairo.
February 27, 2019	25	50	Collision	Ramses Station rail disaster: A train smashed into a barrier inside Ramses Station, causing a major explosion and a fire. More than 25 people died and at least 50 others were injured.
March 26, 2021	18	200	Collision	Sohag train collision: A passenger train ran into the rear of another near Sohag. At least 18 were killed, 200 injured. The prosecutor ordered the arrest of 8 rail officials.
April 15, 2021	0	15	Derailment	Two cars of a passenger train, from Cairo to Mansoura, derailed at Minya al-Qamh. Fifteen people were injured.
April 18, 2021	23	139	Derailment	Toukh train accident: Four carriages of a passenger train, from Cairo to Mansoura, derailed in Toukh. 23 people were killed and 139 were injured.
April 27, 2021	1	3	Collision	Train no. 115, travelling from Ismailia to Suez, crashed into a pickup truck towing a trailer and loaded with bricks at a level crossing in Suez’s Al-Amer village. A technician was in detention for investigation.
June 23, 2022	1	0	Derailment	A freight train going from El-Salam to El-Bostan derailed, killing one.
March 7, 2023	2	16	Derailment	Two people were killed and 16 others injured after a passenger train crashed into a station platform in Qalyub.
August 21, 2024	2	0	Collision	Two people are killed in a level-crossing collision between a train and a truck in Borg El Arab, Alexandria Governorate.
September 14, 2024	At least 2	At least 29	Two trains collided	At least two killed, 29 injured, when two trains collided in Zagazig.
October 13, 2024	At least 2	At least 21	Two trains collided	At least two killed, 21 injured, when two trains collided in Minya.
March 13, 2025	At least 12	At least 8	Collision	A train collides with a minibus at an unauthorized crossing in Ismailia Governorate, killing eight people.
August 30, 2025	3	At least 94	Derailment	A passenger train traveling from Matrouh Governorate to Cairo derails in the west of the country, killing three people and injuring 94 others.
November 8, 2026	7	125	Collision	2026 El Ayyat train collision: A train travelling between Giza and Faiyum collided rear-end into another train that was stationary travelling from Cairo to Aswan.

== Sources ==
- Semmens, Peter (1994). Railway Disasters of the World: Principal Passenger Train Accidents of the 20th Century. Patrick Stephens Ltd. ISBN 1-85260-323-2.
- Haine, Edgar A. (1993). Railroad wrecks. Associated University Presses. ISBN 978-0-8453-4844-4.
