= El Ayyat railway accident =

El Ayyat railway accident may refer to:

- 2002 El Ayyat railway accident
- 2009 El Ayyat railway accident
- 2026 El Ayyat train collision
