= List of fires in Egypt =

This is a list of major structural fires in Egypt. It includes fires with one or more confirmed fatalities in a workplace or other public place (e.g., trains), or that result in the loss of the building.

Fire inspections and regulatory enforcement are lax in Egypt, especially since the 2011 Egyptian revolution, so large and deadly fires are somewhat more common than usual. The government of Egypt said that there were nearly 50,000 reported fires, in which 203 people died and 855 people were injured, during 2022.

== 21st century ==
Fire	Year	Place	Deaths	Notes
Ramses Exchange fire	2025	Cairo	4	38 injured.
Police station fire	2023	Ismailia	0	38 people injured.
Giza church fire	2022	Giza	41	Electrical problem in an air conditioning unit.
Clothing factory fire	2021	Obour	20	Caused by chemicals stored in the basement. Also 24 injuries.
Hospital fire	2021	Kafr El Sheikh	2	Electrical problem in hospital ICU unit caused a fire that killed two patients.
Shoe warehouse	2021	Giza	0	Business was unlicensed. 13-story building engulfed by fire.
Juvenile detention center	2021	Cairo	6	
Hospital fire	2020	Obour	7	Fire in ICU unit.
Hospital fire	2020	Alexandria	7	Fire in the hospital killed seven patients and injured another.
Highway fire	2020	Cairo	0	Cars on a nearby highway set fire to a leaky oil pipeline. 17 people were injured.
Ramses Station rail disaster	2019	Cairo	25	Train derailment, possibly due to brake failure.
Restaurant fire	2015	Cairo	17	Arson by a disgruntled ex-employee. Restaurant had no emergency exits.
Furniture factory fire	2015	Obour	25+	Gas container exploded in an elevator at a factory without safety permits.
Shura Council fire	2008	Cairo	1 killed	A short circuit caused a fire to break out in the afternoon in the Egyptian Shura Council building. 16 people were injured.
Beni Suef Cultural Palace fire	2005	Beni Suef	46	A candle set fire to the stage scenery. Fire extinguishers were not in place, and the theater was overcrowded.
El Ayyat railway fire	2002	near El Ayyat	370+	Fire on board, probably caused by portable cooking gas used by a passenger to heat food, resulted in hundreds of deaths.

== 20th century ==
- Musafirkhana, 1998
- Khedivial Opera House, 1971
