= Mit al-Qadi =

Mit Al-Qa'id
- Administrative unit
- Location of Mit Al-Qa'id in Egypt
- Coordinates: 30.032021°N 31.110449°E
- Country: Egypt
- Governorate: Giza
- Markaz: Al-Ayyat

Population (2006)
  - Total: 9,484
- Time zone: UTC+2 (EET)
  - Summer (DST): UTC+3 (EEST)

Mit Al-Qa'id (Egyptian Arabic: ميت القائد) is a administrative unit belonging to the El Ayyat district in the Giza Governorate, Egypt. According to the 2006 census, the total population of Mit Al-Qa'id was 9,484 people, including 4,971 men and 4,513 women.

== Administrative Division ==
Mit Al-Qa'id includes 6 administrative subdivisions:

- Mit Al-Qa'id
- Kafr Barakat
- Al-Muqatifiya
- Al-Nasiriya
- Manshat Abu Abbas
- Kafr Qasim
