= Giza church fire =

2022 fire in Giza, Egypt

- Date: 14 August 2022
- Venue: Abu Sefein Church, Giza, Egypt
- Location: Giza, Egypt; 30°04′30″N 31°11′13″E
- Type: Fire
- Cause: Short circuit
- Deaths: 41
- Injuries: 45

On 14 August 2022, a fire broke out at the Abu Sefein Church, a Coptic Christian Orthodox church in the Imbaba neighborhood of Giza on the outskirts of Cairo, Egypt. The fire started during Sunday worship services when nearly 5,000 worshippers were gathered. The fire, which investigations found started due to a faulty air-conditioning unit, spread to a nursery the church hosted, killing 41 people in total throughout the complex, including at least 18 children. One of the church's priests, Abdul Masih Bakhit, was among those who died in the fire.

== Background ==
The church is named for Saint Mercurius, known in Arabic and among the worshippers as 'Abu Sefein', and it is one of the largest churches in Giza. Egyptian law strictly regulates construction in churches, historically requiring a presidential decree to gain a building permit. Due to the difficulty in gaining approval for projects, unauthorized construction is widespread, often without following fire safety regulations. It had initially been converted into a church without a permit, though it was retroactively legalized.

Electrical fires occur often in Egypt, where building and inspection standards are inadequate and poorly enforced. Multiple fires have occurred in public areas throughout Egypt, including the 2002 El Ayyat railway fire which resulted in 370 deaths; a 2020 hospital fire that killed seven patients; and the 2021 Cairo clothing factory fire that resulted in 20 deaths.

== Fire ==
The Ministry of Interior said that the fire was caused by a faulty air-conditioning unit on the second floor of the church. According to the Ministry of Health most of the deaths were due to smoke inhalation or being trampled in the stampede to escape the building. The church hosts a nursery in its fourth floor. A neighboring church's priest said that children were taken to higher floors to escape the blaze instead of being evacuated. Eyewitnesses reported that people attempted to jump to safety from the upper floors to escape the fire.

The response time of firefighters to this incident is not clear. The Health Ministry said the first fire truck arrived two minutes after the first reports of a fire were received, however, relatives of those trapped in the church said that paramedics and firefighters were slow in reaching the site, and one witness said it took two hours for a fire truck to arrive. Bystanders reportedly rushed into the church to help evacuate those trapped until the fire's intensity and smoke became too overwhelming. Eyewitnesses reported that the fire began at 8:00 am and lasted for two hours.

== Victims ==
The fire resulted in 41 deaths and 45 non-fatal injuries. Security services reported that at least 18 of the deceased were children. One local hospital's records showed 20 bodies received, among them 10 children, while another local hospital received 21 bodies.

== Investigation ==
The fire's death toll was among the largest in Egypt's recent history, and the country's top prosecutor ordered an investigation into the blaze. While Egypt's Copts have faced discrimination, attacks, and religious violence, both the church authorities and the Egyptian state agencies believe the fire to be accidental.

== Response ==
President Abdel Fattah el-Sisi issued a statement expressing his regret, saying, "I offer my sincere condolences to the families of the innocent victims that have passed on to be with their Lord in one of his houses of worship," Prime Minister Mostafa Madbouly announced that each deceased person's family would be given 100,000 Egyptian pounds (6393.86 USD) in compensation, while those injured would be given up to 20,000 Egyptian pounds (1278.77 USD), and the Minister of Social Solidarity further announced that al-Azhar Mosque and other civil society groups would be offering an additional 50,000 Egyptian pounds (3196.93 USD) to the victims and their families.

Al-Azhar Mosque expressed its condolences, and the grand imam of al-Azhar Ahmed El-Tayeb offered his sympathy to the Coptic pope Tawadros II. Mohamed Salah, captain of the Egypt national football team, also tweeted his condolences, and made a donation of three million Egyptian pounds to help rebuild the church.

== See also ==
- List of fires in Egypt
