= Sohag train collision =

2021 Train collision in Egypt

Details
- Date: 26 March 2021; 11:42 EST (09:42 UTC)
- Location: Tahta district, Sohag Governorate
- Coordinates: 26°44′41″N 31°31′47″E
- Country: Egypt
- Line: Cairo–Aswan Line
- Operator: Egyptian Railway Authority
- Incident type: Collision
- Cause: Intentional triggering of emergency brakes, failure to stop following train

Statistics
- Trains: 2
- Deaths: 18
- Injured: 200

On 26 March 2021, two trains collided in the Tahta district of the Sohag Governorate in Egypt. Eighteen people were killed and at least 200 others were injured. The incident was initiated by an unidentified person or persons intentionally triggering the emergency brakes on the leading train which was then hit by the following train.

== Background ==
Egypt's railways have a record of poor equipment maintenance, neglect, and bad management. The government records nearly 11,000 accidents on rail lines between 2008 and 2017, including a high of 1,793 in 2017. In 2018, President Abdel Fattah el-Sisi stated that the country's government lacked the 250 billion EGP (14 billion USD) in funds required to address all the problems within the rail system.

== Incident ==
The collision occurred in the Tahta district of the Sohag Governorate, approximately 460 km (290 mi) south of the capital city of Cairo. The Egyptian Ministry of Transportation has said passengers in the front train, heading from Luxor to Alexandria, pulled the emergency brakes while in transit between the stations of El Maragha and Tahta. This caused the train to come to a stop, where it was then hit from behind by a second train that was heading from Aswan to Cairo, which destroyed two carriages and caused a third to overturn. Initial death tolls were given at 32, which was revised down to 19 and later to 18.

== Response ==
Seventy-four ambulances were dispatched to treat passengers.

Prime Minister Mostafa Madbouly announced that the families of victims killed in the crash would be given compensation of 100,000 EGP (6,000 USD) and lifetime pensions.

== Investigation ==
On 11 April 2021, Egypt's prosecution service declared that nobody was at the controls of one of the trains when they both collided. In addition, one of the train drivers had deactivated the automatic train control system (ATC) in order to move faster, while an assistant of the stationary train was under the influence of tramadol, and a control tower guard had used cannabis.

== See also ==
- 2002 El Ayyat railway accident
- List of rail accidents in Egypt
