= Kafr Barakat, Al-Ayyat =

Village in Giza Governorate, Egypt

Kafr Barakat
- Village
- Location of Kafr Barakat in Egypt
- Coordinates: 29°30′0″N 31°14′00″E
- Country: Egypt
- Governorate: Giza
- District: El-Ayyat
- Administrative unit: Mit El Qaed

Population (2006)
  - Total: 3,794
- Time zone: UTC+2 (EET)
  - Summer (DST): UTC+3 (EEST)

Kafr Barakat (Arabic: كفر بركات) is a village affiliated with the Mit El Qaed administrative unit, Al-Ayyat District, Giza Governorate, Egypt. According to the 2006 census, the total population of Kafr Barakat was 3,794 people, of whom 2,023 were men and 1,771 were women.
