= 2026 El Ayyat train collision =

Train collision in Egypt

Coordinates: 29.430757°N 31.196755°E

Details
- Date: 8 November 2026
- Location: El Ayyat, Giza Governorate
- Country: Egypt
- Incident type: Rear-end collision, derailment

Statistics
- Deaths: 7+
- Injured: 125+

On 8 November 2026, a train collision occurred in El Ayyat, Giza Governorate, Egypt. At least 7 people were killed and around 125 others were injured.

== Collision ==
A train travelling between Giza and Faiyum collided with the back of a stationary train that was traveling from Cairo to Aswan. Multiple train cars derailed and overturned.

== Casualties ==
At least 7 people were killed, including a driver, and over 125 were injured. Authorities said that the final number of fatalities is still being counted, with more than 70 ambulances dispatched to the scene. Some of the dead were trapped inside the stationary train.

== Investigation ==
Egypt's president, Abdel Fattah el-Sisi, has ordered an investigation to "hold accountable anyone found to have been negligent".

== Reactions ==
The governments of Saudi Arabia and Iran expressed condolences to the Egyptian people after collision.

Within Egypt, there have been calls for the transport minister, Kamel al-Wazir, to resign.

== See also ==
- 2002 El Ayyat railway accident
- 2009 El Ayyat railway accident
- List of rail accidents in Egypt
- List of rail accidents (2020–present)
