= Ali Rafea =

- Ahmed Rafea
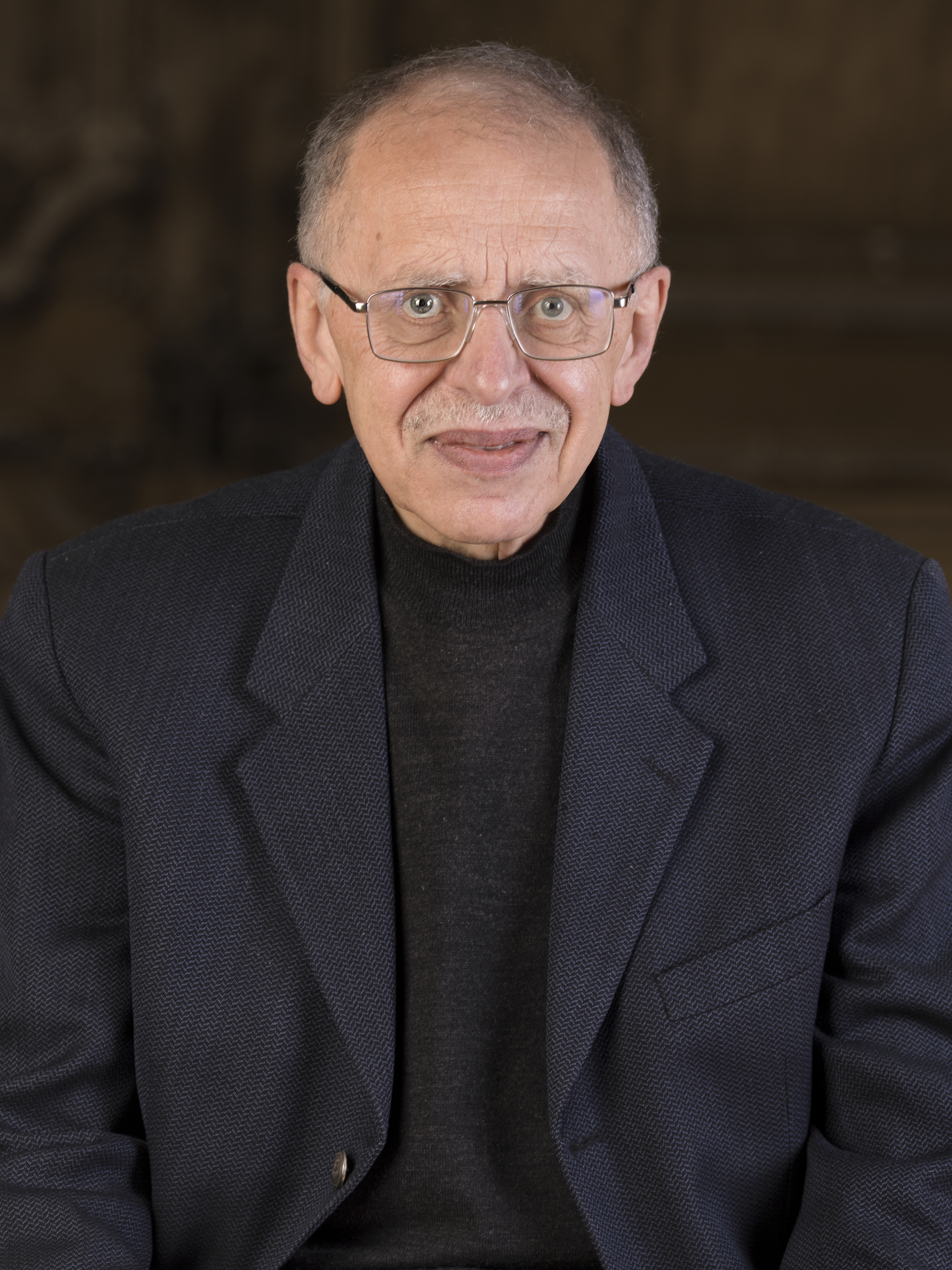
- Born: April 7, 1950 (age 76); Cairo, Egypt
- Occupations: Computer scientist and Sufi leader
- Known for: Egyptian Society for Spiritual and Cultural Research (ESSCR)
- Spouse(s): Assayeda Azza Rifa'a, a grand-granddaughter of Refa'a Rafi' al-Tahtawi
- Children: 3 (Muhammad, Nora, and Mahmoud)
- Parent(s): Rafea Muhammad Rafea and Hazami Rifa'a

Academic background
- Education: Cairo University
- Alma mater: Paul Sabatier University

Academic work
- Institutions: The American University in Cairo
- Main interests: Computer science; Sufism

Ali Rafea (born 1950 in Cairo, Egypt), also known as Ahmed Rafea or Master (Assayed) Ali, is a professor of computer science at The American University in Cairo (AUC), Egypt. Rafea also heads the Egyptian Society for Spiritual and Cultural Research (ESSCR).

== Early life and education ==
Ali Rafea was born on April 7, 1950, in Cairo, Egypt. He is the fifth of ten siblings, and the eldest of three brothers. He attended public primary, preparatory, and secondary schools in Cairo, Egypt and graduated from Cairo University. In 1973, Rafea earned a Bachelor of Science degree in electronics and communication engineering, and in 1975, earned a graduate diploma in computer science from the Institute of Statistical Studies and Research (also at Cairo University). Rafea continued his studies at Université Paul Sabatier, Toulouse, France, where he received another graduate diploma in Computer Science (D.E.A.) in 1977 and completed a PhD in computer science in 1980.

In 1993, Rafea was the Chair of Computer Science Department, Institute of Statistical Studies and Research, Cairo University. In 1998, Rafea was the Vice Dean for Education and Student Affairs of the Faculty of Computers and Information at Cairo University.

His research interests include data, text and web mining, natural language processing, and machine translation, and knowledge engineering and knowledge-based system development.

Rafea is a spiritual teacher, and the head of The Egyptian Society for Spiritual and Cultural Research ESSCR, and his teachings about Islamic spirituality focus on the revelation to the Islamic prophet Muhammad as an inclusive path that reflects the unity of all revelations and words of wisdom, ancient and modern, beyond diversities of expressions. Rafea is recognized by Who's Who in the World, 11th Edition, 1993–1994, and recognized by Who's Who in Science and Engineering, 2nd Edition, in 1994.

== Career ==
Ali Rafea initiated a spiritual cultural and educational project that includes four books. The first book in that series is Beyond Diversities: Reflections on Revelation, which traces a common spiritual path found in heavenly revelations and primordial religions, according to research on sacred texts. The second book Islam from Adam to Muhammad and Beyond, which is about how the revelation to Muhammad reintroduced, confirmed and clarified this one common path of spirituality. The third book, Divine Revelation and Human Interpretations: Opening New Horizons, explores different mindsets behind the varied readings of Islamic scriptures, differentiating between an open approach and closed ones with different degrees of tolerance. Ali Rafea's approach encourages varied interpretations, as long as those interpretations align with the message of love and peace (pacifism).

Ali Rafea has also been leading the ESSCR for about 52 years. In 2008, the Egyptian Society for Spiritual and Cultural Research (ESSCR), under the leadership of Ali Rafea organized Peace Responsibility Symposium with the International Association of Sufism (IAS). Ali Rafea is recently working on extracting the issues he preached in his speeches through the years aiming at introducing an ontology defining the concepts raised in those issues in a structured way

=== Computer Science ===
Master Ali Rafea (known in the academic field as Ahmed Rafea) is a computer science professor and was the chair of the Computer Science and Engineering Department at The American University in Cairo (2013-2019). Rafea served also as the chair of the Department of Computer Science and vice dean at the Faculty of Computers and Information, Cairo University. He was also a visiting professor in San Diego State University, and National University in the United States. Rafea has led many projects, using artificial intelligence and expert systems technologies for the development of the agriculture sector in Egypt. The first project started in 1989 and funded by UNDP. The project's main objective was to use expert system technology to transfer agricultural research results to the field through extension services in the Egyptian Ministry of Agriculture, and one of the outputs of this project was the first real expert system in agriculture that has been deployed and used in the field in Egypt. Rafea was the founder of the Central Laboratory for Agricultural Expert Systems (CLAES) in the Agriculture Research Center, Ministry of Agriculture, and he supervised the activities of this lab. He was also the lead national consultant of Food and Agriculture Organization (FAO) in two projects funded by FAO and the Italian Debt Swap Fund to build a rural and agricultural development communication network using information and communication technology. Rafea was also the principal investigator of several projects for developing intelligent systems and machine translation in collaboration with European and American Universities. He was a member of the Center of Excellence on Data Mining and Computer Modeling, sponsored by the Ministry of Communication and Information Technology.

== Personal life ==
Ali Rafea is married to Assayeda Azza Rifa'a, a grand-granddaughter of Refa'a Rafi' al-Tahtawi. Rafea has three children, Muhammad, Nora, and Mahmoud.

== Publications and bibliography ==
Rafea has authored over 200 scientific papers. Selected papers are listed below.

- Rafea, Ali, Rafea, Aliaa, & Rafea, Aisha. (2022). One Humanity - One Home: Journeys of Spiritual Seekers. (Co-author). The Human Foundation for Publication and Distribution, 2022. ISBN 978-9776657090.
- Rafea, Ali, Rafea, Aliaa, & Rafea, Aisha. (2021). Divine Revelation and Human Interpretations: Opening New Horizon (Co-author). In English, published by The Human Foundation for Publication and Distribution (HFPD), Cairo, Egypt. ISBN 978-977-6657-07-6
- Rafea, Ali, Rafea, Aliaa, & Rafea, Aisha. (2015). Divine Revelation and Human Interpretations: Opening New Horizon (Co-author). In Arabic, published by The Human Foundation for Publication and Distribution (HFPD), Cairo, Egypt. The Same book in Arabic published. ISBN 978-977-85005-4-7.
- Rafea, Ali, Rafea, Aliaa, & Rafea, Aisha. (2004). The Book of Essential Islam, (Co-author), The Book Foundation, London UK. ISBN 1-904510-13-2.
- Rafea, Ali, Rafea, Aliaa, & Rafea, Aisha. (2004). Islam from Adam to Muhammad and Beyond, London England: The Book Foundation.
- Rafea, Ali, Rafea, Aliaa, & Rafea, Aisha. (2005). Beyond Diversities: Reflections on Revelation, Co-author with Ali Rafea and Aisha Rafea, Dar Sadek, Alexandria, Egypt. Nahidt Misr Publication. ISBN 977-14-3220-6.

== See also ==
- Rafea Muhammad Rafea
- Aliaa Rafea
