= Toukh train accident =

2021 Train derailment in Egypt

Details
- Date: 18 April 2021
- Location: Toukh, Qalyubiyya Governorate
- Country: Egypt

Statistics
- Deaths: 23
- Injured: 139

On 18 April 2021, a train derailed in the city of Toukh in Qalyubiyya Governorate, Egypt. The accident left 23 people dead and another 139 injured, trapping several under overturned carriages. It was the third major train accident in Egypt recorded in less than a month. Considering the commonality of train wrecks and mishaps in Egypt, prosecutors blamed the negligence of railway employees and the country's mismanagement.

== Investigation ==
Preliminary investigations attributed the incident to the increased speed of the Toukh train, which was travelling at 120 km/h on a stretch not designed for speeds exceeding 30 km/h. The train's driver, the driver's assistant, and all of the workers of the signs and towers in the area where the crash took place, were taken into custody as part of the investigation.

== Response ==
President Abdel Fattah Sisi commissioned Prime Minister Mostafa Madbouly to form a committee, to be made up of members of the Administrative Control Authority, the Armed Forces Engineering Authority, and the Military Technical College, to determine the cause of the accident. The transport minister, Kamel Al -Wazir, visited the site of the crash, and declared that those responsible would be held to account. The Ministry of Health redirected 58 ambulances to the scene to transport the injured. Ashraf Raslan, head of the Egyptian railway authority, was fired in the aftermath of the incident.

== See also ==
- Sohag train collision, another train crash which took place in Egypt three weeks earlier
- List of rail accidents in Egypt
