= Kafr Qasim, Egypt =

Kafr Qasim
- Village
- Location of Kafr Qasim in Egypt
- Coordinates: 30.032021°N 31.110449°E
- Country: Egypt
- Governorate: Giza
- District: El Ayyat
- Administrative unit: Mit al-Qa'id

Population (2006)
  - Total: 1,430
- Time zone: UTC+2 (EET)
  - Summer (DST): UTC+3 (EEST)

Kafr Qasim (Arabic: كفر قاسم) is a village located within the administrative unit of Mit al-Qa'id, part of the Al-Ayyat District in the Giza Governorate of Egypt.

According to the 2006 census, the total population of Kafr Qasim was 1,430, including 709 males and 721 females.
