= Rafea Muhammad Rafea =

Egyptian spiritual teacher and social activist

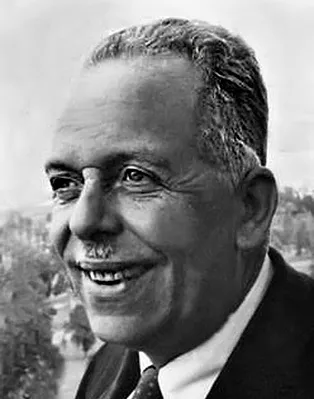
- Born: 1903; Tahta, Upper Egypt
- Died: 1970; Egypt
- Occupation(s): Religious teacher, lawyer, political and social activist
- Spouse: Hazami Rifaa
- Children: 10
- Parent(s): Muhammad Rafea and Aisha Al Sharif

Rafea Muhammad Rafea (born 1903, Tahta, Upper Egypt; died 1970, Egypt), also known as Master Rafea, was an Egyptian spiritual teacher and social activist. He is known for starting the Spiritual Islamic Society in Egypt in the 1950s. His teachings were about Sufism, Islamic spiritualty, and the spiritual teachings of Hannen Swaffer's spiritual circle in London.

== Early life and education ==
Rafea was born on May 13, 1903, in Egypt and was the eldest of four siblings. He attended public primary school in Tahta, Upper Egypt. Rafea graduated from law school at Cairo University.

== Career ==
=== Politics ===
Rafea became interested in politics during his university years and joined the Wafd Party. He specifically campaigned for his brother Abdel Halim. He joined the National Movement in Egypt during the 1920s. After graduating, he worked as an independent lawyer for twenty years.

=== Sufism ===
Rafea later alienated himself from politics and joined Sufism, and started becoming interested in religions, including Islam, Far Eastern spirituality, as well as contemporary religious spirituality.

He met a follower of the Abu El Hassan el-Shazli Order, and they established a Sufi community with people from various backgrounds. Rafea also established a spiritual Islamic community in Egypt.

=== Islamic spiritual teachings ===
Rafea's teachings as a Sufi spiritualist were the basis of establishing the Egyptian Society for Spiritual and Cultural Research, drawing on ideas of European and American spiritualists of the nineteenth and early twentieth centuries. The basis on which the concept and guidance of Rafea was built is that Sufism and spirituality do not contradict each other, but rather harmonize and agree, because both address the inner human being and the essence of man. Rafea's Islamic spiritual teachings are founded on understanding the diverse levels of fitra, which points to the Divine's working laws in all the cosmos.

=== Workers' rights ===
Rafea advocated the cause of workers' social rights. He was part of the National Movement in Egypt during the 1920s, and was involved in the youth Egypt's 1919 revolution against the British occupation.

== Personal life ==
After marrying Al Sayeda Hazam, the granddaughter of Refa'a Rafi' al-Tahtawi, Rafea withdrew from politics and moved to the Helmia al Gedida of Al-Darb al-Ahmar district, in Cairo. He has ten children, including his son Ali, who is continuing his father's religious teachings. His children include Dr. Ahmed Rafea (also known as Ali Rafea), Hanaa Rafea, Aliaa Rafea, Dr. Mahmoud Rafea, Muhammad Wael Rafea, Iman Rafea, Aisha Rafea, Zahraa Mawel Rafea, Hoda Rafea, and Maaman Rafea.

== Death ==
Rafea died in 1970 in Egypt due to diabetes.

== Bibliography ==
- Memoirs of Khabarides: the Future of Spiritualism (1990)
