= Qalyoub train collision =

Railway accident on August 21st 2006, near Qalyoub, Egypt

Coordinates: 30.1997°N 31.2053°E

Details
- Date: 21 August 2006; 20 years ago
- Location: Qalyoub
- Country: Egypt
- Operator: Egyptian National Railways
- Incident type: Collision
- Cause: Signal passed at danger

Statistics
- Trains: 2
- Deaths: 58
- Injured: 140

The Qalyoub train collision occurred at a converging junction in Qalyoub to the north of Cairo in Egypt on 21 August 2006, when two commuter trains collided during the morning rush hour, killing 58 people and injuring over 140.

== Overview ==
A passenger train from Mansoura passed a red signal and crashed into a stationary train that had come from Benha. Four passenger cars derailed in the accident, which closed the line in the country's Nile Delta region. The train was estimated to have been travelling at more than 50 mph (80 km/h) at the time of the collision. The driver of the Mansoura service was amongst the dead.

== Aftermath ==
In the wake of the crash, Egyptian National Railways director Hanafi Abdel Qawi was dismissed and 14 railway officials were later charged with gross negligence and jailed. The prosecutor's office said the officials ignored repairing some technical equipment that control train signals.

Egypt has a poor safety record on its railways and there are several fatal crashes each year, usually blamed on inadequately maintained equipment.

Families of each victim who died in the accident received compensation of £E5,000 (about $US870). Passengers who were injured will get £E1,000.

== Proposed upgrade ==
Egypt is proposing to implement an upgrade project including some upgrade of its signalling.

== Similar accidents ==
- (Australia) 1908 - Sunshine (Braybrook Junction)

== See also ==
- List of rail accidents in Egypt
