= Bani Ammar =

- Location in Egypt
- Coordinates: 26°44′N 31°31′E
- Country: Egypt
- Governorate: Sohag Governorate
- Time zone: UTC+2 (EET)
  - Summer (DST): UTC+3 (EEST)

Bani Ammar (Arabic: بني عمار) is a village located near Tahta-Sohag; south-western between Banhau (Arabic: بنهو) and El-Sawamaa Gharb (Arabic: الصوامعه غرب) to the east and Enibis (Arabic: عنيبس) to west. The inhabitants are mainly working in traditional agricultural activities. Many of them have established other residences somewhere else, mainly in Cairo, Alexandria etc. As is the case with the majority of Egyptians, a great number of the children have already joined the national educational system and have graduated from high schools and universities. Religious education finds—as expected—its roots in this village. It dates back two centuries and is centered on al-Azhar Mosque and university. It is also noted that certain inhabitants have emigrated abroad, mainly to the Gulf countries, Iraq, Libya, etc.

Bani Ammar's first mention is found in the distinguished book "Description of Egypt" (French: Description de l'Égypte (1809)), which is a comprehensive scientific description of ancient and modern Egypt written by the French Scientists accompanying Napoleon's expedition to Egypt from 1798 to 1801. Bani Ammar must be there much earlier than the comprehensive expedition to Egypt.

The National Day of Sohag Governorate (10 April 1799) is to some extent related to the History of Bani Ammar, too. On this day the people around Juhaina (Arabic: جهينة) faced the French troupes, who invaded under the leadership of Napoleon the whole region of Upper Egypt tracing the Mamluki's (Arabic: مماليك). They have been stopped in Juhaina battle. The Juhainas are close relatives to Bani Ammars. Both people immigrated from Arabian Island and even divided their new land accordingly.

Bani Ammars are Hashimitis rooted to the Arabia dynasty of Hashim ibn Abd al-Manaf (Arabic: هاشم بن عبد مناف) . Concretely, the roots of the main family is originated to Ja`far bin Abī Tālib (Arabic:جعفر ابن أبي طالب).
