= Egyptian State Railways 545 class =

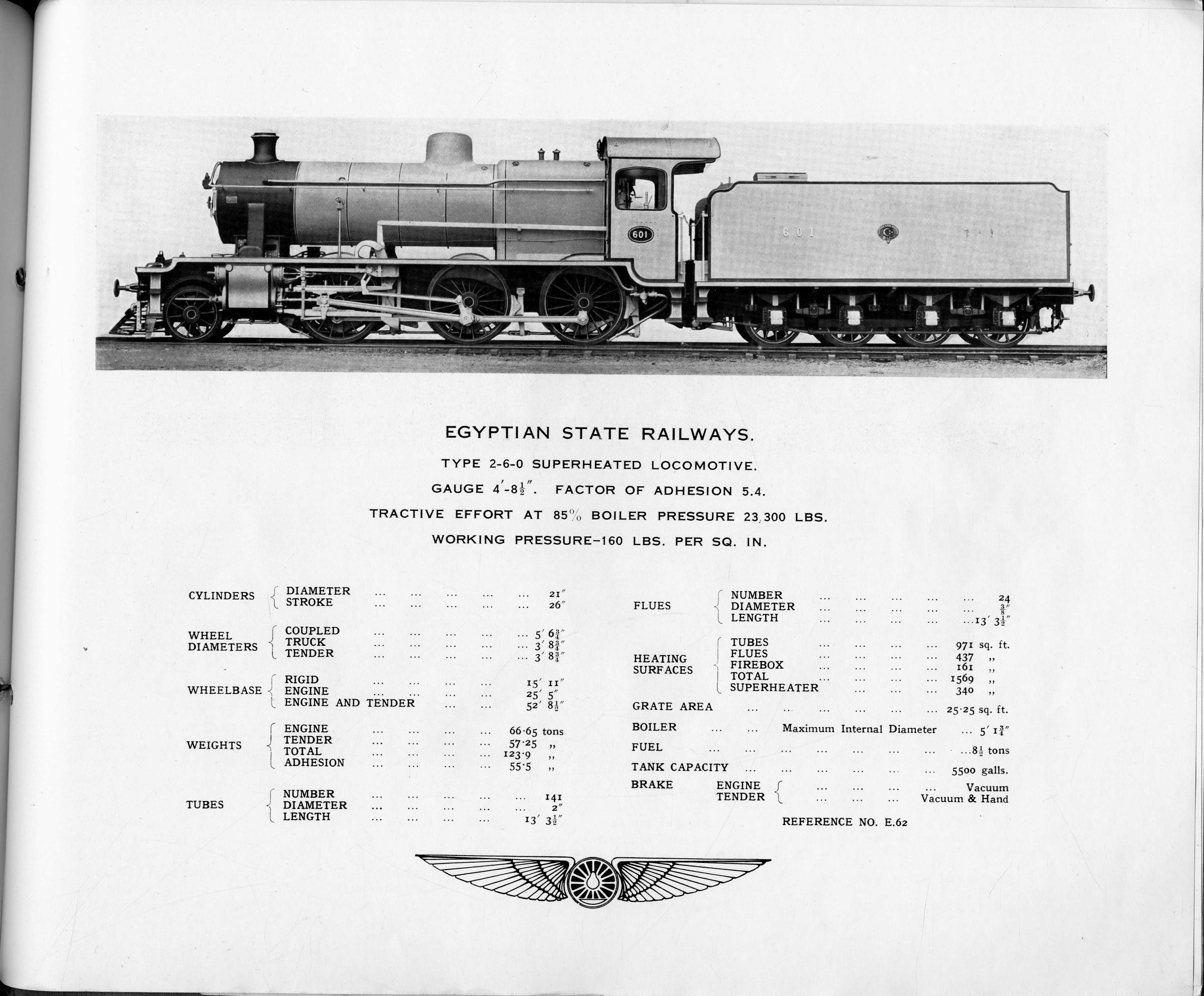
- Armstrong Whitworth brochure of no.601
Type and origin
- Power type: Steam
- Builder: North British Locomotive Company; Armstrong Whitworth; Borsig Lokomotiv Werke GmbH
- Serial number: NBL 23682 – 23721; AW 585 – 604; Borsig 13983 – 14002
- Build date: 1928 (NBL & AW); 1931 (Borsig)
- Total produced: 80
Specifications
- Configuration
  - Whyte: 2-6-0
- Gauge: 1,435 mm (4 ft 8 1/2 in)
- Driver dia.: 5 ft 6 3/4 in (1,695 mm)
- Fuel type: mazut
- Water cap.: 5,500 imperial gallons (25,000 L)
- Firebox
  - Grate area: 25.25 sq ft (2.35 m^{2})
- Boiler pressure: 180 psi (1,200 kPa)
- Heating surface: 1,931 sq ft (179.4 m^{2})
- Cylinders: 2, outside
- Cylinder size: 20 in × 26 in (508 mm × 660 mm)
Performance figures
- Tractive effort: 26,281 lbf (116,900 N)
Career
- Operators: Egyptian State Railways; Israel Railways
- Class: 545
- Number in class: 80
- Numbers: 545 – 624
- Locale: Egypt; after 1956 five in Israel
- Delivered: 1928; 1931
- First run: 1928
- Disposition: five captured by Israel in 1956 & withdrawn by 1959; remainder in Egypt withdrawn by 1963

The Egyptian State Railways 545 class was a type of standard gauge mixed traffic steam locomotive on Egyptian State Railways (Egyptian Republic Railways after the Egyptian Revolution of 1952; now Egyptian National Railways).

== History ==
Between 1920 and 1938 various locomotive builders supplied ESR with 180 2-6-0 tender locomotives, of which 80 were of the 545 class. The initial order for 58 of this class was built in Britain in 1928. Of these, 40 came from the North British Locomotive Company in Glasgow, Scotland and 20 from Armstrong Whitworth in Newcastle-upon-Tyne, England. The design was very British in style, but in 1931 Borsig Lokomotiv Werke GmbH in Berlin, Germany supplied ESR with another 20 to the same design.

Numbers 551, 568, 573 and 596 were rebuilt in 1939 with Caprotti valve gear. Number 590 was damaged at El Daba in June 1942 and withdrawn from stock in September 1943.

In ESR service all members of the class were painted green. In August 1941 Palestine Railways started operating a through passenger service between Haifa and Cairo via El Kantara East and a newly completed swing bridge at El Ferdan; in 1942–43 number 560 had "The Orient Express" painted on the sides of its cab for hauling this service between Cairo and El Kantara East.

All standard gauge steam locomotives in Egypt were withdrawn by 1963.

== 545 class in Israel ==
During the 1956 Israeli invasion of Sinai five members of the class were captured on the former Palestine Railways main line between El Kantara East and Gaza: numbers 546, 550 and 557 (NBL works numbers 23683, 23687 and 23714) and numbers 607 and 613 (Borsig works numbers 13985 and 13991). Israel Railways may have taken four of them into stock and used them around Lod in central Israel for one or two years. They were withdrawn and scrapped by 1959, when steam traction on Israel Railways officially ceased.

== Sources ==
- Cotterell, Paul (1984). The Railways of Palestine and Israel. Abingdon: Tourret Publishing. ISBN 0-905878-04-3.
- Hughes, Hugh (1981). Middle East Railways. Harrow: Continental Railway Circle. ISBN 0-9503469-7-7.
- Proud, Peter; Smith, C, eds. (1946). The Standard Gauge Locomotives of the Egyptian State Railways and The Palestine Railways 1942-1945. London: Railway Correspondence and Travel Society.
