= Al-Nasiriya, Al-Ayyat =

Al-Nasiriyah
- Administrative unit
- Location of Al-Nasiriyah in Egypt
- Coordinates: 30.032021°N 31.110449°E
- Country: Egypt
- Governorate: Giza
- District: Al-Ayyat

Population (2006)
  - Total: 10,260
- Time zone: UTC+2 (EST)

Al-Nasiriyah is an administrative unit affiliated with the Al-Ayyat District, Giza Governorate, Egypt. According to the 2006 census, the total population of Al-Nasiriyah was 10,260 people, including 5,221 men and 5,039 women.

== Administrative Division ==
Al-Nasiriyah consists of 5 administrative divisions:

- Kafr Turki
- Kafr Ammar
- Abu Abbas
- Al-Amiriya
- Al-Saudiya

== See also ==
- El Ayyat
