= Badrashin railway accident =

Railway accident in Egypt

- Location of Giza Governorate in Egypt

Details
- Date: 15 January 2013
- Location: Giza Governorate
- Country: Egypt
- Line: Sohag - Cairo
- Operator: Egyptian National Railways
- Incident type: Derailment

Statistics
- Trains: 2
- Passengers: 1.300
- Deaths: 19
- Injured: 120
- Damage: 2 Train

The Badrashin railway accident took place near Badrashin station in Giza, Egypt, on 15 January 2013. A train en route to Cairo from Sohag derailed, leaving at least 19 people dead and 120 injured.

Egyptian President Mohammed Morsi visited victims of the crash on 15 January, pledging to hold those responsible to account. Meanwhile, witnesses said the last carriage of the train jumped the tracks and crashed into another train parked nearby. The 12-carriage train was carrying more than 1,300 Egyptian soldiers, and according to reports, had to stop several times during the journey to fix an apparent technical problem.

The same stretch of railroad was the site of a head-on collision that killed more than 40 people in 1992.
