= Ramses Station rail disaster =

Train accident in Egypt on 27 February 2019

- Location within Egypt

Details
- Date: 27 February 2019 around 08:00 am (CAT)
- Location: Ramses Square, Cairo
- Coordinates: 30°03′47″N 31°14′48″E
- Country: Egypt
- Line: Alexandria-Cairo line
- Operator: Egyptian National Railways
- Incident type: Driver of train abandoned controls leading to derailment and explosion

Statistics
- Trains: 1
- Deaths: 25
- Injured: 50

The Ramses Station rail disaster occurred on 27 February 2019 in Ramses Station of Cairo, Egypt. Twenty-five people were killed and forty injured.

== Crash ==
In the early morning of 27 February 2019, in Cairo's main train station, Ramses Station, a locomotive hit the buffers at the end of the track at platform 6 at high speed, causing an explosion that sparked a major blaze and fireball that blackened the walls of the station. The locomotive could later be seen inside, leaning to one side next to a platform. One eyewitness said:

I saw a man pointing from the locomotive as it entered the platform, and screaming, ‘There are no brakes, there are no brakes’ before he jumped out of the locomotive. He was probably the driver, but I don’t know what happened to him.

It was later confirmed that the driver was not inside the locomotive during the accident. According to Egypt's Prosecutor General, Nabil Sadek, one train driver had left his train to fight with another train driver; thereafter, the unmanned train struck the barrier.

Transport Minister Hisham Arafat resigned after the incident.

An Egyptian member of parliament publicly called for the employees that were responsible for the accident to face the death penalty.

It was revealed that the train's driver had left the brakes off.

== See also ==
- Alexandria train collision
