= Aliaa Rafea =

Egyptian writer, spiritual activist, and professor of sociology

Aliaa R. Rafea
- علياء رضاه رافع
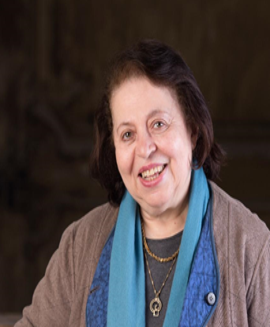
- Born: Aliaa R. Rafea
- Occupations: writer, spiritual activist, professor
- Spouse: Professor Dr. Adel El Beltagy
- Children: Samhaa, Muhammad, Mostafa
- Parent(s): Rafea Muhammad Rafea (father), Hazami Rifaa (mother)
- Website: aliaarafea.me

Aliaa R. Rafea (Arabic:علياء رضاه رافع) is an Egyptian writer, spiritual activist, and professor of sociology at Faculty of Women for Arts at Ain Shams University. She is the founder and president of the Human Foundation.

== Early life and education ==
Aliaa was born to Rafea Muhammad Rafea and Hazami Rifaa and is the great-granddaughter of Rifa'a at-Tahtawi. She graduated in 1970 from Philosophy and Psychology Department at Cairo University. In 1978, she began to study sociology and anthropology at the American University in Cairo (AUC). She received her Master of Arts degree in 1983, and received her Ph.D. from Women's College at Ain Shams University in 1990. She married Adel El Beltagy in 1970, and traveled with her husband to Wales and spent six years where she seized this time to educate herself. She came across the work of the Swiss psychologist C G Jung, among other influential thinkers such as Eric Fromm. This self-education process enabled her later to envision a program of self-realization and relate it to her father's teachings and to the human spiritual heritage, especially the Ancient Egyptian Civilization. She gave birth to Samhaa in 1972. The couple decided to give Rafee a second name for her daughter. They both were attached to the teaching of her father Master Rafea. Mohammed was her second child, born in 1973, and she gave birth to her third child Mostafa in 1986.

== Faculty career ==
From 1979 to 1983 Aliaa had a grant as a research assistant and teaching assistant at the Department of Sociology and Anthropology at the American University in Cairo and then a Postmaster fellow at the Department of Sociology and Anthropology at the American University in Cairo from 1987 to 1988. She has been a visiting scientist at the International Center for Agriculture Research in the Dry Area (ICARDA) from 1995 to 1997. From 1994 to 1997, she worked as an adjunct lecturer and then as an assistant professor at the Faculty of Women Ain Shams University from 1998 to 2003. She has been a visiting professor at Randolph-Macon Women's College, Lynchburg, Virginia in 2002. She was an adjunct professor at The American University in Cairo from 2003 to 2004. Rafea worked as an associate professor in 2003 and then as an expert starting from 2004 at the Department of Population and Migration at The League of Arab States.

=== Social activities and memberships ===
Aliaa joined different civic societies, and she was a member in the Egyptian Society for Human Rights for which she coordinated a conference on the Freedom of Thoughts and Expression, and she shared in establishing Zeinab Kamel Hassan Foundation for Holistic Development, and Aliaa was the secretary general of this foundation from 1992 to 1996, and she was a member in the Society of the Egyptian Writers and withdraw gradually from its activities due to her involvement in the academic career. Among other activities, Aliaa participated in the International Association of Sufism conferences and joined them in the World Religion's Parliament in 2004, and she wrote articles in their Sufism Journal. In 2008, on behalf of the Egyptian Society of Spiritual and Cultural Research, Aliaa coordinated with her sister Aisha Rafea a conference with the International Association of Sufism, titled Peace Responsibility Symposium, held in 6 of October City, Giza, Egypt. Aliaa is also a member in the American Anthropological Association, American Sociological Association, and the International Leadership Association. Aliaa has attended numerous international conferences around the world as an academic and a spiritual figure.

=== Achievements ===
Aliaa established the Human Foundation in 2011, a non-governmental organization (NGO), licensed by the Egyptian Minister of Social Affairs. Under her leadership, the foundation opened activities in various directions, and initiated a publication house. She developed an authentic program of self- realization (the Path Towards Individuation) which has helped many people. Acknowledging her approach to training in analytical psychology, Professor Tehodor Abt invited her to give lectures at the center in 2017 and 2021. She is a lifelong member of the All Ladies League, based in India, shared in the Women Economic Forum in 2016 and 2019, and she was awarded a prize from the All Ladies League for her contribution to human unity. She co-established women's section in the Egyptian Society for Spiritual and Culture Research in 1992, and has been leading cultural forums within the Egyptian Society for Spiritual and Cultural Research, and she is also a member in the Global Peace Initiative of Women, and traveled with them to many places around the world, and gave a presentation in the UN Headquarter in Kinya, 2012. Aliaa also authored and co-authored books and wrote in academic journals.

== Selected works ==
=== Books ===
- Rāfiʻ ʻAlī, رافع ، علي ، Rāfiʻ, ʻAlyāʼ Riḍāh, Rafea, Aisha.(2022).One Home: Journeys of Spiritual Seekers. The Human Foundation for Publication and Distribution (HFPD), Cairo, Egypt. ISBN 978-977-6657-09-0.
- Rāfiʻ ʻAlī, رافع ، علي ، Rāfiʻ, ʻAlyāʼ Riḍāh, Rafea, Aisha.(2021). Divine Revelation and Human Interpretations: Opening New Horizon (published in English). The Human Foundation for Publication and Distribution (HFPD), Cairo, Egypt. ISBN 978-977-6657-07-6.
- Mijares, S., Sharling, D., Amponsem, J., Mallory, M. & Rafea, Aiaa, (2021)The Power of the Feminine: Facing Shadow Evoking Light, The Human Foundation for Publication and Distribution (HFPD), Cairo, Egypt.·ISBN 978-977-6657-04-5.
- ·Rāfiʻ, ʻAlyāʼ Riḍāh, Rafea.(2021) .A Blessed Tree Series: No. 2, Revelation from Medina, The Human Foundation for Publication and Distribution (HFPD), n Arabic. ISBN 978-977-6657-03-8.
- ·Rāfiʻ, ʻAlyāʼ Riḍāh, Rafea.(2021). A Blessed Tree Series: No. 1 Emanation from Zamzam, The Human Foundation for Publication and Distribution (HFPD), In Arabic. ISBN 978-977-6657-01-4.
- Rāfiʻ, ʻAlyāʼ Riḍāh, Rafea.(2017). Wisdom of Islam in the Life of A Muslim: Rafea Muhammad Rafea, The Human Foundation Publication, in Arabic. ISBN 978-977-85005-9-2.
- Rāfiʻ, ʻAlyāʼ Riḍāh, Rafea.(2016). Insight: Vision and Fulfillment: Path and Story, The Human Foundation for Publication and Distribution (HFPD), in Arabic, ISBN 978-977-85005-7-8.
- Rāfiʻ, ʻAlyāʼ Riḍāh, Rafea.(2015). A Journey Into a Human World, based on C.G Jung's biography Memories Dreams and Reflections. The Human Foundation for Publication and Distribution (HFPD), 2015. In Arabic. ISBN 978-977-85005-5-4.
- Rāfiʻ, ʻAlī; رافع، علي.; Rafea, Aisha; Rāfiʻ, ʻAlyāʼ Riḍāh; رافع، عائشة.; رافع، علياء رضاه. (2015). Tanzīl ilāhī wa-mafāhīm basharīyah : āfāq bi-lā ḥudūd (in Swahili). [Cairo]. ISBN 978-977-85005-4-7. OCLC 932335458.
- Rāfiʻ, ʻAlyāʼ Riḍāh; رافع، علياء رضاه. (2016). ʻAyn : ruʼyah wa-irtiwāʼ : sīrah wa-masīrah (in Polish). al-Jīzah. ISBN 978-977-85005-7-8. OCLC 1201696965.
- Jung, Carl Gustav; رافع، علياء رضاه. (2015). <>. مؤسسة البناء الإنساني و التنمية،. ISBN 978-977-85005-5-4. OCLC 1164372320.
- Mijares, Sharon G. (2007). The root of all evil : an exposition of prejudice, fundamentalism, and gender imbalance. Exeter, UK: Imprint Academic. ISBN 978-1-84540-387-4. OCLC 781629112.
- Rafea, Ali; Rāfiʻ, ʻAlyāʼ Riḍāh; Rafea, Aisha (2005). The book of essential Islam : [the spiritual training system of Islam]. Bristol, Eng.: Book Foundation. ISBN 1-904510-13-2. OCLC 60660832.
- Rafea, Ali; Rafea, Aliaa; Rafea, Aisha (2005). Beyond diversities : reflections on revelations. Cairo. ISBN 977-14-3220-6. OCLC 1200947154.
- Angha, Nahid; Mijares, Sharon G.; Rāfiʻ, ʻAlyāʼ Riḍāh (2013). A force such as the world has never known: women creating change. Toronto, Canada. ISBN 978-1-77133-056-5. OCLC 825747402.
- Aliaa, Ali; Rafea, Aisha (2002). Islam from Adam to Muhammad and beyond. [Stuttgart?]: Sadek Pub. ISBN 977-5337-19-4. OCLC 855004573.
- Mijares, Sharon G. (2007). The root of all evil: an exposition of prejudice, fundamentalism, and gender imbalance. Exeter, UK: Imprint Academic. ISBN 978-1-84540-387-4. OCLC 781629112.
- Aliaa, Rafea.(1996). The Egyptian Identity: An Anthropological Study of the School of Art and Life, Dar Sadek, Alexandria, Egypt., In Arabic. ISBN 977-19-1082-5.
- Aliaa, Rafea. (1993). The Sense of Belonging in Relation to Development in Rural Egypt (two volumes), vol.1 Volume 1: The Roots, Dar Sadek for Publication,, and Vol.: The Harvest Dar Sadek, Alexandria, Egypt..
- Aliaa, Rafea.(1992). Noam Chomsky: The Fateful Triangle (Translated into Arabic). Published by Dar Sadek, Alexandria, ISBN 977-5337-03-8.

=== Articles ===
- Rafea, Aliaa (2022-01-01). "Postmodern Feminist Theory and Future Prospects". International Journal of Childhood and Women's Studies. 2 (1). Egypts Presidential Specialized Council for Education and Scientific Research: 20–37. doi:10.21608/ijcws.2022.222352. ISSN 2682-437X. S2CID 247402720.
- Shiva, Vandana; Bartholomew I, Ecumenical Patriarch of Constantinople (2014). Sacred seed. Point Reyes Station, CA. ISBN 978-1-890350-64-2. OCLC 887094848.
- Needed Resurrection of the Feminine Spirit in Egypt" in The International Journal of Gender and Nature and Transformation (IJGN), Vol 1, No 1, electronic edition, published in 2014.
- "Nature and Man: Past and Present In Egypt" in Takako Yamada and Takashi Irimoto Continuity, Symbiosis, and the Mind in Traditional Cultures of Modern Society, Hokkaido University Press, 2011.
- "Peace Between Religiosity and Secularity (Humanness and Divinness), in Sufism, Vol XIV, No 3, pp- 15-39. Published also in the proceedings of Peace Responsibility Symposium, Sponsored by The Egyptian Society for Spiritual and Cultural Research and the International Association of Sufism, 2008, pp. 169- 182
- "Globalization and Culture Boundaries: An Anthropological Perspective" Icfai Journal of History and Culture. India. Volume 1, No3, 2007
- "Islam, Freedom and Human Rights: Anthropological Reading of History" in Wejhat Nazar (Points of View), Volume 7, issue 81 October 2005
- "Universalism in Islam" in R. Hangloo (edit), Approaching Islam, House of Indological Publication, India, 2005, pp. 18–48
- "Dialogue of Cultures: A Teaching Experience in USA" in Femmes Mediterranean's Women". Proceedings of the International Conference held on Fes 24-26 of April 2003. Fatima Saidiqi (editor), published in 2004, Morocco.
- "Perception and Strategies of Households in Bershaya Village, El-Bab District, Syria," Proceedings of the International Dry Lands Development Commission, Sixth International Conference on the Development of Dry Lands, ICARDA, Aleppo, Syria, 2003, pp. 429–434
- "Woman and Dimensions of Reproductive Health," Woman and Poverty: The Demographic and Health Behavior, Arab League Publications, vol. 4, 2002, pp. 163–199
- "Unraveling Different Meanings of the Veil," Sadiqi, Fatima (ed.), Feminist Movements: Origins and Orientations, Publication of the Faculty of Art and Humanities, Dhar El Meharaz, Fès, Morocco, 2001, pp. 25–52
- "Global Transformation and the Changing Roles of Social Sciences," Abdul-Moetti, Abdul-Basit (ed.), Idhafat, no. 3, January 2001, pp. 37–47
- "Culture and Development", Ayad, Shoukry (ed.), Egypt: Visions for the Future, Friends of the Book Publisher, Cairo, Egypt, 1999, pp. 27–47
- "Peasants' Political Rights," Inseparable Rights: Proceedings of the Human Rights Forum on Economic and Social Rights, Dar Jihad, Cairo, Egypt, 1994
- "The Problems of the Youth", A study that was organized and requested from Al-Ahram Newspaper. The Analysis of the study published on the following dates: May 16, 23, 30, 1994
- "Productive Labor in the Egyptian Village," The Question of Peasantry, Arab Research Center Publications, Cairo, Egypt, 1992, pp. 272–282
- "Authenticity and Modernity Considered by some Egyptian Pioneers," El-Manar, no 59, October 1989, pp. 28–35
- Mijares, Sharon; Rafea, Aliaa; Falik, Rachel; Schipper, Jenny (2008). Wedding, Danny (ed.). "Response to "Patriarchy and Religion Revisited" (A Review of The Root of All Evil: An Exposition of Prejudice, Fundamentalism, and Gender Imbalance)". PsycCRITIQUES. 53 (7). Portico. doi:10.1037/a0011050. ISSN 1554-0138.
