= 2009 El Ayyat railway accident =

Railway incident in Egypt

El Ayyat train collision
- Location within Egypt

Details
- Date: 24 October 2009
- Location: El Ayyat, Giza
- Coordinates: 29.6167°N 31.25°E
- Country: Egypt
- Incident type: train collision
- Cause: Suspected train stoppage due to animals on track

Statistics
- Trains: 2
- Passengers: 0
- Deaths: at least 50
- Injured: at least 30
- Damage: several carriages destroyed

The El Ayyat train collision killed at least 50 people and injured 30 others on 24 October 2009. The incident occurred in El Ayyat, 6th of October Governorate, located 50 km south of Cairo. The official death toll has increased and might increase further. One of the trains was going southward to visit the Asyut and Aswan, popular tourist destinations.

== The collision ==
A second train slammed into the first, which had stopped to allow an animal, described by various witnesses and officials as either a cow or a water buffalo, to make its way safely across. The second train was first class and had many passengers aboard; the first one was traveling light. It was thought that two carriages were wrecked completely.

Reports described passengers jumping out of the train, but one carriage fell on another and the two had to be separated by a crane. Attempts to find survivors in the two carriages were eventually halted when rescuers concluded there were no further survivors in or under either car. Carriages were cut to reach the passengers. Casualties were hospitalised. Searches continued throughout the night after the crash.

== Investigation ==
Egyptian railway authorities immediately announced an investigation into the crash. The Egyptian government was criticised for its reaction by some of the surviving passengers. Dubai's daily newspaper Gulf News and Israeli publication The Jerusalem Post both suggested officials on-scene had been forbidden from speaking to the media about the incident. The crash was first reported on Twitter, with news networks initially reluctant to provide coverage.

== See also ==
- 2002 El Ayyat railway accident
