= Alexandria train collision =

2017 train accident in Egypt

Alexandria Train Collision

Details
- Date: 11 August 2017; 2:15 p.m. local time (12:15 UTC)
- Location: Alexandria, Alexandria Governorate
- Country: Egypt
- Line: Cairo-Alexandria Line
- Operator: Egyptian Railway Authority
- Incident type: Collision
- Cause: Under investigation

Statistics
- Trains: 2
- Deaths: 41
- Injured: 179

The Alexandria train collision occurred on 11 August 2017 near Khorshid station in the suburbs of the eastern edge of Alexandria, Egypt.

== Crash ==
Two trains – one traveling from Port Said and the other from Cairo – crashed one into the rear of the other at 2:15 p.m. local time, killing at least 41 people and injuring another 179.

== Reactions ==
On 11 August, President Abdel Fattah el-Sisi expressed his condolences for the victims and ordered government bodies to form an investigative task force to identify the cause of the accident and hold those responsible to account.
