= Qalyub =

Qalyub قليوب ⲕⲁⲗⲓⲱⲡⲉ
- City
- Location in Egypt
- Coordinates: 30°11′59″N 31°12′19″E
- Country: Egypt
- Governorate: Qalyubia

Area
  - Total: 8.27 sq mi (21.43 km^{2})
- Elevation: 72 ft (22 m)

Population (2021)
  - Total: 156,363
  - Density: 18,900/sq mi (7,296/km^{2})
- Time zone: UTC+2 (EET)
  - Summer (DST): UTC+3 (EEST)

Qalyub (Egyptian Arabic: قليوب pronounced [ʔælˈjuːb]; Coptic: ⲕⲁⲗⲓⲱⲡⲉ) is a city containing a rural markaz, and an urban one. It is located in the Qalyubia Governorate of Egypt, in the northern part of the Cairo metropolitan area, at the start of the Nile Delta. In 1986, it had a population of 84,413 inhabitants, which grew to 106,804 residents by 2006, a more than average growth.

== Name ==
The name of the city comes from a Greek personal name Calliope (Ancient Greek: Καλλιόπη). Calliope is an ancient Greek goddess, the Muse of epic poetry.

== Overview ==
Qalyub is the commercial center for a significant agricultural region, and some records indicate that Qalyub has had a farmer's market, regularly, for close to one thousand years.

The people of Qalyub have often proven to be self-reliant like in 1905 when they built their own 500-bed hospital with no help from the state. Years later, the community received money from USAID for the hospital and the school, however, as in many rural villages, the Ministry of Social Affairs angered residents for not doing enough for them. In 1982, the Basic Village Service Program (BVS), under the auspices of USAID, had twenty-five water projects slated for Qalyub.

On February 13, 2005, Qalyub was the location of a politically significant strike over the benefits and the privatization of the Qalyub Spinning Company.

Qalyub was the site of the Qalyoub train collision in August 2006.

Tuk-tuks, small cars, with government-issued license plates, can be seen in modern-day Qalyub as the district has seen a more than average increase in population growth.

== Other ==
The Qalyub orthonairovirus is a member of the Bunyaviridae group of vertebrate-infecting viruses and was named after the town.
