= Tahta =

Tahta ⲧϩⲟⲧⲏ طهطا
- City
- Location in Egypt
- Coordinates: 26°46′06″N 31°30′02″E
- Country: Egypt
- Governorate: Sohag

Area
  - Total: 3.728 sq mi (9.656 km^{2})
- Elevation: 217 ft (66 m)

Population (2021)
  - Total: 182,052
  - Density: 48,830/sq mi (18,850/km^{2})
- Time zone: UTC+2 (EET)
  - Summer (DST): UTC+3 (EEST)

O6 X1 O1 U33 M17 M17 X1 O49
ḥt tj(t)
in hieroglyphs

O6 U33 M17 M17 X1 O49
ḥt tj(t)
in hieroglyphs
Era: 3rd Intermediate Period
(1069–664 BC)

Tahta (Arabic: طهطا / IPA: [ˈtˤɑhtˤɑ], ALA-LC: Ṭahṭā; Ancient Greek: Τοετω; Coptic: ⲧϩⲟⲧⲏ, Coptic pronunciation: [dəˈhodæ]) is a city in the Sohag Governorate of Upper Egypt. It is located on the west bank of the Nile in an area known for its agricultural richness. Tahta had a population of 85,528 at the 2017 census. Egyptologists believe that the modern name may derive from the word Ta-ho-ty (Ancient Egyptian: Tȝ-ḥw.t-Ty). Two famous monasteries are located near Tahta, the White Monastery and the Red Monastery. The town has a small but significant Coptic Catholic community.

Its most famous resident was the reformist intellectual Rifa'a al-Tahtawi, who was born in Tahta in 1801, and who wrote and translated many books following his trip to Paris in 1826 as the imam and chaplain for the first group of Egyptians whom Mehmet Ali Pasha (Muhammad Ali of Egypt) sent to study in western Europe.

== Villages ==
Villages within the jurisdiction of Tahta include:

- Bani Harb (Egyptian Arabic: بنى حرب)
- Nazlit El Qady (Egyptian Arabic: نزلة القاضى)
- Banga (Egyptian Arabic: بنجا)
- El Sawalim (Egyptian Arabic: السوالم)
- Shattoura (Egyptian Arabic: شطوره)
- El Soffeha (Egyptian Arabic: الصفيحه)
- El Kom El Asfar (Egyptian Arabic: الكوم الأصفر)
- Zein Eld Din (Egyptian Arabic: زين الدين)
- Nazlit Ali (Egyptian Arabic: نزلة على)
- Elsawamaa Gharb (Egyptian Arabic: الصوامعه غرب)
- Banhao (Egyptian Arabic: بنهو)
- Bani Ammar (Egyptian Arabic: بنى عمار)
- Enibis (Egyptian Arabic: عنيبس)

== Notable people ==
- Rifa'a el-Tahtawi
- Naguib Sawiris

== See also ==
- List of cities and towns in Egypt
