= Toukh =

Coordinates: 30.353940°N 31.200710°E

Toukh طوخ
- City
- Interactive map of Toukh
- Country: Egypt
- Governorate: al-Qalyubia Governorate
- Elevation: 20 m (66 ft)

Population
  - Total: 44,503
- Time zone: UTC+2 (EET)
  - Summer (DST): UTC+3 (EEST)

Toukh (Arabic: طوخ, Coptic: ⲧⲱϩⲉ, lit. 'chapel') is a city located in Qalyubia Governorate, Egypt. It is located on the Cairo-Alexandria agricultural road. Toukh is also a county that consists of many small towns. These towns include Tant al Gazirah and Berhoum. Toukh County is a semi-rural area that boasts a mixed gender secondary school and multiple primary schools.

== History ==
Toukh is one of the ancient villages, as it was mentioned in the name of Tukh al-Majwal in the book “The Laws of Diwans of Asaad ibn Matati from the works of Al Sharqiya”, which is the name given to it in the Salahi Rock that was conducted by the Ayyubid Sultan Al-Nasir Salah Al-Din in the year 572 AH / 1176 AD. The book, 'The Masterpiece in the Names of the Egyptian Countries', by Ibn Al-Jiaan, enumerated the Egyptian villages after the Nasserite rock, which was carried out by the Mamluk Sultan Al-Nasir Muhammad in 715 AH / 1315AD. In the Ottoman era, its name was in Tarabya in the year 933 AH / 1527 AD, which was conducted by the Ottoman governor Suleiman Pasha Al-Khadem in the era of the Ottoman Sultan Suleiman the Magnificent, Tugh Mujul within the villages of Wilayat Qaliubiya, and in the date 1228 AH / 1813 CE, which counted the villages of Egypt after the survey carried out by Muhammad Ali Pasha in the name of Tokh Malak within the villages of the Directorate of Qaliubiya.

== Infrastructure ==
Most areas in Toukh have running water while those who do not have access to running water have wells. It is ill-advised for travelers to drink the tap water in this location, as the local water treatment plant has yet to be renovated and improved. The local agriculture is of a high quality and includes oranges, lettuce, spinach, molokhia, tomatoes, and mangoes. Although the highway leading to Toukh is paved, many of the small villages in the county have narrow unpaved roads that are also used by livestock, carts, and motorcycles and are characterized by multiple speed bumps.

== Important places ==
There are many important places in Toukh city such as:

- Toukh train station
- El Abed shopping mall
- El Fayoumy Hospital
- Virgin Mary Church (Tant al Gazirah)

== Transport ==
One can reach Toukh by car or by public transportation. Microbuses leave regularly from behind the Faculty of Agriculture metro station on the Shobra-Giza line, heading to Bershoom, Toukh, or Tant al Gazirah. Microbuses also leave regularly from Ramses Square, heading to Banha. From Banha, one can take any transportation to Toukh.
