= 2002 El Ayyat railway accident =

Fire on an Egyptian National Railways Cairo–Luxor train, 20 February 2002

Coordinates: 29°37′13″N 31°15′21″E

- Location within Egypt

Details
- Date: 20 February 2002
- Location: El Ayyat, Egypt
- Country: Egypt
- Line: Upper-Egypt train line
- Operator: Egyptian National Railways
- Incident type: Fire
- Cause: Exploding gas cylinder

Statistics
- Trains: 1
- Deaths: 383+
- Injured: 0

The El Ayyat train disaster occurred at 2 a.m. on 20 February 2002 in an eleven-carriage passenger train traveling from Cairo to Luxor. A cooking gas cylinder exploded in the fifth carriage, causing a fire which destroyed seven third-class carriages.

The initial number of deaths given by officials at the time was 383, all Egyptians. However, considering that seven carriages were burnt to the ground, and each was packed with at least double the maximum carrying capacity of 150, this number may be greatly underestimated. The dubious nature of the given death toll lies with the absence of a full passenger list; accounting for those missing was almost impossible at the time. In addition, the fire was so intense and the carriages so badly burned that many corpses were reduced to ash.

As there was no means of communication between the driver and the rear carriages, the driver did not immediately know of the fire, resulting in many people attempting to flee from the overcrowded carriages, jumping to their death. Some important Egyptians have commented that the official number of 383 dead is grossly inaccurate and was an attempt to lessen the damage done to the reputation of the government.

== Train route and location of the accident ==
Train No. 832 was en route from Cairo to Aswan when a fire broke out in one of its rear carriages at approximately 2:00 a.m. on 20 February 2002. The incident occurred shortly after the train had departed from the city of Al-Ayyat, near the village of Mit al-Qadi in the Al-Barghouti area.

== Cause and casualties ==
Due to panic and fear, some passengers broke the train’s windows and jumped out, resulting in fatalities either from the fall or by drowning in the nearby Ibrahimiya Canal. The train driver detached the front four carriages from the burning ones, notified the relevant authorities, and continued his journey to avoid further potential disaster.

Prime Minister Atef Ebeid, following a visit to Al-Ayyat Central Hospital to check on the injured, stated that the fire was caused by the explosion of a gas stove in the buffet area of one of the carriages, which then spread to the rest of the train. Emergency response teams, including 45 doctors from the Ministry of Health, arrived at the scene within 30 minutes. The government mobilized its full resources, dispatching 90 equipped ambulances, 60 fire engines, and personnel from the railway authority, police, local administrations, health services, and social affairs. The accident resulted in 361 deaths and 66 injuries among the train’s passengers.

== Aftermath ==
The Upper Egypt train disaster, which claimed over 350 lives, is considered the deadliest railway accident in the history of Egyptian railways, which dates back over 150 years. It was later stated that an electrical fault was the cause of the fire, and not a cooking cylinder.

On 27 April 2002, the trial of 11 officials from the Egyptian National Railways began in Cairo. They were charged with negligence in connection with the incident, which led to the deaths of 361 people and injuries to 66 others. The disaster also prompted the resignation of Egypt’s Minister of Transport at the time, Ibrahim El-Demeiry.

The Public Prosecution charged the officials with causing the deaths and injuries through negligence and failure to perform their official duties. In a first for the Egyptian judiciary, the presiding judge, the late Justice Saad Abdel Wahid, led the court in an on-site inspection of the burned train carriages in Al-Ayyat to assess the extent of the damage firsthand before issuing a ruling.

After seven months of hearings and deliberations, the court acquitted all defendants due to insufficient evidence proving their direct responsibility for the incident.

== See also ==
- List of rail accidents in Egypt
- Egyptian National Railways
