= El Ayyat =

El Ayyat العياط
- Town
- Location in Egypt
- Coordinates: 29.616667°N 31.25°E
- Country: Egypt
- Governorate: Giza

Area
  - Total: 2.74 km^{2} (1.06 sq mi)
- Elevation: 13 m (43 ft)

Population (2023)
  - Total: 46,747
  - Density: 17,100/km^{2} (44,200/sq mi)
- Time zone: UTC+2 (EET)
  - Summer (DST): UTC+3 (EEST)

El Ayyat (Arabic: العياط) is a town in the Giza Governorate, Egypt. Its population was estimated to be 46,747 people in 2023.

== Etymology ==
The city was formerly known as Kafr al-Ayyat (Arabic: كفر العياط).

The word Ayyat comes from the Egyptian Arabic word "عياط" which means he who cries, based on a Coptic tradition.

== Geography ==
El Ayyat is located to the south of Giza, and it is limited to four borders to the east, the Nile River, to the west, Faiyum Governorate, to the north, the Badrashein Center, and to the south, the Al-Wasta Center of the Governorate of Beni Suef.

=== Villages ===
The Markaz includes the town and 38 other villages, from the north: Al-Ayat Al-Danaweh village and the village of Kafr Al-Rifai (the first two villages in the center of Al-Ayat from the north and directly after the village of Mazghouna) and the village of Al-Naseriya and Kafr Barakat and the village of Kafr Turk, Behbeit and the village of Brecht, Matania, Kafr Ammar, Al-Atef and the facility Fadel, Blida, and Jerzah, Al-Qatoori, Saudi Arabia, Bedif, Al-Dabaa, Kafr Al-Rifai, Western Raqqa, Al-Musanadah, Al Jamla, and other villages.

== History ==
The ancient village of Lisht, the capital of Pharaonic Egypt during the Middle Kingdom, is located near Al-Ayat. It was called in the Pharaonic era “It-Tawy,” meaning holding on the two lands. The region is an extension of the famous archeological cemetery of Memphis, located south of the Dahshur region, 50 km south of Cairo from the south of the Meidum region the last extension of the necropolis of Memphis.

King Amenemhat I built his funerary complex there, consisting of the Valley Temple, the Ascending Road and a funerary temple and pyramid . In the 19th century, an American archaeological mission found the tombs of Egyptian dignitaries buried there. Amenemhat's son Senusret I erected a funerary complex nearby.

Efforts are under way to reduce groundwater seepage to prevent damage to royal burial chambers inside the two pyramids and restore inscriptions in the Senusert Ankh cemetery which contain hundreds of spells and texts.

A life-sized statue of King Senusert I was found there, along with the tomb of Het Hatab.

== Economy ==
The city contains a factory for oils and soaps. An industrial zone is planned for desert region between Al-Ayyat and Fayyoum.

== Transportation ==
Public transportation between the markaz and Greater Cairo is either by microbus or from a railway station where only the slow train stops. Train accidents in the region include:

- The Upper Egypt train fire in 2002
- 2009 El Ayyat railway accident
- A collision in Bled, Blida in 2016
- 2026 El Ayyat train collision
