= Military Intelligence Authority =

Egyptian military intelligence agency

- هيئة الاستخبارات العسكرية
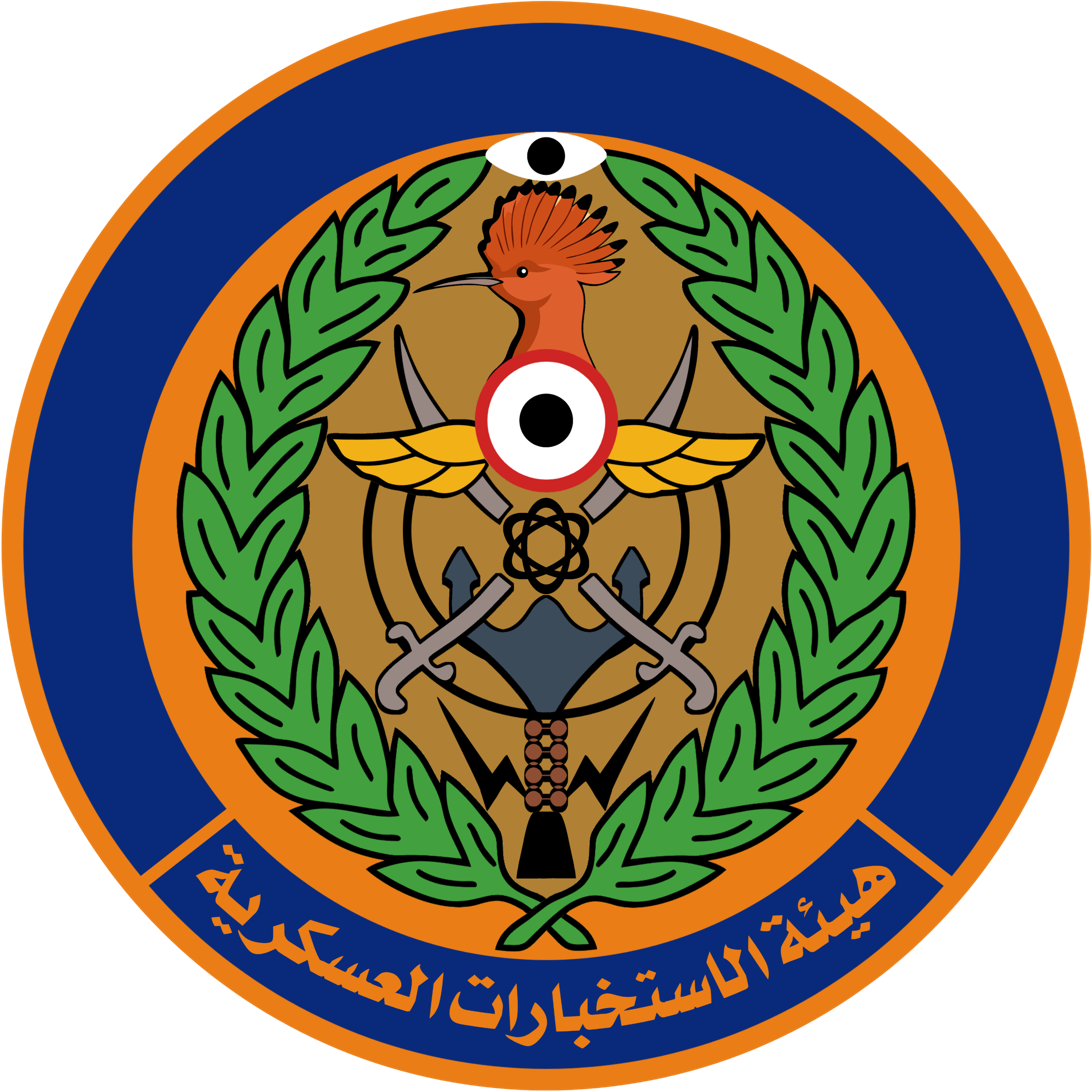
- Official emblem

Agency overview
- Formed: 1952; 74 years ago
- Jurisdiction: Ministry of Defense
- Headquarters: Cairo, Egypt
- Agency executive: Khaled Megawer, director
- Parent agency: President of Egypt

The Military Intelligence Authority (Arabic: هيئة الاستخبارات العسكرية, romanized: Hayy'at Alaistikhbarat Eleaskaria), is the national military intelligence agency of the Egyptian Ministry of Defense responsible for analysis and development of intelligence gathering and counterintelligence systems to create national military security, black operations, counter foreign military intelligence, counterterrorism, foreign military intelligence threat gathering and assessment to national security, and support hybrid warfare operations.

It is one of three main entities in the Egyptian Intelligence Community, along with the General Intelligence Service (GIS) and National Security Sector (NSS).

== Overview ==
A number of senior officers of the Egyptian Armed Forces (Al-Qūwāt Al-Musallaḥah Al-Maṣrīya) have led the agency, including Field Marshal Abd Al-Halim Abu-Ghazala, a former defence minister, Gen. Omar Suleiman, the former vice president and former head of the General Intelligence Service, and Major General Murad Muwafi President of the General Intelligence Service, who was appointed successor to Suleiman in January / December 2011.

Specialties of the agency include black operations particularly those involving the capture or kill high-value targets, collecting information on enemy formations and preparations in wartime and peacetime, counter foreign military intelligence, counterterrorism, geographical surveys, special reconnaissance to discover enemy movements, and support hybrid warfare operations. The agency has also, since the time of Gamal Abdel Nasser, conducted an internal mission to detect anti-regime elements within the military.

Historically, the agency suffered two major blows: failing to predict the Israeli attack on Egypt in the 1967 Arab-Israeli War, and failing to stop the assassination of President Anwar Sadat by Islamists linked to the military in 1981. According to General Mohammad Sadiq (1917–1991), director of intelligence during the 1967 war, the most important reason for the intelligence failure then was the lack of coordination between GIS and military intelligence.

== Tasks ==
- Protect the state from any possible attack from the enemy and know the capabilities and military capabilities of the enemy
- Planning and coordination with the military police to ensure the security of military facilities and barracks, leading this department Colonel/ Gamal eldin Elsabrouty.
- The level of security control in military installations and security including documents and personnel, weapons and other security
- Counter-intelligence to obtain a Top Secret security clearance with Sensitive Compartmented Information eligibility, and a shield to any cyberattacks, leading this department lieutenant-colonel/ Elhamy Elsebaey, and Colonel/ Amr Labeb.
- The use of available sources of information to monitor the enemy's military activities
- Ensure good discipline and loyalty of officers and individuals
- Cooperation with other intelligence agencies in the same state for the exchange of information and complete the tasks, ensuring the achievement of national security
- Ensure that everything is going within order and Military structure is working smoothly

== Directors ==
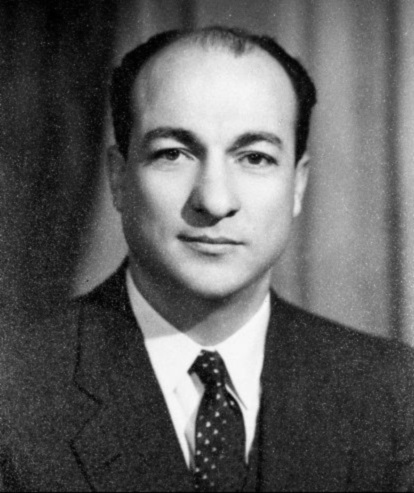
Major General Zakaria Mohieddin, the first Manager of the Department of military intelligence and reconnaissance 1952–1953

- Brigade Staff of War Zakaria Mohieddin (1952–1953)
- Brigade Staff of War Mohammed Sadiq (1966–1969), promoted to the rank of general and served as Minister of War.
- Brigade Staff of War Mehrez Mustafa (1969–1972)
- Brigade Staff of War Mohamed Abdel Ghani el-Gamasy (1972), promoted to the rank of marshal and served as Minister of War.
- Brigade Staff of War Mohamed Fouad Nassar (1972–1975)
- Brigade Staff of War Labib Sharab
- Brigade Staff of War Emad Thabet
- Brigade Staff of War Mahmoud Abd Allah
- Brigade Staff of War Abd Al-Halim Abu-Ghazala (1979–1980), promoted to the rank of marshal and served as Minister of Defense.
- Brigade Staff of War Ahmed Abd El Rahman (1980–1986)
- Brigade Staff of War Amin Nimr (1986–1989)
- Brigade Staff of War Omar Suleiman (1991–1993)
- Brigade Staff of War Kamal Amer (1994–1997)
- Brigade Staff of War Mohamed Fareed (2004)
- Brigade Staff of War Murad Muwafi (2004–2010)
- Brigade Staff of War Abdel Fattah el-Sisi (2010–2012), promoted to the rank of Marshal and served as Minister of Defense.
- Brigade Staff of War Mahmoud Hegazy (2012–2014), promoted to the rank of lieutenant general and served as Chief of Staff of the Armed Forces.
- Brigade Staff of War Salah Al-Badri (2014–2015)
- Brigade Staff of War Mohammed Farag El Shahat (2015–2018)
- Brigade Staff of War Khaled Megawer (2018–present)
