= Abbas Kamel =

Previous director of Egyptian General Intelligence Service

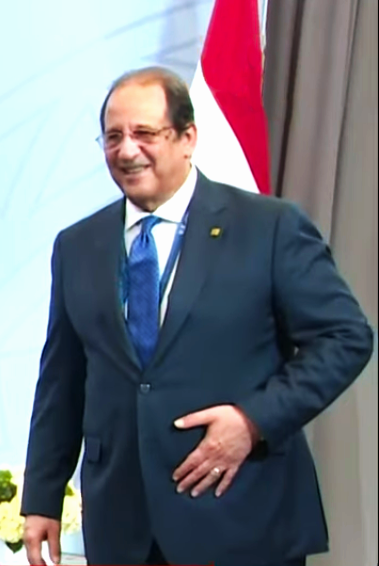

Director of the General Intelligence Directorate
- In office 28 June 2018 – 16 October 2024
- President: Abdel Fattah el-Sisi
- Preceded by: Khaled Fawzy
- Succeeded by: Hassan Rashad

Personal details
- Born: 1957 (age 68–69)

Military service
- Allegiance: Egypt
- Branch/service: Egyptian Army
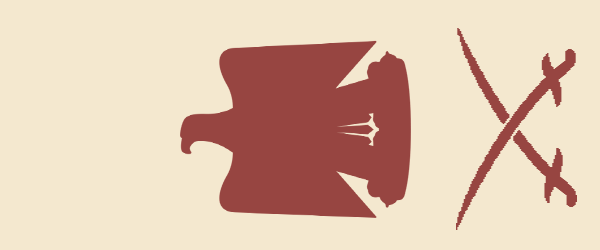
- Rank: Major General
- Battles/wars: Gulf War

Major General Abbas Kamel (Arabic: عباس كامل; born 1957) is an Egyptian retired military officer who serves as a presidential adviser and coordinator for security apparatuses. He was the Director of the Egyptian General Intelligence Directorate (EGID) between 2018 and 2024. He was previously the Chief of Staff to the President Abdel Fattah el-Sisi.

== Education ==
Abbas Kamel graduated from Military college in 1978, then served as an officer in the armored corps. He received an advanced armament course from the United States of America. He also had strategy courses for military attachés from the Geneva Centre for Security Policy.

== Career ==
Kamel was the Deputy Egyptian Defense Attaché at the Egyptian embassy in the Czech Republic. He worked in the Military Intelligence and Reconnaissance of the Military Attaché Department until assuming the chairmanship of the branch.

Kamel became the Director of the Office of the Supreme Commander of the Armed Forces in 2012. In 2014, he served as the Chief of Staff to the President Abdel Fattah el-Sisi, until his appointment as Head of the General Intelligence Service in 2018.

In May 2021, Kamel met Israeli and Palestinian officials following the Israel–Palestine crisis. In August 2021, he met Israeli Prime Minister Naftali Bennett and Defense Minister Benny Gantz to prevent new clashes with Hamas.

On October 16 2024, El Sisi appointed Abbas Kamel as the presidential advisor and coordinator of security apparatuses.

== Awards ==
Kamel was honored with the longest service medal and a second-class Order of the Republic, as well as a medal from the Brazilian State.
