= Shams Badran =

Egyptian politician and minister (1929–2020)

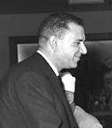

Minister of War
- In office 10 September 1966 – 10 June 1967
- President: Gamal Abdel Nasser
- Preceded by: Abdel Wahab Al Bishri
- Succeeded by: Abdel Wahab Al Bishri (interim); Amin Howeidi

Personal details
- Born: 19 April 1929 Giza, Kingdom of Egypt
- Died: 28 November 2020 (aged 91) Plymouth, United Kingdom
- Education: Military academy

Shams Al Din Badran (Arabic: شمس الدين بدران; 19 April 1929 – 28 November 2020) was an Egyptian government official. He served as minister of war of Egypt during Gamal Abdel Nasser's era and the Six-Day War of 1967. He was removed from his post during the war and later imprisoned. After his release he married a British woman and lived in "self-imposed exile" in the United Kingdom.

== Early life and education ==
Badran was born on 19 April 1929. After high school, he attended a military academy and graduated in 1948 as a junior officer and almost immediately dispatched to the 1947–1949 Palestine war, where he was besieged by Zionist militias along with Gamal Abdel Nasser in Al-Faluja, for which he earned a Gold Medal of Merit from Farouk of Egypt. Badran was later sent to France for a one-year training on a military scholarship.

== Career and activities ==
Badran was the head of Egypt's military security services in the mid-1960s. He also served as the office manager of Field Marshal Abdul Hakim Amer under Gamal Abdel Nasser's presidency. Badran was one of the top aides of Amer. The Muslim Brotherhood accused him and Amer of responsibility for the torture of Brotherhood leaders who had been arrested due to their alleged plans to assassinate Nasser in 1965.

Badran was appointed minister of war on 10 September 1966, a few months before the Six-Day War in June 1967, replacing Abdel Wahab Al Bishri in the post. Amer had supported Badran's appointment. Badran was also named as the chief of Nasser's cabinet the same year. Badran met with the Fatah members in the late 1966. They asked to create a Fatah base in the Negev desert which would be backed by the Egypt's logistical help to attack the Israeli army. However, Badran did not take their plan seriously. On 25 May 1967, Badran visited Moscow and met senior Soviet officials, including Prime Minister Alexei Kosygin, to secure their support regarding a perceived Israeli threat. Badran resigned from office on 10 June 1967, during the Six-Day War, and was replaced by Abdel Wahab Al Bishri, interim minister of war. Amin Howeidi was named as the minister of war on 22 July 1967.

Following the defeat of the Egypt in the Six-Day War Badran was considered as a successor to the President Gamal Abdel Nasser.

== Conviction and later years ==
Badran along with other senior officials, including Amer, was detained on 25 August 1967 on charges of plotting against Nasser. However, they were tried for their roles during the Six Day War in 1967, including for Badran charges of torturing members of the Muslim Brotherhood. Badran appeared in court in two separate trials. He and Salah Nasr, former chief of intelligence and also part of Amer's faction, were convicted and sentenced to hard labour due to their roles in the defeat.

Following his release from prison by president Anwar Sadat on 23 May 1974, Badran left Egypt and went to live in London. Badran published part of his memoirs in the Kuwaiti newspaper Al-Siyasa in 2014. Badran's reports included information about the personal life of Gamal Abdel Nasser which were disputed by Sami Sharaf, a Nasser era official.

== Personal life ==
Badran married his first wife, Muna Rushdie, on 7 June 1962. The couple had one daughter named Hiba; they divorced in January 1989 by a court decision, as he had been absent for three years. Rushdie worked at The American University in Cairo. In the 1970s he married a British woman with whom he had two children. Badran lived with his family in "self-imposed exile" in the United Kingdom, though one of his children moved to Saudi Arabia and another to the United States.

On 28 November 2020, Badran died in the University Hospitals Plymouth NHS Trust; however, he had asked to be buried in Egypt.
