= Abdel Wahab el-Beshry =

20th century Egyptian politician and Minister

Abdel Wahab el Beshry
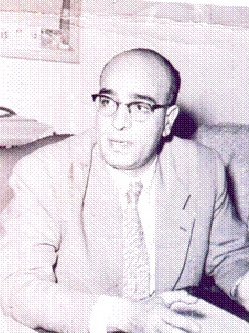

Minister of Defence
- In office 29 September 1962 – 10 September 1966
- President: Gamal Abdel Nasser
- Preceded by: Abdel Hakim Amer
- Succeeded by: Shams Badran

Commander of Armed Forces
- In office 19 June 1967 – 22 July 1969
- Preceded by: Shams Badran
- Succeeded by: Amin Howeidi

Abdel Wahab el-Beshry was a Minister of Defence of Egypt during the period Gamal Abdel Nasser was president. He was among the leading figures in Egypt during the 1960s.

He served as Defence Minister until 10 September 1966 when he was replaced by Shams Badran.

He also had command of the Egyptian Armed Forces for two terms, one of which was after Abdel Hakim Amer's death.
