= Khaled Fawzy =

Egyptian Intelligence director

Director of the General Intelligence Directorate
- In office 21 December 2014 – 28 June 2018
- President: Abdel Fattah el-Sisi
- Preceded by: Mohamed Fareed
- Succeeded by: Abbas Kamel

Personal details
- Born: 1957 (age 68–69)

Military service
- Allegiance: Egypt
- Branch/service: Egyptian Army
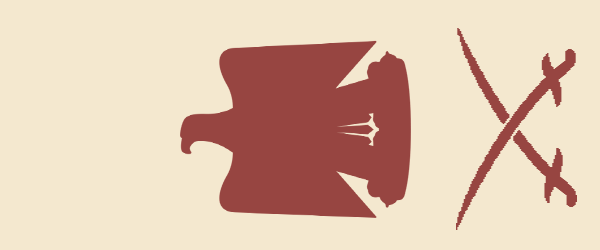
- Rank: Major General
- Battles/wars: Gulf War

Major General Khaled Fawzy (In Arabic: خالد فوزي; b. 1957) is a former director of the Egyptian General Intelligence Directorate (EGID). He was the head of the national security agency since 2013.

== Biography ==
He was born in 1957, in 1978 he was graduated from Military Science Military Academy, joined the EGID in 1982, stayed in service till he reached the rank of Major General, and then pushed through to the post of head of the National Security in 2013.

Fawzy rose to be head of the National Security Authority, EGIS's counterintelligence arm responsible for investigating espionage and protecting state secrets.

Fawzi was named head of EGIS effective 21 December 2014, replacing Mohamed Farid El-Tohamy. As the service's head, Fawzy hired two lobbying companies to improve the service's image in the United States.

Fawzy was fired by el-Sisi in a one-line statement in January 2018 and replaced by Abbas Kamel, a confidant and his chief of staff. The reason for Fawzy's sacking was not identified by Egyptian officials, but came several days after a New York Times published a report describing phone calls in which an alleged Egyptian intelligence officer is instructing talk show hosts to convince their audiences to accept Jerusalem as the capital of Israel. For their part, Egyptian media claimed Fawzy was stepping down for health reasons.
