= Egyptian–Czechoslovak arms deal =

1955 arms supply agreement

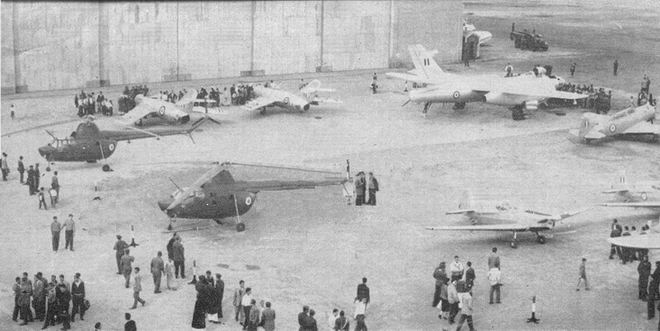
The display at Almaza Airport (Heliopolis, Cairo) showing all the new types of aircraft purchased from Czechoslovakia and the USSR (clockwise): MiG-17F, MiG-15bis, Il-28, Yak-11, Zlin 226, and two Mi-1 helicopters

The Egyptian–Czechoslovak arms deal was an agreement between the USSR and Egypt led by Gamal Abdel Nasser, announced in September 1955, to supply Egypt with more than $83 million worth of modern Soviet weaponry, through Czechoslovakia. The deal was a major turning point in the Cold War and greatly impacted the Arab–Israeli conflict.

== History ==
During British occupation as a 'protectorate', and under a complacent monarchy, the Egyptians made several attempts to purchase heavy arms from Czechoslovakia years before the 1955 deal. In 1947-48 a deal was made, but deliveries stopped in 1948. This was in large part due to the difficulty in securing transportation of arms shipments to their desired destination while the region was under the UN weapons embargo during the 1948 Palestine War. Another major deal was signed on October 24, 1951, where Egypt requested 200 tanks, 200 armored vehicles, 60 to 100 MiG-15 planes, 2000 trucks, and 1000 jeeps among other weapons, but were never delivered.

== Post-colonial military and the Tripartite Declaration ==
Less than a year later, the Free Officers overthrew the king in the July 1952 Revolution, and initiated the expulsion of the British occupying forces. They also immediately set to work on building up a post-colonial army, though seeking American rather than Soviet support. Within two four months of coming into power, Free Officer and future spy chief Ali Sabri was dispatched to Washington in December 1952 to negotiate the purchase of heavy weapons.

However, the United States only offered light weapons, under condition they were fully paid in cash and only to be used for internal security and defense. While Nasser's first choice for buying weapons was the United States, his frequent anti-Israeli speeches and his sponsorship for the fedayeen who were making raids into Israel had made it difficult for the Eisenhower administration to get the approval of Congress to sell weapons to Egypt. American public opinion was deeply hostile towards selling arms to Egypt that might be used against Israel, and moreover Eisenhower feared starting a Middle Eastern arms race.

Eisenhower very much valued the Tripartite Declaration as a way of keeping peace in the Near East. Signed in 1950 in order to limit the extent that the Arabs and the Israelis could engage in an arms race, the three nations which dominated the arms trade in the non-Communist world, namely the United States, the United Kingdom and France had signed the Tripartite Declaration, where they had committed themselves to limiting how many arms they could sell in the Near East, and also to ensuring that any arms sales to one side was matched by arms sales of equal quantity and quality to the other. Eisenhower viewed the Tripartite Declaration, which sharply restricted how many arms Egypt could buy in the West, as one of the key elements in keeping the peace between Israel and the Arabs, and believed that setting off an arms race would inevitably lead to a new war.

== 1955 arms deal ==
Instead of siding with either super-power, Nasser took the role of the spoiler and tried to play off the super-powers in order to have them compete with each other in attempts to buy his friendship. He had let it be known in 1954–55 that he was considering buying weapons from the Soviet Union as a way of pressuring the Americans into selling him arms he desired. Nasser's hope was that faced with the prospect of Egypt buying Soviet weapons, and thus coming under Soviet influence, the Eisenhower administration would be forced to sell Egypt the weapons he wanted. Khrushchev who very much wanted to win the Soviet Union influence in the Middle East, was more than ready to arm Egypt if the Americans proved unwilling.

And so, in June 1955, a secret Egyptian military delegation headed by the Director of the Bureau of the Commander in Chief, Hafez Ismail, went to Prague to negotiate a £E30 million (US$ 83.3 million then) arms deal. It is thought to have included 100 T-34 tanks and IS-3 Stalin tanks, 80 MiG-15 jet fighter planes, 30 Ilyushin IL-28 bombers, large quantities of self-propelled guns, armored personnel carriers, artillery equipment, several naval vessels, small arms and munitions, representing a staggering 85 percent of all foreign weapons shipped to the Middle East between 1951-1956. In Ismail's memoirs, no numbers were cited for the weapons requested.

Nasser's request for weapons was more than amply satisfied as the Soviet Union had not signed the Tripartite Declaration. On September 27, 1955, Nasser proudly announced the deal in a speech at military exhibition proclaiming that the "fifth goal of your revolution, of building a strong national army" has been achieved through the "unconditional" acquisition of heavy weapons. The news was greeted with shock and rage in the West, where this was seen as major increase in Soviet influence in the Near East. In Britain, the increase of Soviet influence in the Near East was seen as an ominous development that threatened to put an end to British influence in the oil-rich region.

A complementary arms deal would be brokered in Prague and Warsaw - for naval vessels and training - between November 1955 and April 1956 totaling £E40 million, while the Egyptian Office for Military Procurement would be set up initially in Prague, before relocating to Moscow, presumably after the Czech cover for buying Soviet arms was no longer needed.

== Impact ==
There is near universal agreement among historians that the deal was what led Israel to start planning a war against Egypt, to be fought at Israel's convenience rather than waiting for an Egyptian attack—which culminated in the Suez Crisis.

== See also ==
- Arms shipments from Czechoslovakia to Israel 1947–49
