= Mohamed Raafat Shehata =

Egyptian soldier and intelligence chief

Director of the General Intelligence Directorate
- In office 19 September 2012 – 5 July 2013
- President: Mohamed Morsi
- Preceded by: Murad Muwafi
- Succeeded by: Mohamed Ahmed Farid

Mohamed Raafat Shehata Abdel Wahed is an Egyptian major general, soldier, and intelligence officer.

At the beginning of his career in the Intelligence Service he worked for the Egyptian Strategic Research Center. He was said to have helped negotiate the prisoner swap deal between Hamas and Israel, including the release of imprisoned Israeli soldier Gilad Shalit, in October 2011.

He was undersecretary of Egyptian General Intelligence Directorate (EGID) since early 2012, and appointed as acting director of the EGID by Egyptian President Mohamed Morsi on 8 August 2012 after Major-General Murad Muwafi was sacked from the post.

On 18 September 2012, he was promoted as Egypt's new EGID director. He became commander of the Republican Guard and continued with his duties until July 2013.

After the 2013 Egyptian coup, Raafat Shehata was replaced as EGID Director by Mohamed Ahmed Farid. He was appointed Counsellor of Security Affairs of the acting Egyptian President Adly Mansour.
