= Tripartite Declaration of 1950 =

Joint American–British–French statement after the 1948 Arab–Israeli War

The Tripartite Declaration of 1950, also called the Tripartite Agreement of 1950, was a joint statement by the United States, United Kingdom, and France to guarantee the territorial status quo that had been determined by the 1949 Arab–Israeli Armistice Agreements.

Developed from discussions related to the armistice, the declaration outlined the parties' commitment to peace and stability in the Middle East and their opposition to the use or the threat of force. They pledged to take action within and outside the United Nations to prevent violations of the frontiers or armistice lines. Further, they reiterated their opposition to the development of an arms race.

The declaration also stipulated close consultation among the three powers, with a view to limiting the Arab–Israeli arms race; it was issued on 25 May 1950.

== Motivations ==
The Western powers aimed to maintain stability and the free flow of oil, to neutralize the Arab–Israeli conflict, and, if possible, to convince Arabs and Israelis to make common cause with the West against the threat of Soviet encroachment.

The United States was the central force behind the agreement. President Dwight Eisenhower viewed it as a proper instrument to ensure neutrality of the West, particularly the United States in the Arab-Israeli conflict. The ultimate purpose was to prevent any seizure in the Middle East by force.

== Impact ==
According to Gerald M. Steinberg, the "agreement did not prevent the Arab states from obtaining weapons through their alliance relationships with suppliers, but Israel was excluded.... Little foreign aid was provided by the United States, and Israeli military officials who sought to purchase weapons and ammunition in the United States were rebuffed."

=== NEACC ===
In June 1952, the parties set up the Near East Arms Coordinating Committee (NEACC) through which they co-ordinated their arms sales to all parties in the conflict. The United States sold virtually no arms in the Middle East, leaving those markets to Britain and France, with considerable competition between the two. The NEACC functioned reasonably well for more than three years. Both Britain and France periodically withheld arms from the rivals in the Arab–Israeli dispute, primarily when states took action that threatened either British or French regional interests. The three powers recognized, however, that the Arab states and Israel needed to maintain a certain level of armed force for purposes of internal security and legitimate self-defense. They declared that they would consider arms requests in light of those principles, including requests that would permit the countries to "play their part in the defense of the area as a whole." An important but somewhat-unenforceable clause of the Tripartite Agreement also stressed that the three powers would sell arms only with an assurance that the purchasing nations would not use them for acts of aggression against other nations.

=== Czech arms deal affects declaration ===
The Czech arms deal of September 1955 in which the Soviet Union agreed to sell Egypt $250 million worth of modern weaponry, made irrelevant Western efforts to limit the flow of arms. In April 1956, France began to transfer large quantities of modern arms to Israel. “France had been supplying Israel with arms since the early 1950s under the terms of a secret Franco-Israeli arms arrangement (in violation of the Tripartite Agreement, but with American support and encouragement)."

== Sources ==
- Slonim, Shlomo (1987). "Origins of the 1950 tripartite declaration on the Middle East". Middle Eastern Studies. 23 (2): 135–149. doi:10.1080/00263208708700696. JSTOR 4283168.
- Tal, David (2009). "The Making, Operation and Failure of the May 1950 Tripartite Declaration on Middle East Security". British Journal of Middle Eastern Studies. 36 (2): 177–193. doi:10.1080/13530190903007244. S2CID 143993824.
