= Murad Muwafi =

Egyptian Intelligence chief

Mourad Mohamed Muwafi
- مراد موافي

Director of the General Intelligence Directorate
- In office 31 January 2011 – 8 August 2012
- President: Hosni Mubarak; SCAF (Acting); Mohamed Morsi
- Preceded by: Omar Suleiman
- Succeeded by: Mohamed Raafat Shehata

Director of the Military Intelligence
- In office 21 March 2004 – 3 January 2010
- Preceded by: Mohamed Fareed
- Succeeded by: Abdel Fattah el-Sisi

Personal details
- Born: 2 February 1950 (age 76) Alexandria, Kingdom of Egypt
- Awards: Medal of Military Duty

Mourad Mouwafi or Muwafi (Arabic: مراد موافي; born 2 February 1950) is an Egyptian politician and major-general. Mouwafi was also the governor of Northern Sinai during a 2011 uprising in the region. He was appointed the Director of the Egyptian Intelligence shortly before the end of the Mubarak regime. He was dismissed by former President Mohamed Morsi from the position on 8 August 2012.

== Early life and education ==
- Joined Abbassia High School for extraordinary achievers.
- Earned his high school diploma (Thanawia Amma) in 1968.
- Joined the Egyptian Military Academy, where he graduated in 1970 (class no.57).
- Joined Egyptian Special Forces (The Thunderbolt) and served for sixteen years.
- Earned a special certificate in special operations and climbing mountains from France.

== Positions ==
1. Participated in the War of Attrition.
2. Participated in the October war 1973.
3. Teacher in the Special Forces.
4. Wing Commander in the School of Special Forces.
5. Commander of an infantry battalion (1987–1989).
6. Seconded to an Arab country for four years in the framework of the exchange of military expertise during the Gulf War.
7. Brigade Commander (1993–1995).
8. Commander of the mechanic infantry division at the Second Army (1998–2000).
9. Director of the Military Intelligence Service.
10. Governor of Northern Sinai (January 2010–January 2011).
11. Appointed as a Director of the Egyptian Intelligence by former President Hosni Mubarak on 31 January 2011 after the previous Director Omar Suleiman was appointed as a Vice President.

== Awards ==
1. The decoration of the Republic of Egypt of the second level
2. Order of Military Duty of the second level
3. Long Service and Good Example Medal
4. Order of Duty of the first level
5. Medal of Excellent Service
6. Medal of Great Chevalier from the President of the Republic of France

== Family life ==
Mourad Mouwafi married in 1978 and had three children.

== Dismissal ==
In 2012, a deadly attack was carried out by suspected Islamists near the Gaza-Israel-Egypt border. Mouwafi revealed that Israel's General Intelligence has provided information to all relevant state authorities on the plot to assassinate 17 Egyptian recruits during the month of Ramadan at mealtime in the Egyptian Rafah. As a result, former President Mohamed Morsi dismissed him from his position as Director of the Intelligence on 8 August 2012.

== Politics ==
Moufawi was involved with electoral alliance plans during the 2015 Egyptian parliamentary election. It was reported that he intended to establish his own political party that would support Abdel-Fattah al-Sisi should he win the election. Later, Mouwafi was floated as one of the names being supported by the United Arab Emirates to replace al-Sisi based on leaked strategy document.
