= Mohamed ElBaradei =

Egyptian law scholar (born 1942)

- محمد البرادعي
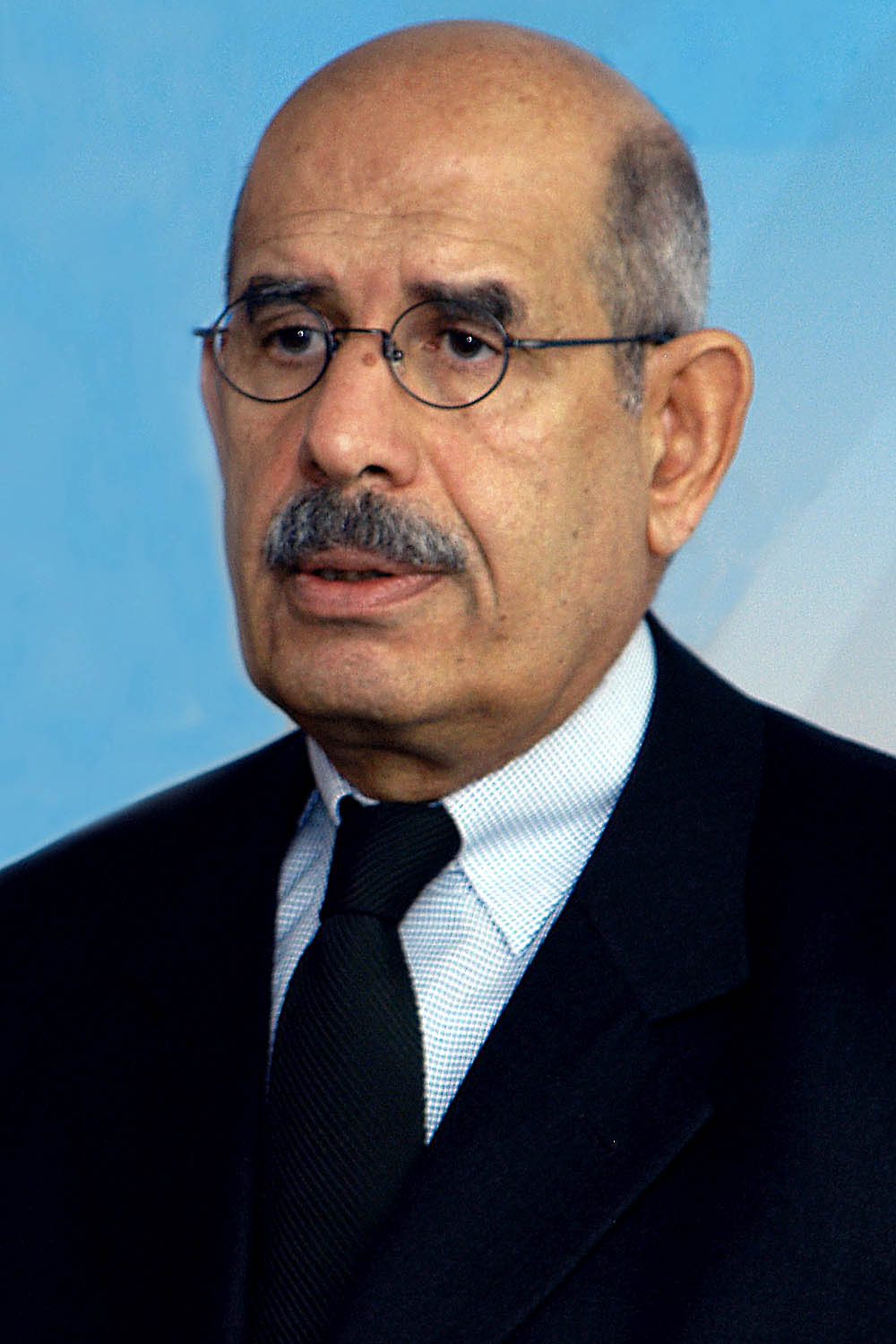
- ElBaradei in 2005

Interim Vice President of Egypt
- In office 14 July 2013 – 14 August 2013
- President: Adly Mansour (interim)
- Preceded by: Mahmoud Mekki
- Succeeded by: Vacant

Leader of the Constitution Party
- In office 28 April 2012 – 14 August 2013
- Deputy: George Isaac
- Preceded by: Office established
- Succeeded by: Sayyed Kassam (acting); Hala Shukrallah

4th Director General of the International Atomic Energy Agency
- In office 1 December 1997 – 30 November 2009
- Preceded by: Hans Blix
- Succeeded by: Yukiya Amano

Personal details
- Born: Mohamed Mostafa ElBaradei; 17 June 1942 (age 84) Cairo, Egypt
- Party: Constitution Party
- Spouse: Aida El Kashef
- Children: 2
- Education: Cairo University; Graduate Institute of International and Development Studies; New York University
- Website: Official website

Mohamed Mostafa ElBaradei (Arabic: محمد مصطفى البرادعي, romanized: Muḥammad Muṣṭafá al-Barādaʿī, Egyptian Arabic: [mæˈħæmːæd mosˈtˤɑfɑ (ʔe)lbæˈɾædʕi]; born 17 June 1942) is an Egyptian lawyer, diplomat, and politician who served as Director General of the International Atomic Energy Agency (IAEA) from 1997 to 2009 and as interim vice president of Egypt in 2013.

As Director General of the IAEA, ElBaradei oversaw the agency during inspections in Iraq preceding the 2003 invasion of Iraq and disputes over the nuclear programs of Iran and North Korea. He and the IAEA were jointly awarded the Nobel Peace Prize in 2005 "for their efforts to prevent nuclear energy from being used for military purposes and to ensure that nuclear energy for peaceful purposes is used in the safest possible way".

After leaving the IAEA, ElBaradei founded the National Association for Change and became a prominent opposition figure during the 2011 Egyptian revolution. Following the 2013 Egyptian coup d'état, ElBaradei was appointed vice president but resigned in protest over the Rabaa massacre.

== Education and early career ==
ElBaradei was born and raised in Giza Governorate, Greater Cairo, Egypt. He was one of five children of Mostafa ElBaradei, an attorney who headed the Egyptian Bar Association. ElBaradei's father was also a supporter of democratic rights in Egypt, supporting a free press and an independent judiciary.

Following in the footsteps of his father, Mostafa, ElBaradei also studied law. He earned a bachelor's degree in law from the University of Cairo in 1962, a master's degree LLM in 1971 and a doctorate degree JSD in international law in 1974 from the New York University School of Law. His thesis was titled "The right of passage through straits in time of peace".

ElBaradei's diplomatic career began in 1964 in the Ministry of Foreign Affairs, where he served in the Permanent Missions of Egypt to the UN in New York and in Geneva, in charge of political, legal, and arms-control issues. From 1974 to 1978, he was a special assistant to the foreign minister. In 1980, he became a senior fellow in charge of the International Law Program at the United Nations Institute for Training and Research (UNITAR). From 1981 to 1987, he was also an adjunct professor of international law at the New York University School of Law.

In 1984, ElBaradei became a senior staff member of the IAEA Secretariat, serving as the agency's legal adviser (1984 to 1993) and Assistant Director General for External Relations (1993 to 1997). ElBaradei is currently a member of both the International Law Association (ILA) and the American Society of International Law (ASIL).

== Public career as IAEA Director General (1997–2009) ==
ElBaradei's tenure has been marked by high-profile, non-proliferation issues, which include the inspections in Iraq preceding the March 2003 invasion, and tensions over the nuclear program of Iran.

ElBaradei began to serve as Director General of the IAEA, which is based in Vienna, on 1 December 1997, succeeding Hans Blix of Sweden. The agency gradually came to take an active role in attempts to prevent nuclear proliferation, with its focus first centred on Iraq and Sudan, in which cases the agency claimed success, and later also on North Korea and Iran. ElBaradei was re-elected for two more four-year terms in 2001 and, despite opposition from the United States, to a third term in 2005.

In late August 2007, ElBaradei finalized a secret "divisive and risky" nuclear agreement with Iran. Diplomats from the U.S., France, Britain, and Germany filed a formal protest.

In 2009 ElBaradei stated that Iran's nuclear threat had been exaggerated and there was no evidence the country was close to building a nuclear weapon. He also rejected accusations that he had concealed Iran's nuclear ambitions. His third and last term ended in November 2009. ElBaradei faced criticism from Washington, Israel, London, Berlin, and Paris, where officials saw his actions as attempts to block their efforts to intensify pressure on Iran regarding its nuclear program.

=== First term as Director General ===
After being appointed by the IAEA General Conference in 1997, ElBaradei said in his speech that, "for international organizations to enjoy the confidence and support of their members, they have to be responsive to [members'] needs; show concrete achievements; conduct their activities in a cost-effective manner; and respect a process of equitable representation, transparency, and open dialogue."

Just a couple of months before ElBaradei took office, the Model Additional Protocol was adopted, creating a new environment for IAEA verification by giving it greater authority to look for undeclared nuclear activities. When in office, ElBaradei launched a program to establish "integrated safeguards" combining the IAEA's comprehensive safeguard agreements with the newly adopted Additional Protocol. In his statement to the General Conference in 1998, he called upon all states to conclude the Additional Protocol: "One of the main purposes of the strengthened-safeguards system can be better achieved with global adherence. I would, therefore, urge all states with outstanding-safeguards agreements to conclude them, and I would also urge all states to accelerate their consideration of the Model Additional Protocol and enter into consultations with the Agency at the earliest possible opportunity. We should work together to ensure that, by the year 2000, all states [will] have concluded outstanding-safeguards agreements and also the Additional Protocol." ElBaradei repeated this call through his years as the Director General of the IAEA. In November 2009, 93 countries had Additional Protocols in force.

ElBaradei's first term ended in November 2001, just two months after the terrorist attacks of 9/11. These attacks made clear that the more is needed to be done to protect nuclear material and installations from theft or a terrorist attack. Consequently, ElBaradei established a nuclear security program to combat the risk of nuclear terrorism by assisting member states to strengthen the protection of their nuclear and radioactive material and installations, the Nuclear Security Fund.

=== Second term as Director General ===
One of the major issues during ElBaradei's second term as the director general of the IAEA was the agency's inspections in Iraq. ElBaradei disputed the U.S. rationale for the 2003 invasion of Iraq from the time of the 2002 Iraq disarmament crisis, when he, along with Hans Blix, led a team of UN weapons inspectors in Iraq. ElBaradei told the UN Security Council in March 2003 that documents purporting to show that Iraq had tried to acquire uranium from Niger were not authentic.

In an October 2003 interview published in the Cairo Times, he said "the ultimate sense of security will be when we come to recognize that we are all part of one human race. Our primary allegiance is to the human race and not to one particular color or border. I think the sooner we renounce the sanctity of these many identities and try to identify ourselves with the human race the sooner we will get a better world and a safer world.

ElBaradei described the U.S. invasion of Iraq as "a glaring example of how, in many cases, the use of force exacerbates the problem rather than [solves] it." ElBaradei further stated that "we learned from Iraq that an inspection takes time, that we should be patient, that an inspection can, in fact, work," and that he had "been validated" in concluding that Saddam Hussein had not revived his nuclear weapons program.

In a 2004 op-ed piece on the dangers of nuclear proliferation, in the New York Times (12 February 2004), ElBaradei stated that "[w]e must abandon the unworkable notion that it is morally reprehensible for some countries to pursue weapons of mass destruction, yet morally acceptable for others to rely on them for security – and indeed to continue to refine their capacities and postulate plans for their use." He went on to say "If the world does not change course, we risk self-destruction."

=== Third and final term as Director General ===
The United States initially voiced opposition to his election to a third four-year term in 2005. In a May 2005 interview with the staff of the U.S. Senate Foreign Relations Committee, Lawrence Wilkerson, the chief of staff to former U.S. Secretary of State Colin Powell, charged former Undersecretary of State for Arms Control and International Security John Bolton with an underhanded campaign to unseat ElBaradei. "Mr. Bolton overstepped his bounds in his moves and gyrations to try to keep [ElBaradei] from being reappointed as [IAEA] head," Wilkerson said. The Washington Post reported in December 2004 that the Bush administration had intercepted dozens of ElBaradei's phone calls with Iranian diplomats and was scrutinizing them for evidence [that] they could use to force him out. IAEA spokesman Mark Gwozdecky said the agency worked on "the assumption that one or more entities may be listening to our conversations." "It's not how we would prefer to work, but it is the reality. At the end of the day, we have nothing to hide," he said. Iran responded to the Washington Post reports by accusing the U.S. of violating international law in intercepting the communications.

The United States was the only country to oppose ElBaradei's reappointment and eventually failed to win enough support from other countries to oust ElBaradei. On 9 June 2005, after a meeting between U.S. Secretary of State Condoleezza Rice and ElBaradei, the United States dropped its objections. Among countries that supported ElBaradei were China, Russia, Germany, and France. China praised his leadership and objectivity, and supported him for doing "substantial fruitful work, which has maintained the agency's role and credit in international non-proliferation and promoted the development of peaceful use of nuclear energy. His work has been universally recognized in the international community. China appreciates Mr. El Baradei's work and supports his reelection as the agency's director general." France, Germany, and some developing countries, have made clear their support for ElBaradei as well. Russia issued a strong statement in favor of re-electing him as soon as possible.

ElBaradei was unanimously re-appointed by the IAEA board on 13 June 2005.

=== Comments on no fourth term ===
In 2008, ElBaradei said that he would not be seeking a fourth term as director general. Moreover, he said, in an IAEA document, that he was "not available for a further term" in office. In its first five rounds of voting, the IAEA Board of Governors was split in its decision regarding the next director general. ElBaradei said, "I just hope that the agency has a candidate acceptable to all—north, south, east, west—because that is what is needed." After several rounds of voting, on 3 July 2009, Mr. Yukiya Amano, Japanese ambassador to the IAEA, was elected as the next IAEA director general.

=== ElBaradei and U.S. relations ===
ElBaradei, leader of the National Coalition for Change, has been a major voice for democratic change in Egypt since 2009 and was a significant leader during the 2011 protests. His views have sometimes conflicted with those of the U.S. government and its foreign policy objectives in the Middle East. During his tenure as Director General of the IAEA (1997–2009), ElBaradei was cautious about claims of possible military dimensions to Iran's nuclear program, and was critical of the possibility that the US and others would launch military action against Iran. According to a 3 July 2003 article in Time magazine, ElBaradei stated that Iraq's nuclear program had not restarted before the 2003 Iraq War, contradicting claims by the Bush administration. He told the German news magazine Der Spiegel on 12 July 2010 that he wanted to open the Gaza Strip – Egypt border and accused Israel of being the biggest threat to the Middle East because of their nuclear weapons.

ElBaradei has called for international criminal investigation of former Bush administration officials for their roles in planning the war on Iraq.

=== Multinational control of the nuclear fuel cycle ===
In an op-ed that he wrote for the Economist in 2003, ElBaradei outlined his idea for the future of the nuclear fuel cycle. His suggestion was to "limit the processing of weapon-usable material in civilian nuclear programs, as well as the production of new material, by agreeing to restrict these operations exclusively to facilities under multinational control." Also, "nuclear-energy systems should be deployed that, by design, avoid the use of materials that may be applied directly to making nuclear weapons." He concluded by saying that "considerable advantages would be gained from international co-operation in these stages of the nuclear-fuel cycle. These initiatives would not simply add more non-proliferation controls, to limit access to weapon-usable nuclear material; they would also provide access to the benefits of nuclear technology for more people in more countries."

Non-nuclear-weapon states have been reluctant to embrace these proposals due to a perception that the commercial or strategic interests of nuclear-weapon states motivate the proposals, a perception that the proposals produce a dependency on a limited number of nuclear fuel suppliers, and a concern that the proposal restricts their unalienable right to use nuclear energy for peaceful purposes.

=== Technical cooperation and cancer control ===
ElBaradei's work does not only concentrate on nuclear verification. Another very important aspect is development through nuclear technology. In 2004, ElBaradei sponsored a comprehensive global initiative—the Programme of Action for Cancer Therapy (PACT)—to fight cancer. In one of his statements, ElBaradei said: "A silent crisis in cancer treatment persists in developing countries and is intensifying every year. At least 50 to 60 percent of cancer victims can benefit from radiotherapy, but most developing countries do not have enough radiotherapy machines or sufficient numbers of specialized doctors and other health professionals." In the first year of operation, PACT provided cancer-treatment capacity in seven member states, using the IAEA's share of the 2005 Nobel Peace Prize.

In his speech to the 2008 General Conference, ElBaradei said that "development activities remain central to our work. Our resources have long been insufficient to keep pace with requests for support, and we have increasingly made use of partnerships with other organizations, regional collaborations and country-to-country support. I again emphasize that technical cooperation is not a bargaining chip, part of a political 'balance' between the development and safeguards activities of the agency."

== International Crisis Group ==
ElBaradei served on the board of trustees of the International Crisis Group, a non-governmental organization that enjoys an annual budget of over $15 million and is bankrolled by the Carnegie, the Ford Foundation, the Bill & Melinda Gates Foundation, as well as George Soros' Open Society Institute. Soros himself serves as a member of the organization's executive committee.

== Egyptian politics ==
=== 2011 Egyptian revolution ===
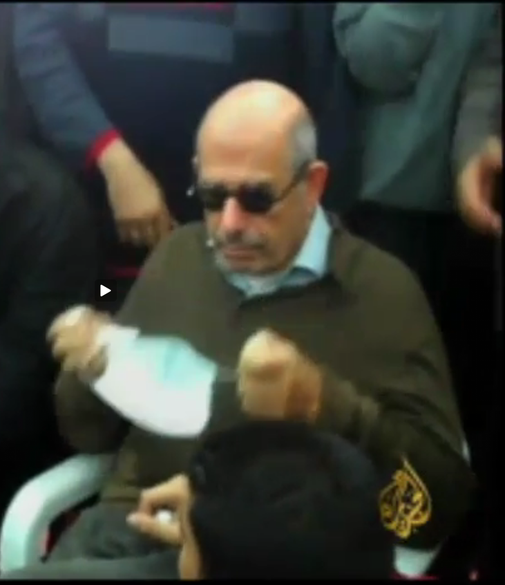
Mohammed ElBaradei during Friday of Anger

During the early days of the Egyptian Revolution, ElBaradei's speechwriter and long-time associate Laban Coblentz and other IAEA colleagues of ElBaradei contradicted the notion that ElBaradei had only recently become engaged in Egyptian politics, saying he had never relinquished his focus on human rights deficiencies in his home country. Coblentz noted that ElBaradei had first confronted Mubarak in early 2003, during the lead-up to the Iraq War, as well as on subsequent encounters.

Coblentz also pointed out the role that social media played in convincing ElBaradei that the young people of Egypt were ready for change: "It was really this last 14 months, where someone I knew as not being particularly computer savvy, taught himself to use Facebook and Twitter and YouTube and started to do in virtual space what was forbidden to do by the Mubarak regime, the freedom of assembly by large groups."

While speaking at the Harvard Kennedy School on 27 April 2010, ElBaradei joked that he is "looking for a job" and is seeking to be an "agent of change and an advocate for democracy" within Egyptian politics. He also made clear that his wife is not very enthusiastic about any potential run.

On 27 January 2011, ElBaradei returned to Egypt amid ongoing turmoil, with the largest mass protests in 30 years, which had begun two days earlier, on 25 January 2011. ElBaradei declared himself ready to lead a transitional government if that was the will of the nation, saying that, "If [people] want me to lead the transition, I will not let them down." Subsequently, "when he joined protesters Friday after noon prayers, police fired water cannons at him and his supporters. They used batons to beat some of ElBaradei's supporters, who surrounded him to protect him." On 28 January 2011, ElBaradei was reported to have been placed under house arrest in Egypt. However, the next day, when he was interviewed by Al Jazeera, he said that he was unaware of any such arrest.

Later on, ElBaradei arrived in Tahrir Square to join thousands of other protesters against the Mubarak regime and spoke directly to the people, stating that they "have taken back [their] rights" and that they cannot go back. A number of Egyptian political movements have called on ElBaradei to form a transitional government. ElBaradei has also stated that "the people [of Egypt] want the regime to fall." In response to the appointment of Omar Suleiman as the new vice president of Egypt, ElBaradei stated that it was a "hopeless, desperate attempt by Mubarak to stay in power. I think [that] it is loud and clear...that Mubarak has to leave today." Additionally, ElBaradei restated his position that, when Egypt does become a democratic nation, "there is no reason to believe that a democracy in Egypt would not lead to a better relationship with the US based on respect and equity."

The Guardian reported that ElBaradei had been mandated by the Muslim Brotherhood and four other opposition groups to negotiate an interim "national salvation government." However, BBC reported that the Muslim Brotherhood, the largest opposition party banned by Mubarak's regime, had not consented to the choice of ElBaradei as the representative of the opposition. "The people have not appointed Mohamed ElBaradei to become a spokesman of them. The Muslim Brotherhood is much stronger than Mohamed ElBaradei as a person. And we do not agree [that he should represent] this movement. The movement is represented by itself, and it will [appoint] a committee...to [delegate its representatives]."

His appointment was controversial largely because of the long periods that he has spent outside the country. His appointment was seen as a recognition of the importance of various Western nations' support of the revolts.

=== Possible presidential candidacy ===
ElBaradei's name was circulated by opposition groups from 2009 to 2012 as a possible candidate to succeed President Hosni Mubarak in Egypt's highest executive position when his name was suggested by Mohamed Hassanein Heikal.

ElBaradei did not make any clear statements regarding his intentions to run for the office; however, he has demanded that certain conditions be met to ensure fair elections accompanied by changes to the constitution that will allow more freedom for independent candidates before he would actually consider running for the presidency. Several opposition groups have endorsed him, considering him a neutral figure who could transition the country to greater democracy.

On 24 February 2010, ElBaradei met with several opposition leaders and notable intellectuals at his home in Cairo. The meeting was concluded with an announcement for the formation of a new non-party-political movement called the "National Association for Change." The movement aims for general reforms in the political scene and mainly article 76 of the Egyptian constitution, which places restrictions on free presidential elections, especially when it comes to independent candidates. The banned political group, the Muslim Brotherhood, was represented at the meeting by one of its key figures; however, its stand in accepting a non-member of its group as a representative is still unclear. It is also unknown whether Amr Moussa, the head of the Arab League who met with ElBaradei a day earlier, will be part of the new movement.

On 7 March 2011 it was announced that ElBaradei intended to run for the presidential elections, this intention was later clearly stated in a live interview by ElBaradei to the ON TV channel 10 March 2011. On 14 January 2012 ElBaradei declared he would not run for president.

On 4 July 2013 ElBaradei was mentioned as a favorite to head a transitional Egyptian government amid the 2013 Egyptian coup d'état as the prime minister.

=== President of Constitution Party ===
On 28 April 2012, ElBaradei launched the Constitution Party. This date was too late to allow him to run for the presidency. The party claims itself as liberal, in order to protect and promote the principles and objectives of the 25 January 2011 Revolution according to liberal ideals. ElBaradei became a prominent figure of the Egyptian opposition. On 24 November, the party, together with secular parties, formed the National Salvation Front, a coalition of the primary opposition parties against President Mohamed Morsi's decrees. On 5 December 2012, he became the coordinator of National Salvation Front. He resigned as head of the party in July 2013.

=== Vice president ===
Mohamed ElBaradei was involved in the coup d'état that toppled democratically elected President Mohamed Morsi amid mass protests against the perceived mismanagement of the country, the refusal of Morsi to form a coalition government, and the authoritarian influence of the Muslim Brotherhood on what had been a secular Muslim-majority state for decades. He was described by Reuters as the "designated negotiator" for the political opposition. ElBaradei gave support to the military's plan to oust Morsi and begin implementing a "political road map" for Egypt, including the installation of Supreme Constitutional Court Chief Justice Adly Mansour as interim president of Egypt. He was present when General Sisi announced the temporary suspension of the constitution and the removal of Morsi from power.

In the political transition following Morsi's ejection from the presidency, ElBaradei was immediately mentioned as a candidate for interim prime minister. He reportedly denied interest in the position at first. There were reports that ElBaradei would be named prime minister, which were retracted after objections by the Nour Party, on 7 July. He was sworn in as vice president, responsible for international relations, on 14 July 2013.

==== 14 August government raids and resignation ====
On 14 August 2013, following a violent crackdown by security forces on supporters of deposed president Mohamed Morsi, in which at least 525 people were killed, ElBaradei resigned as vice president. In his resignation letter, ElBaradei stated: "...I always saw peaceful alternatives for resolving this societal wrangling. Certain solutions were proposed, which could have led to national conciliation, but things have come this far... It has become difficult for me to continue bearing the responsibility for decisions with which I do not agree and the consequences of which I fear. I cannot bear the responsibility for a single drop of blood before God, before my own conscience or the citizens..." He then left the country for Vienna, where he was previously based as Director General of The International Atomic Energy Agency.

After his resignation, an Egyptian law professor at Helwan University, Sayyed Ateeq, filed lawsuit against ElBaradei, accusing him of a "betrayal of trust". As Ateeq told Reuters, "Dr. ElBaradei was entrusted with this position and he had a duty to go back to those who entrusted him and ask to resign." The case was heard in Cairo in October that year, and dismissed.

== Other activities ==
Mohamed ElBaradei is a Member of the Global Leadership Foundation, an organization that works to support democratic leadership, prevent and resolve conflict through mediation and promote good governance in the form of democratic institutions, open markets, human rights and the rule of law. It does so by making available, discreetly and in confidence, the experience of former leaders to today's national leaders. It is a not-for-profit organization composed of former heads of government, senior governmental and international organization officials who work closely with heads of government on governance-related issues of concern to them.

ElBaradei is a member of the Global Commission on Drug Policy.

== Personal life ==
ElBaradei is married to Aida El Kashef, a former early-childhood teacher. They have two children.

A native speaker of Arabic, ElBaradei is also fluent in English and French, and knows "enough German to get by, at least in Vienna."

== Awards ==
During his tenure as director general of the International Atomic Energy Agency, ElBaradei received many awards for his efforts to ensure that nuclear energy is used for peaceful purposes.

=== 2005 Nobel Peace Prize ===
On 7 October 2005, ElBaradei and the IAEA were announced as joint recipients of the Nobel Peace Prize for their "efforts to prevent nuclear energy from being used for military purposes and to ensure that nuclear energy, for peaceful purposes, is used in the safest possible way." ElBaradei donated all of his winnings to building orphanages in Cairo. The IAEA's winnings are being spent to train scientists from developing countries to use nuclear techniques in combating cancer and malnutrition. ElBaradei is the fourth Egyptian to receive the Nobel Prize, following Anwar Sadat (1978 in Peace), Naguib Mahfouz (1988 in Literature), and Ahmed Zewail (1999 in Chemistry).

In his Nobel lecture, ElBaradei said that the changing landscape of nuclear non-proliferation and disarmament may be defined by the emergence of an extensive black market in nuclear material and equipment, the proliferation of nuclear weapons and sensitive nuclear technology, and the stagnation in nuclear disarmament. To combat proliferation, ElBaradei has suggested keeping nuclear and radiological material out of the hands of extremist groups, tightening control over the operations for producing the nuclear material that could be used in weapons, and accelerating disarmament efforts. ElBaradei also stated that only one percent of the money spent to develop new weapons would be enough to feed the entire world and that, if we hope to escape self-destruction, nuclear weapons should have no place in our collective conscience and no role in our security.

UN Secretary General Kofi Annan said that he was delighted that the 2005 Nobel Peace Prize had been awarded to the UN nuclear watchdog and its head, ElBaradei. "The secretary general congratulates him and the entire staff of the agency, past and present, on their contributions to global peace," a spokesman for Annan said.

==== Postage issues ====
Egypt Post on 8 October 2005 commemorated this award by issuing a set of two postage stamps. On 1 June 2009, to commemorate 4th Extraordinary Session of PAPU Plenipotentiary Conference held in Cairo between 1 and 9 June, Egypt Post issued a set of 16 stamps bearing African winners of Nobel Prizes, among which one is of ElBaradei

=== Other awards and recognition ===
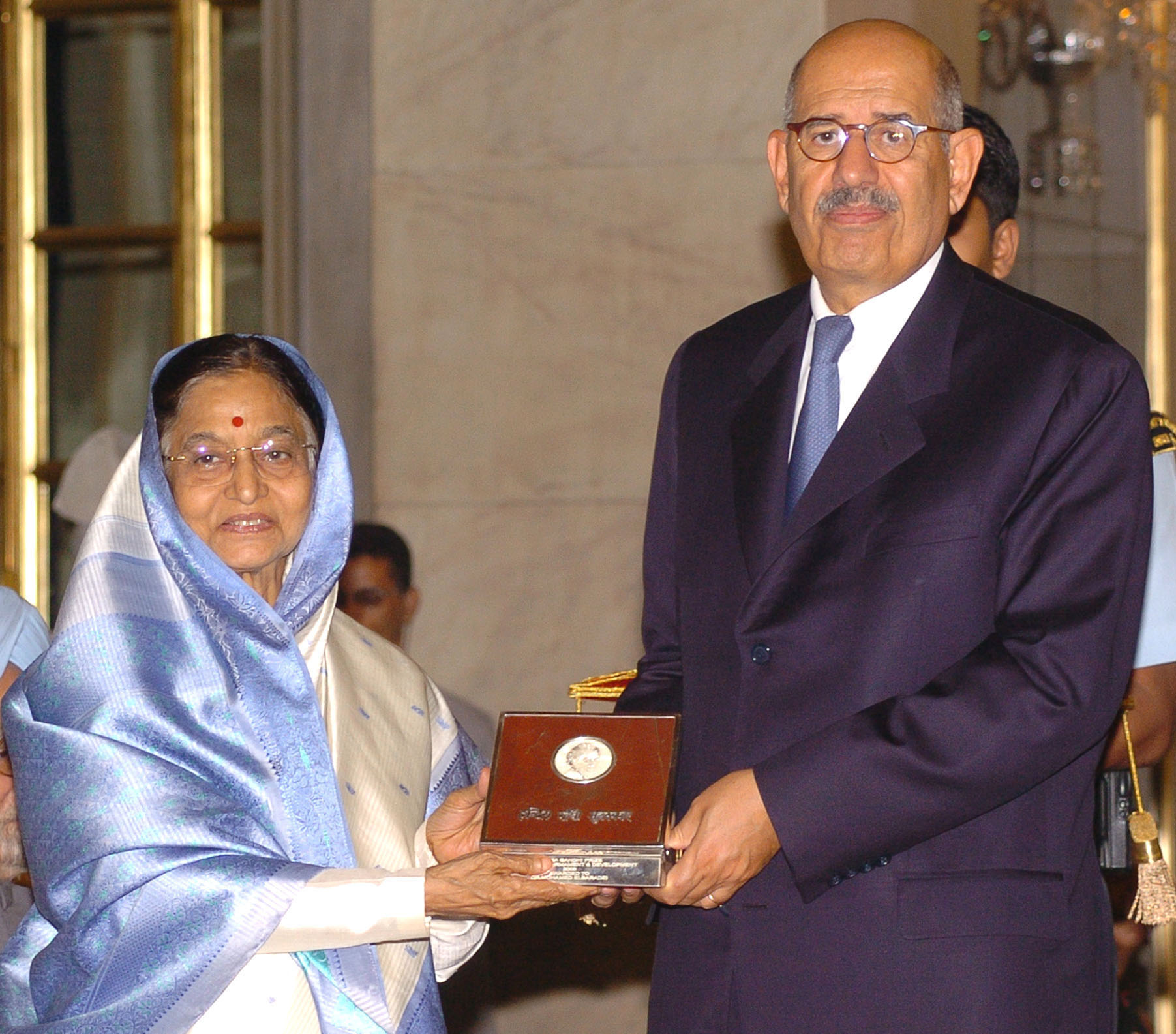
Pratibha Devisingh Patil giving away the Indira Gandhi Prize for Peace, Disarmament and Development-2008 to D.G., IAEA, Dr. Mohamed ElBaradei for his impassioned opposition to the use of Nuclear Energy for Military purpose

ElBaradei has received many awards for his work as director of the IAEA:

- Decoration for Services to the Republic of Austria (Grand Decoration in Gold with Sash) (2009)
- Order of Merit of the Federal Republic of Germany (Grand Cross with Star and Sash) (2010)
- "El Athir" award of the National Order of Merit, Algeria's one of the highest national distinction
- The Franklin D. Roosevelt Four Freedoms Award (2006)
- James Park Morton Interfaith Award
- Golden Plate award from the American Academy of Achievement
- Jit Trainor award from Georgetown University for distinction in the conduct of diplomacy
- Human Security award from the Muslim Public Affairs Council
- Prix de la Fondation award from the Crans Montana Forum
- Golden Dove of Peace prize from the President of Italy
- Honorary Patron of the University Philosophical Society (2006) of Trinity College, Dublin, following in the footsteps of previous Nobel Peace Prize Winners Desmond Tutu and John Hume
- Golden Doves for Peace journalistic prize awarded by the Italian Research Institute Archive Disarmo in 2007
- Grand Cordon of the Order of the Nile, the highest Egyptian civilian decoration, awarded by the Government of Egypt
- Award for Distinguished Contribution to the Peaceful Worldwide Use of Nuclear Technology, awarded by The World Nuclear Association in September 2007
- 2006: Freedom medal
- The Mostar 2007 international peace award of the Mostar Center for Peace and Multiethnic Cooperation
- The 2008 "Peacebuilding Award" of the EastWest Institute
- The International Seville NODO Prize for Peace, Security and Inter-Cultural Dialogue
- The 2008 Indira Gandhi Prize for Peace, Disarmament and Development
- The 2009 Delta Prize for Global Understanding, sponsored by the University of Georgia and Delta Air Lines
- The XIV International Grupo Compostela-Xunta de Galicia Prize
- Breastplate of the Russian Foreign Ministry "Contribution to International Cooperation"
- Order of Francisc Skorina (Belarus)
- Order of Friendship of Peoples (Belarus)

ElBaradei has also received honorary doctoral degrees from the University of Dublin, Trinity College; New York University; the University of Maryland; the American University in Cairo; the Free Mediterranean University (LUM) in Bari, Italy; Soka University of Japan; Tsinghua University of Beijing; the Polytechnic University of Bucharest; the Universidad Politecnica de Madrid; Konkuk University in Seoul; the University of Florence; the University of Buenos Aires; the National University of Cuyo in Argentina; Amherst College and Cairo University.

He is also a member of the Mo Ibrahim Foundation's Ibrahim Prize Committee.

== Publications ==
ElBaradei is the author or editor of several books:

- El Baradei, Mohamed. The Age of Deception: Nuclear Diplomacy in Treacherous Times. New York: Metropolitan Books/Henry Holt and Co, 2011. ISBN 9780805093506 According to WorldCat, the book is held in 915 libraries
  - Translated into Polish, German, Dutch, and Arabic
- El Baradei, Mohamed, E. I. Nwogugu, and John M. Rames., editors. The International Law of Nuclear Energy: Basic Documents. Dordrecht: M. Nijhoff, 1993.2 v.ISBN 9780792317470
- El Baradei, Mohamed. Atoms for Peace: A Pictorial History of the International Atomic Energy Agency, 1957-2007. Vienna: International Atomic Energy Agency, 2007. ISBN 9789201038074

== See also ==
- Asmaa Mahfouz
- Hossam el-Hamalawy
- International Atomic Energy Agency
- Mona Seif
- Wael Ghonim

Diplomatic posts
Preceded by Hans Blix	Director General of the International Atomic Energy Agency; 1997–2009	Succeeded by Yukiya Amano
Party political offices
New political party	Leader of the Constitution Party; 2012–2013	Succeeded by Hala Shukrallah
Political offices
Vacant Title last held by Mahmoud Mekki	Vice-President of Egypt; Interim; 2013	Succeeded by Vacant
Awards and achievements
Preceded by Wangari Maathai	Nobel Peace Prize Laureate; 2005; Served alongside: International Atomic Energy Agency	Succeeded by Muhammad Yunus
Preceded by Wangari Maathai	Nobel Peace Prize Laureate; 2005; Served alongside: International Atomic Energy Agency	Succeeded by Grameen Bank
