= Mahmoud Mekki =

Vice President of Egypt from August 2012 to December 2012

- محمود مكي
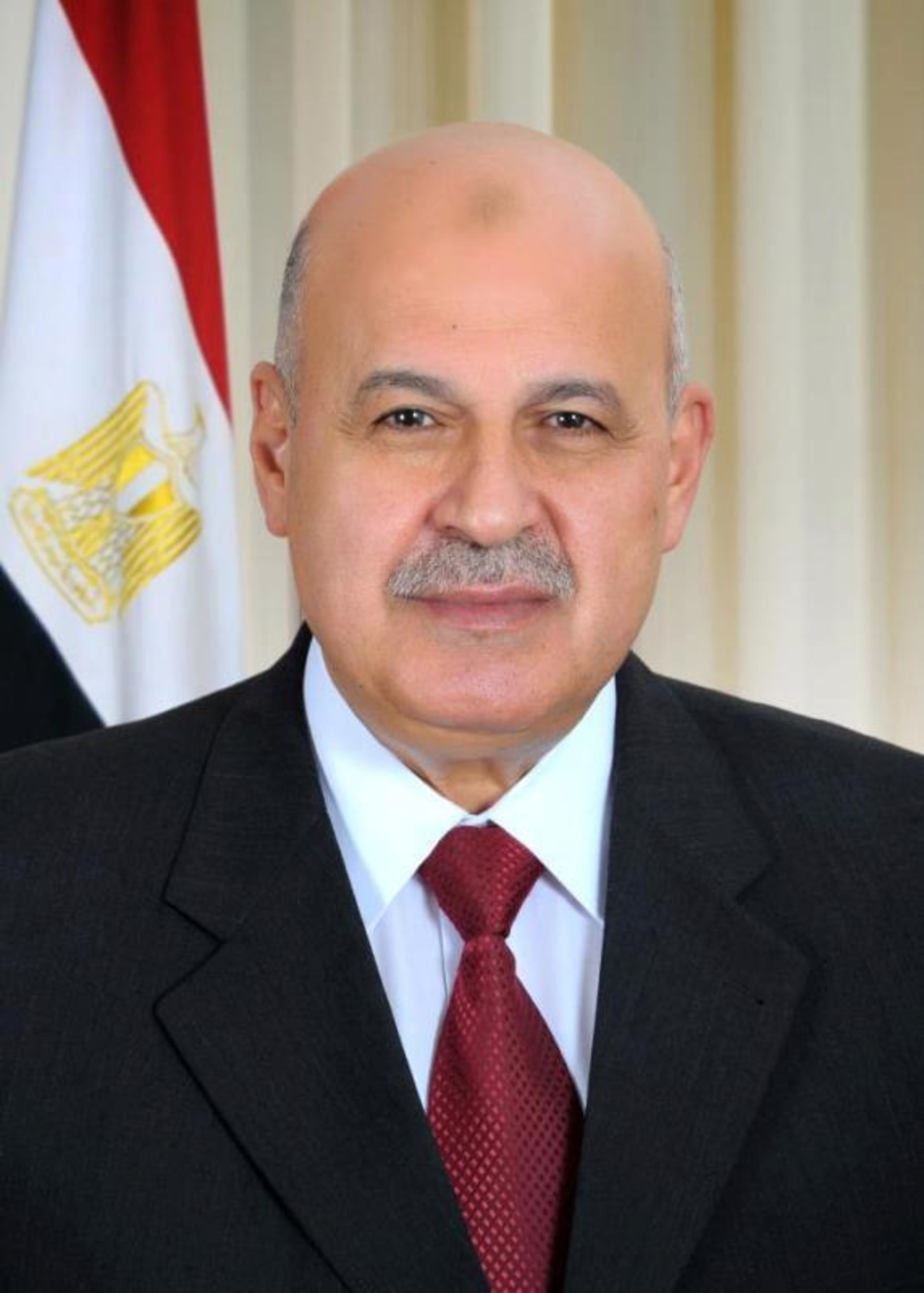
- Official portrait, 2012

9th Vice President of Egypt
- In office 12 August 2012 – 22 December 2012
- President: Mohamed Morsi
- Preceded by: Omar Suleiman
- Succeeded by: Mohamed ElBaradei (interim)

Personal details
- Born: 1954 (age 71–72) Alexandria, Egypt
- Party: Independent

Mahmoud Mekki (Arabic: محمود محمود أحمد مكي; born 1954) is an Egyptian politician who served as the ninth vice president of Egypt from August 2012 to December 2012. He was appointed by President Mohamed Morsi following the 2011 revolution and the 2012 presidential election on 12 August 2012. He was Egypt's first vice president from a civilian background rather than a military one. He resigned from his post on 22 December 2012.

== Early life and education ==
Mekki was born in Alexandria in 1954. After graduating from police college in Cairo he worked as a police officer in Central Security Forces. He then got a bachelor's degree in law and worked in general prosecution (Arabic: النيابة العامة). A few years later, Mekki became a judge. Working his way up the judicial ladder, he was eventually appointed vice-president of the Court of Cassation (Arabic: محكمه النقض)., which represents the final stage of criminal appeal in Egypt.

He is younger brother of Ahmed Mekki, the former minister of justice in the Qandil Cabinet.

== Career ==
Since the mid-1980s, Mekki, along with a large number of Egypt's judges, were engaged in advocating judicial independence, an idea which was brought to light at the time by Yehia Rifai, Chairman of the Egyptian Judges' Club at the time. Brothers Ahmed and Mahmoud Makky alongside Hossam Ghariani and others were demanding separation of the executive authority over courts and the transfer of judicial inspection to the Supreme judicial Council.

Makky headed the follow-up elections in the Judges' Club, and coordinator of the movement of the independent judges. In 2006, he led demonstrations for independence of the judiciary from the executive. Makky also demanded the amendment of article 76 of the Egyptian constitution to allow multiple presidential candidates to run for elections. In 1992, Makky headed a strike by judges to request the release of two judges who they claimed had been unfairly detained.

In 2005, Makky was arrested and tried. During the trial of Makky in 2005, the Muslim Brotherhood showed intense solidarity with him during the trial. Salim Al-Awa and a large number of lawyers pleaded with him. In 2006, he was cleared of the charge.

Makky had a popular position in 2006 when he surprised the judges and the broad masses huddled in front of the High Court after the end of the first session of the disciplinary trial for Makky and ran quickly towards Major General Ismail Shaer, director of Cairo security. He held him by his hands and said to him "Do you know Omar?", Shaer replied "Yes, he is my late son," Makky replied "If you really remember him, then pray from him and stop police brutality against youth demonstrators since they are all the same age of your late son." People who saw the incident said that Shaer nearly cried while he listened to these words.

In 2010, he moved to Kuwait, and was appointed vice-president of Kuwait's Court of Cassation. He returned to Egypt in August 2012 upon the proposal by President Morsi to be his deputy. On 22 December 2012, Mekki resigned from his post, stating that "I have realized a while ago that the nature of politics does not suit my professional background as a judge." The post of vice presidency of Egypt was also abolished after the constitutional referendum in December 2012. However, after the overthrow of President Mohamed Morsi in the 2013 Egyptian coup d'état, the position of the vice presidency was briefly restored by Acting President Adly Mansour, who appointed Mohamed ElBaradei to the post of acting vice president on 7 July 2013. After his resignation Makky assumed the role of the chairman of a national dialogue forum to consolidate political forces with the Qandil cabinet.

President Morsi appointed Makky as Egypt's Ambassador to the Vatican City on 17 January 2013.

Political offices
Vacant Title last held by Omar Suleiman	Vice-President of Egypt; 2012	Vacant Title next held by Mohamed ElBaradei; Interim
