= Khaled Megawer =

Egyptian military intelligence agency director

Major General Khaled Megawer
- خالد مجاور
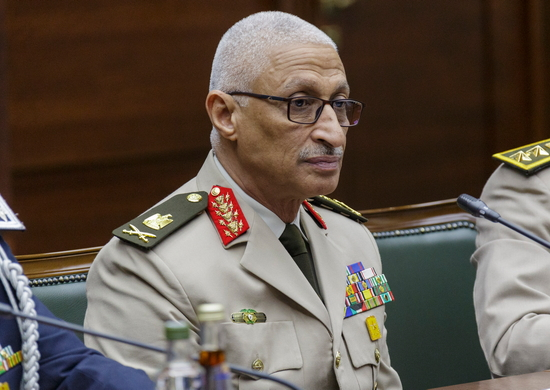

Director of the Military Intelligence and Reconnaissance Administration
- Incumbent
- Assumed office December 2018
- President: Abdel Fattah el-Sisi
- Preceded by: Muhammad Farag El-Shahat

Military service
- Allegiance: Egypt
- Branch/service: Egyptian Army
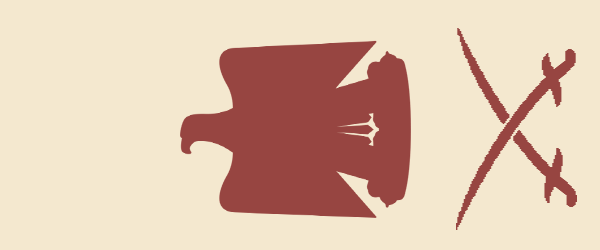
- Rank: Major General
- Commands: Military Intelligence Directorate; Second Field Army; Military attaché
- Battles/wars: Sinai Insurgency

Major General Khaled Megawer (Arabic: خالد مجاور) is the current Director of the Egyptian Military Intelligence and Reconnaissance Administration. He was appointed in December 2018. He also assumed the position of Assistant Minister of Defense of Egypt for Foreign Affairs.

== Career ==
Megawer served as the Egyptian Military Attaché at the Egyptian embassy in the United States in Washington. He then returned to Egypt to serve as the chief of staff of the Second Field Army. He assumed formal command of the Second Army in May 2017.

After transferring to the Military Intelligence Administration, he was promoted to the deputy director position under Major General Muhammad Farag El-Shahat in September 2018, he then was promoted to the Director position in December later that year.
