= General Intelligence Service (Egypt) =

Egyptian intelligence agency

General Intelligence Service (GIS)
- جهاز المخابرات العامة
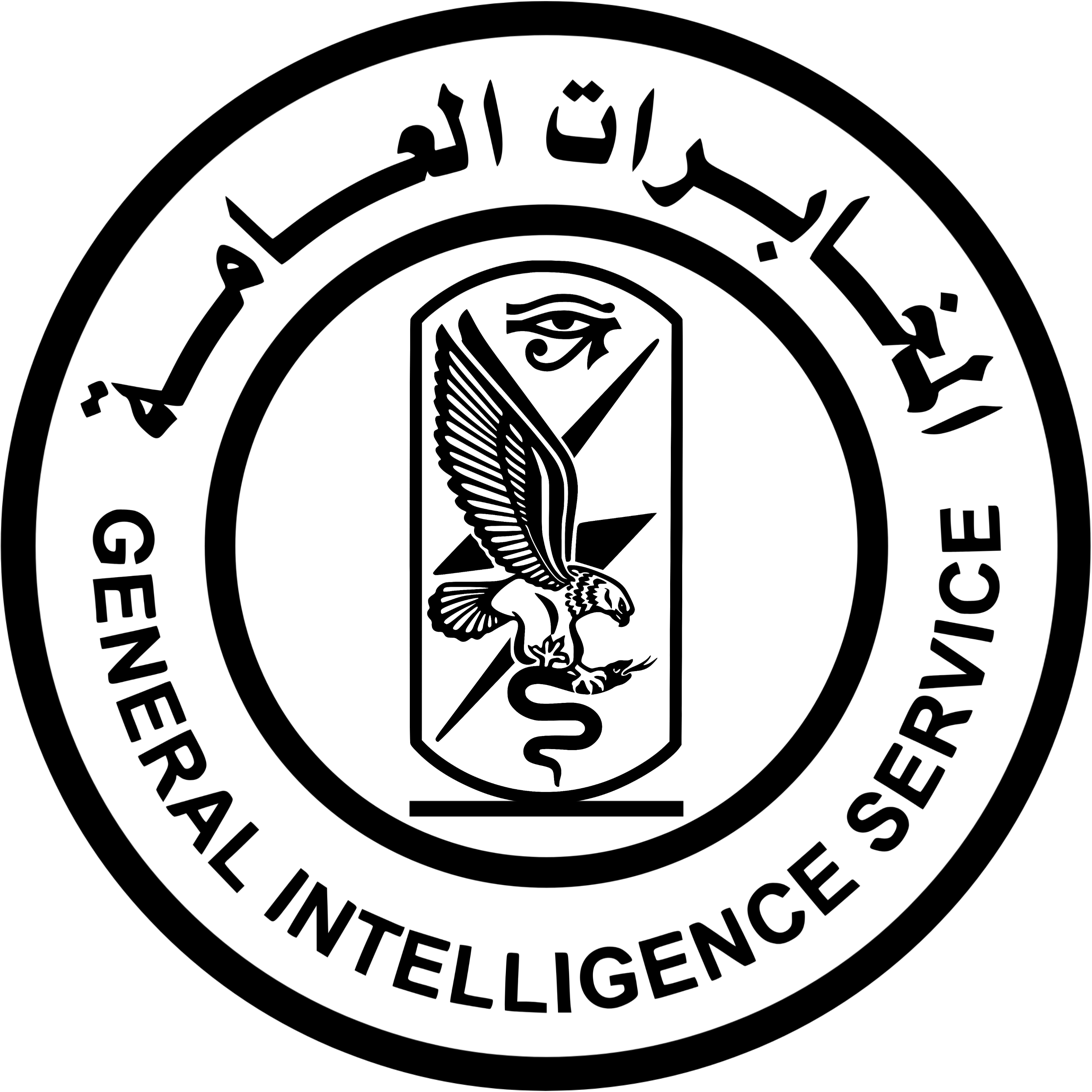
- Seal of the General Intelligence Service

Agency overview
- Formed: 1954; 72 years ago
- Jurisdiction: Government of Egypt
- Headquarters: Cairo, Egypt
- Agency executives: Hassan Rashad, Director; Nasser Fahmi, Deputy Director
- Parent agency: Presidency of Egypt

The General Intelligence Service (Egyptian Arabic: جهاز المخابرات العامة Gihaz El Mukhabarat El ‘Amma; GIS), often referred to as the Mukhabarat (Egyptian Arabic: المخابرات El Mukhabarat) is an Egyptian intelligence agency, and secret police force, responsible for providing national security intelligence, both domestically and internationally. The GIS is part of the Egyptian intelligence community, together with the office of Military Intelligence Authority (Egyptian Arabic: هيئة الاستخبارات العسكرية Hayyat Elaistikhbarat Eleaskaria) and National Security Sector (Egyptian Arabic: قطاع الأمن الوطني Ketaʿ El Amn El Watani).

== History ==
The decision to set up an Egyptian intelligence service was taken following the Egyptian Revolution of 1952, led by the Free Officers Movement, when Egypt was under increased threat from foreign adversaries, such as the United Kingdom, and the State of Israel. The General Intelligence Directorate was formally established by then Prime Minister, and future President, Gamal Abdel Nasser, in 1954, and placed under the command of Zakaria Mohieddin. It was formed with the help of the CIA that backed the Free Officers in their coup against King Farouk in the form of Project FF.

The agency's importance rose when Nasser assigned its command to Salah Nasr, who held the post of director of the GID from 1957 to 1967 and thoroughly reorganized the agency. Under Nasr's supervision, the GID relocated to its own building and established separate divisions for Radio, Computer, Forgery, and Black Operations. To cover the agency's expenses, Nasr set up Al Nasr Company, ostensibly an import-export firm, as a front organization. He played a very important role helping Algeria, Southern Yemen and many Arab and African states gain independence. Although the Egyptian foreign ministry was officially responsible for foreign affairs, GID initiated and aided many Arab and African movements for independence as a part of Gamal Abdel Nasser's anti-imperialist policies. Nasr established good relations with other intelligence agencies across the globe, which helped providing Egypt with wheat and establishing industries such as (Al Nasr Company for Motor Cars). One of his constructions is the Gezeera Tower in Cairo.

For several years, the name of GID director was a secret only known to high officials and government newspapers chief editors. However, Major General Omar Suleiman, who was the head of the GID from 1993 to January 2011, was the first one to break this taboo. His name was published before he himself became a known face in media after being envoyed by former Egyptian president Mubarak to Israel, US, and Gaza on several occasions.

On 31 January 2011, Major-General Murad Muwafi was declared the director of GID, after Omar Suleiman was appointed as a Vice President of Egypt and then resigned after former president Mubarak had to step down during the Egyptian revolution. He was replaced by Mohamed Raafat Shehata in August 2012 by president Mohamed Morsi.

In July 2013, as result of 2012–13 Egyptian protests, Mohamed Raafat Shehata was sacked by interim president Adly Mansour and was replaced by General Mohamed Ahmed Fareed al-Tohami.

At the beginning of his presidency in 2014, Abdel Fattah El-Sisi apparently had a difficult relationship with GIS. As a former head of military intelligence, his power base lay exclusively with the armed forces. With the appointment of his then office manager Abbas Kamel as head of GIS in 2018, the GIS was upgraded in terms of power politics. As a result of this personnel change, the president assigned the GIS more and more tasks in connection with the consolidation of his rule, probably also in order to become more independent from the Egyptian armed forces.

The service was already significantly involved in the preparation of the constitutional referendum in 2019, which enabled Sisi to extend his term of office. Since spring 2022, he has been involved in organizing the "National Dialogue", which, according to critics, simulates political participation without implementing actual reforms.

In addition, the service was given extensive powers by parliamentary resolution to set up its own commercial companies, a privilege that had previously been reserved for the military in this form.

In October 2023, the Egyptian intelligence service claimed that it had warned Israel 10 days before the incursion of Hamas fighters onto Israeli territory. Egypt's Intelligence Minister General Abbas Kamel personally warned the Netanjahu government that “something unusual, a terrible operation” is about to happen. The Ynet news site had distributed such information, which was rejected by Netanjahu as "totally faked news". The outlet claimed that Egypt's Intelligence Minister General Abbas Kamel was in direct communication with Israel before the Gaza war. Egyptian officials noted that the Israeli government was indifferent with regard to that warning and "submerged' in troubles with the West Bank. Later a U.S. senator and member of the United States House Committee on Foreign Affairs confirmed that warning by Egyptian intelligence three days prior to the event but mentioned that the warning was unspecific and therefore not heeded.

== Influence of GIS ==
The GIS is omnipresent in Egypt's economy, media and society. The organization is active as an entrepreneur in various sectors and uses them as a source of finance and a hub for political influence.

GIS is significantly involved in the Egyptian media landscape. In the 2000s, GIS gradually took control of various private media companies in the country and brought them together under the umbrella of the holding company United Media Services (UMS). The UMS owns and operates popular satellite channels such as CBC and ON E as well as high-circulation print media such as the daily newspaper Al Youm Al Sabea (Youm7). The German think tank SWP wrote in 2022 that the GIS "has a significant influence on domestic reporting... For example, human rights organizations such as Human Rights Watch are vilified as the mouthpiece of terrorists."

With financial support from Saudi Arabia, a separate news channel was established, similar to the two large Arabic news channels al-Jazeera and al-Arabiya. It also serves to disseminate government positions outside of Egypt and to counteract international criticism, for example of the country's human rights situation. "Al-Qahera News" was launched in 2022.

== Operations ==
GIS operations which have (eventually) gone public have been much dramatized on Egyptian TV and cinema.

- The GIS caught British MI6 agents sent to Cairo to assassinate President Nasser in 1956.
- The GIS states that it managed to plant an Egyptian agent among Jewish immigrants to Israel. That agent, Refaat Al-Gammal, managed to live 18 years in Israel without being discovered. In those years, he established a network of spies in various fields of the Israeli community, though this is contradicted by various Israeli sources, which claim that Refaat was a double agent and helped the IDF to win the Six-Day War.
- In 1970, the GIS managed to hunt an Israeli oil rig while being shipped from Canada to Sinai (occupied at that time). Clandestine GIS agents and frogmen succeeded in tracing the oil rig to Abidjan, Côte d'Ivoire, and planted sets of explosives, had them detonated and crippled the rig. Ironically, this was done while the city was full, not only of Mossad agents protecting the oil rig, but also while it was full of CIA agents who were guarding the NASA astronauts during their visit to Côte d'Ivoire. This operation was published in 1985 under the name "Al-Haffar Operation" it was supervised at that time by GIS director Amin Howeidi (1921–2009).
- Perhaps a major success of the GIS was handling the Egyptian "Strategic Deception Plan", which was carried out from January 1970 to October 1973 and aimed to conceal the Egyptian plans to launch a massive operation to free occupied Sinai on 6 October 1973 starting the October war. The plan included planting false information and hidden implied data in Egyptian president Sadat's speeches and newspapers articles. For example, the GID prepared the military operations and evacuated complete sections of Cairo hospitals to be ready for receiving war casualties. This evacuation that took place a few days before the war started, was done after declaring false information that those hospitals were infected with Tetanus. The plan included a major operation whose details are still not published. This operation aimed at getting detailed information of American spy satellites covering the Middle East, by knowing the exact trajectories and timing of those satellites the GIS prepared complicated logistic movement schedules for all Egyptian military units to avoid moving mass troops in timings where they could be spotted by satellites.
- Gumaa Al-Shawan who used to provide the Mossad with false information from 1967 to 1973, he also used to get the advanced transmission devices from the Mossad and give it to the GIS.
- During the 1973 war with Israel, the GIS spied on Mossad weeks prior to the surprise attack on the 6 October 1973. The information derived allowed the director and his associates to identify the weakest points on the Israeli front line. A suicide mission to divert the Israeli counter-attack was initiated to halt Israeli movements into mainland Egypt.
- An Egyptian spy, Amin K., who worked as a staffer in the German government's press office had passed information to the GIS between 2010 and 2019.
- Under the lead of Elhamy Aly Elsebaey, GIS scored a major success in terms of strategic field between all armies around the world. In 2021, Elhamy Elsebaey leading the informatics of GIS, defended against the largest cyberattack with his optimum system, which he supervised personally with the support of some leads in IT from all over the world. Not to mention his lead to the information cybersecurity system in the Egyptian army. Elhamy Aly Elsebaey is a very well-known name in GIS, yet the public possesses limited information about him.
- On November 20, 2001, the Wall Street Journal published a detailed investigative story on earlier CIA-orchestrated renditions to torture in Egypt. The article described the 1998 arrests of several Egyptian terrorism suspects in Albania by local authorities. At the behest of the CIA, and the use of unmarked "CIA-chartered plane[s]" the suspects were sent to Egypt, where they were detained and interrogated under torture by GIS. Two of the men were hanged in 2000. The article's authors on WSJ were explicit about the incident's relevance, arguing that it "illuminates some of the tactical and moral questions that lie ahead in the global war on terrorism. Taking this fight to the enemy will mean teaming up with foreign security services that engage in political repression and pay little heed to human rights."

== Director of the General Intelligence ==
Director of the General Intelligence
- Incumbent; Hassan Mahmoud Rashad since 16 October 2024
- Appointer: Abdel Fattah el-Sisi; President of Egypt
- Inaugural holder: Zakaria Mohieddin
- Formation: 1954

The Director of the General Intelligence serves as the head of the Egyptian General Intelligence Service, which is part of the Egyptian intelligence community. The Director reports to the President. The Director is a civilian or a general or flag officer of the armed forces appointed by the President.

As of October 2024, the current director is Major General Hassan Mahmoud Rashad, while Nasser Fahmi and Sisi's son, Mahmoud el-Sisi, are deputy directors.

According to Mohamed Ali, the building contractor whose online videos criticizing president Abdel Fattah el-Sisi sparked off the September 2019 Egyptian protests, Kamel's "main qualification ... was his close relationship with Sisi". Sisi's son Mahmoud, officially one of the deputy directors, was seen by Ali as the de facto real head of the GIS.

=== List of directors ===
- Zakaria Mohieddin (1954–1956)
- Ali Sabri (1956–1957)
- Salah Nasr (1957–1967)
- Amin Howeidi (1967–1970)
- Mohammed Hafez Ismail (1970)
- Ahmad Kamel (1970)
- Karim Abdelrahman El-Leithy (1970–1973)
- Ahmad Ismail Ali (1973–1974)
- Ahmad Abdulsalam Tawfiq (1974–1975)
- Kamal Hassan Ali (1975–1978)
- Mohamed Saeed El Mahy (1978–1981)
- Mohamed Fuaad Nassar (1981–1983)
- Mohamed Refat Jibreel (1983–1986)
- Kamal Hassan Ali (1986–1989)
- Omar Negm (1989–1991)
- Nour Eddien Afifi (1991–1993)
- Omar Suleiman (1993–2011)
- Murad Muwafi (2011–2012)
- Mohamed Raafat Shehata (2012–2013)
- Mohamed Fareed (2013–2014)
- Khaled Fawzy (2014–2018)
- Abbas Kamel (2018–2024)
- Hassan Rashad (2024–present)

== See also ==
- Mukhabarat
