= Mohammed Hafez Ismail =

Egyptian diplomat

Hafez Ismail

National Security Advisor
- In office September 1971 – 1973
- President: Anwar Sadat
- Preceded by: Office established
- Succeeded by: None

Director of General Intelligence Directorate
- In office May 1970 – November 1970
- President: Gamal Abdel Nasser
- Preceded by: Amin Howeidi
- Succeeded by: Ahmed Kamel

Deputy Minister of Foreign Affairs (Egypt)
- In office September 1960 – June 1964
- President: Gamal Abdel Nasser

Personal details
- Born: 28 October 1919
- Died: 1 January 1997 (aged 77) Cairo, Egypt
- Resting place: Cairo, Egypt
- Spouse: Safa Nour
- Education: War College, Cairo, Royal Military Academy, Woolwich, Military Staff Academy, Cairo, Staff College, Camberley

Military service
- Allegiance: Egypt
- Branch/service: Egyptian Army
- Years of service: 1939–1960
- Rank: Lieutenant General
- Commands: Director of the Bureau of the Commander in Chief
- Battles/wars: Second World War; 1948 Arab–Israeli War
- Awards: Legion of Merit

Mohammed Hafez Ismail, sometimes spelt Muhammad Hafiz Ismail Arabic: محمد حافظ إسماعيل known as Hafez Ismail, (October 28, 1919 – January 1, 1997) was an Egyptian "statesman beyond rank", whose four decade career included military, foreign service and intelligence roles, making his "life read like a foreign policy history of contemporary Egypt".

== Biography ==
After graduating from military schools in Egypt and Britain in 1939, Ismail led an Egyptian unit in the Second World War close to Egypt's border with Italian occupied Libya, and was stationed in Arish and Rafah in the Arab-Israeli War in 1948–49.

Ismail would then take on staff roles, starting as deputy Military attaché to Washington in 1951. After the July 1952 Revolution which established the republic and independence from Britain, he was appointed as Director of the Bureau of the Commander in Chief, Abdel Hakim Amer, where between 1953 and 1960 he was entrusted with rebuilding a post-colonial military, leading secret delegations to the Soviet Union, the more famous of which was the 1955 Egyptian-Czechoslovak arms deal. Ismail also liaised with Syrian military leaders during the Tripartite Aggression against Egypt in 1956, and facilitated the merger of Syrian and Egyptian troops in the lead up to the formation between them of the United Arab Republic in 1958.

In 1960, Hafez Ismail retired from the military and was made deputy at the Ministry of Foreign Affairs and given the task of modernizing it, before being posted as ambassador to London, Paris, Dublin and Rome between 1963 and 1970.

His career took another shift in 1970, this time to intelligence when President Gamal Abdel Nasser appointed him director of the General Intelligence Directorate in the wake of the 1967 defeat from Israel in the Six Day War. A year later he became National Security Adviser (1971-1974) for Nasser's successor Anwar Sadat, and Presidential Chief of Staff (1973), conducting secret talks with the US in the lead up to the October War that saw Egypt attempt to retake the Sinai. After falling out with Sadat who was ignoring his counsel, Ismail rejoined the foreign service where he was posted to Moscow and later Paris before reaching retirement in 1979.

Hafez Ismail spent his later years writing and lecturing, while holding an honorary post as director of the General Intelligence think tank, the Republican Center for Strategic and Security Studies.

== Writings ==
Amn Misr al-Qawmi fi ‘asr al-Tahadiyyat [Egyptian National Security in an Era of Challenges] (in Arabic). Cairo: Dar al-Ahram li-L-Tarjama, 1987.

‘an al-Diplomasiya wal-Harb [On Diplomacy and War]. al-Ahaly, February 16, 1994.

Siyasat Misr al-Kharijiya fi ‘aqd al-Thamaninat (Egypt's Foreign Policy in the 1980s]. al-ahram, October 21, 1991.

Dirasa Jadida: Maza Yajri fi-l-Itihad al-Sovieti? [New Study: What is Happening in the Soviet Union?]. Al-Gomhuriya, August 14, 1988.
