= Kamal Amer =

Egyptian politician (1942–2021)

Governor of Aswan Governorate
- In office 31 October 1999 – 17 July 2001
- Preceded by: Samir Youssef
- Succeeded by: Salah Misbah

Governor of Matrouh Governorate
- In office 9 July 1997 – 21 November 1999
- Preceded by: Samir Youssef
- Succeeded by: Abdel Moneim Saeed

Personal details
- Born: 13 June 1942 Cairo, Egypt
- Died: 4 March 2021 (aged 78) Cairo, Egypt
- Party: Independent

Kamal Amer (Arabic: كمال عامر; 13 June 1942 – 4 March 2021) was an Egyptian politician and military commander.

== Biography ==
Amer was trained at the Egyptian Military Academy and Nasser Military Academy. During his military career, Amer ascended to the role of Commander of the Third Army. President Hosni Mubarak appointed him Director of Military Intelligence, a position he held until 1997. From 9 July 1997 to 21 November 1999, he was Governor of the Matrouh Governorate. He then served as Governor of the Aswan Governorate from 31 October 1999 until 17 July 2001. From December 2012 to June 2013, he served in the Shura Council.

Kamal Amer died of COVID-19 in Cairo on 4 March 2021.
