= Hassan Rashad =

Director of Egyptian General Intelligence Directorate

Director of the General Intelligence Service
- Incumbent
- Assumed office 16 October 2024
- President: Abdel Fattah el-Sisi
- Preceded by: Abbas Kamel

Personal details
- Born: Hassan Mahmoud Rashad; 1967 (age 58–59) Cairo, Egypt
- Spouse: Marwa Taalab
- Relations: Yusuf Sibai (grandfather)

Military service
- Allegiance: Egypt
- Branch/service: Egyptian Armed Forces
- Years of service: 1990s–present
- Rank: Major general

Hassan Rashad (Arabic: حسن رشاد; born 1967) is an Egyptian military officer who has served as director of the General Intelligence Service (GIS), Egypt's main intelligence apparatus, since October 2024.

== Early life and education ==
Rashad was born in Cairo in 1967. His father is a major general from Damietta, and grandfather was Yusuf Sibai, a writer and politician who was assassinated in 1978. Rashad attended the Military Technical College, graduating in 1990 with the rank of first lieutenant and bachelor's degrees in engineering and military science.

== Career ==
Rashad joined the General Intelligence Service (GIS) in the early 1990s. He was eventually promoted to deputy of then-director Abbas Kamel, who took office in 2018. During his career, he handled the Iran file for seven years, during a time where Iranian influence in the region was escalating. He also oversaw cyber insurance for government and finance institutions.

=== Director of the General Intelligence Service ===
On 16 October 2024, Rashad was appointed director of the GIS, taking the oath of office in front of president Abdel Fattah el-Sisi. He became in charge of several notable files, namely Gaza, Libya, Ethiopia, and Sudan.

==== Gaza ====
In the Gaza file, he has maintained indirect contact between Israel and Palestinian factions to facilitate negotiations over ceasefires, prisoner exchanges, and the delivery of humanitarian aid. On 21 October 2025, he met Israeli prime minister Benjamin Netanyahu at the Prime Minister's Office in Jerusalem, where they discussed humanitarian aid and the implementation of the US president Donald Trump-brokered Gaza peace plan. He became the first senior Egyptian official to travel to Israel since the Gaza war broke out in 2023. In January 2026, he was named a member of the Gaza Executive Board, which was established by the Board of Peace to support a technocratic committee assigned to govern post-war Gaza. On 30 June, he met with Turkish National Intelligence Organization chief İbrahim Kalın in Ankara, where they discussed the implementation of the ceasefire's second phase amid violations by Israel. They later held a joint meeting with senior Hamas leaders, including Khaled Mashal, Khalil al-Hayya, and Mohammad Hassan. On 16 August, he received al-Hayya in El Alamein to discuss the implementation of the peace plan.

==== Elsewhere ====
On 8 April 2025, he traveled to Port Sudan and met with Sudanese Armed Forces chief Abdel Fattah al-Burhan, where they focused on expanding bilateral relations and cooperation. In October, he met with Lebanese president Joseph Aoun in Beirut, where he expressed his country's willingness to help stabilize southern Lebanon, which has been the target of Israeli airstrikes due to the Hezbollah–Israel conflict. They also discussed Lebanon's participation in the Gaza peace summit and the ceasefire in Gaza. It was later reported that he delivered an initiative which would see a three-month ceasefire where Israel would halt its strikes and release detainees in exchange for Hezbollah's withdrawal from southern Lebanon. The deal would have also seen a gradual Israeli withdrawal from southern Lebanon as a solution to Hezbollah’s weapons north of the Litani River was implemented.

On 24 January 2026, Rashad again met al-Burhan in Port Sudan. The following month, he led a delegation to Benghazi, where they met Libyan National Army commander Khalifa Haftar, a move seen as an attempt to strengthen relations with eastern Libya. In June, he traveled to Tripoli, where he met Libyan prime minister Abdul Hamid Dbeibeh. During the meeting, he delivered greetings from el-Sisi and reiterated Egypt's commitment to expanding cooperation between the two countries. On 13 August, he met Turkish foreign minister Hakan Fidan in El Alamein.

== Personal life ==
Rashad is married to Marwa Taalab, the daughter of former deputy interior minister Mohamed Taalab. He is fluent in Arabic and English.
