= Omar Suleiman (politician) =

Vice President of Egypt from January 2011 to February 2011

- عمر محمود سليمان
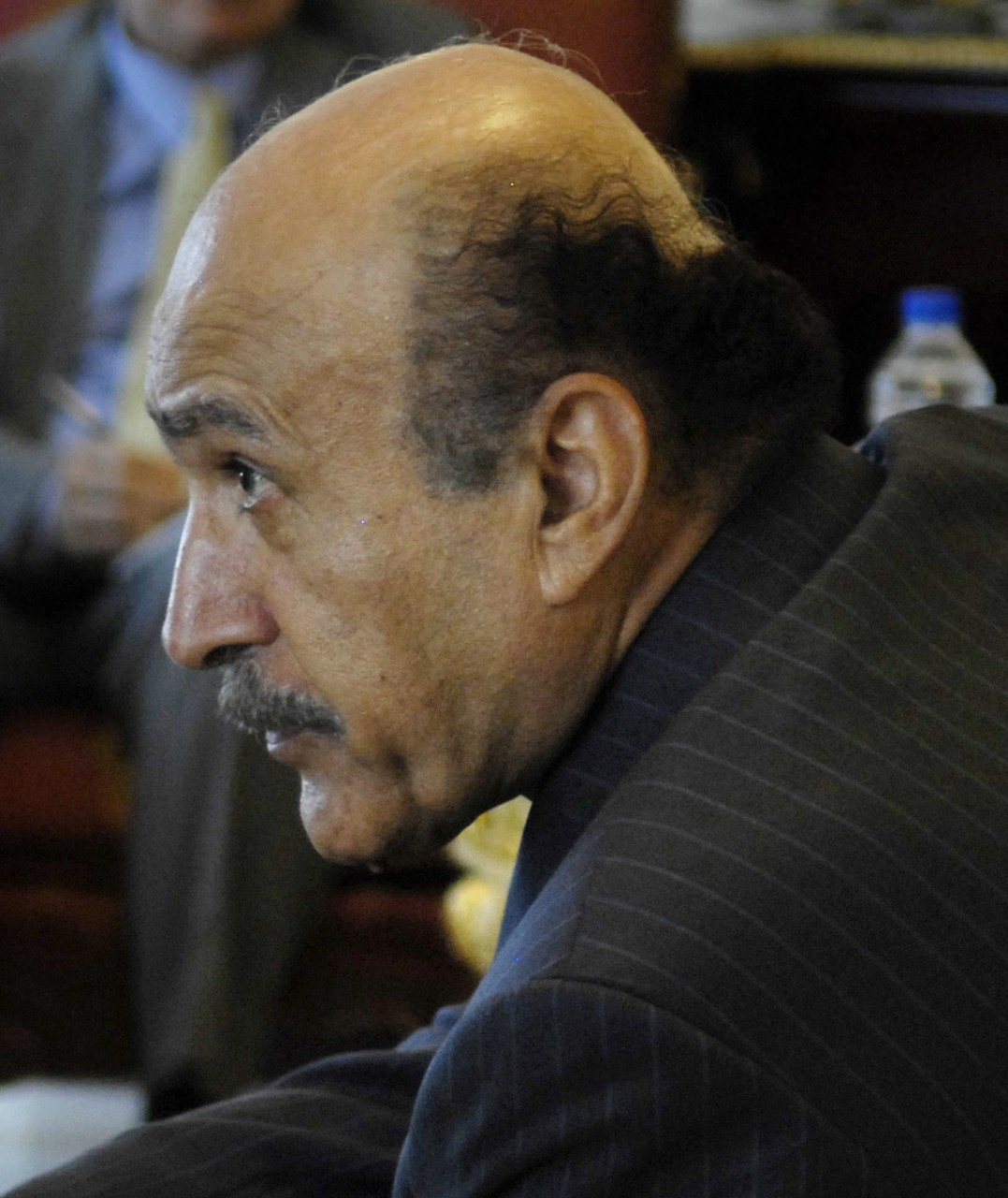
- Suleiman in 2007

8th Vice President of Egypt
- In office 29 January 2011 – 11 February 2011
- President: Hosni Mubarak
- Preceded by: Hosni Mubarak (1981) (Note: Office vacant from 14 October 1981 to 29 January 2011.)
- Succeeded by: Mahmoud Mekki

Director of the General Intelligence Directorate
- In office 22 January 1991 – 31 January 2011
- President: Hosni Mubarak
- Preceded by: Nour El Deen Afeefy
- Succeeded by: Murad Muwafi

Personal details
- Born: Omar Mahmoud Suleiman; 2 July 1936 Qena, Kingdom of Egypt
- Died: 19 July 2012 (aged 76) Cleveland, Ohio, U.S.
- Party: National Democratic Party
- Education: Egyptian Military Academy; M. V. Frunze Military Academy; Ain Shams University; Cairo University

Military service
- Allegiance: Egypt
- Branch/service: Army
- Years of service: 1956–1991
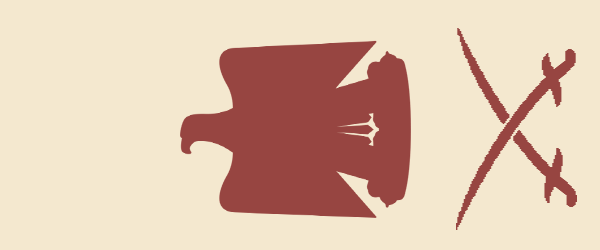
- Rank: Major General
- Battles/wars: North Yemen Civil War; Six-Day War; War of Attrition; October War

Omar Mahmoud Suleiman (Arabic: عمر محمود سليمان, [ˈʕomɑɾ seleˈmæːn]; 2 July 1936 – 19 July 2012) was an Egyptian army general, politician, diplomat, and intelligence officer. A leading figure in Egypt's intelligence system beginning in 1986, Suleiman was appointed to the long-vacant vice presidency by President Hosni Mubarak on 29 January 2011. On 11 February 2011, Suleiman announced Mubarak's resignation and ceased being vice president; governing power was transferred to the Armed Forces Supreme Council, of which Suleiman was not a member in 2011. A new head of intelligence services was appointed by the ruling Supreme Council. Suleiman withdrew from the political scene and did not appear in public after announcing Mubarak's resignation.

Millions of Egyptian citizens involved in the Egyptian Revolution of 2011 opposed Suleiman or Mubarak remaining in power without elections taking place. Human rights groups tied Suleiman's career to a regime marked by widespread human rights abuses, and asserted that many Egyptian revolutionaries "see Suleiman as Mubarak II. However many Egyptians also saw Suleiman as a pillar of the old order who might have served as a buffer between military rule on the one hand and dominance by Islamist groups on the other." Tortured victims and human rights groups charged that Suleiman oversaw the systematic use of torture on detainees and that in at least one instance he was accused of personally torturing a detainee. In response to the 2011 protests, Suleiman blamed foreign influence and appealed to protestors to go home.

Suleiman died at on 19 July 2012 at the Cleveland Clinic at the age of 76 of complications related to amyloidosis.

== Early life and education ==
Suleiman was born on 2 July 1936 in Qena in Upper Egypt. He lived in Cairo during his childhood, and enrolled in Egypt's prestigious Military Academy there. He received additional military training in the Soviet Union at Moscow's Frunze Military Academy. He participated in both the Six-Day and October wars. In the mid-1980s, Suleiman earned additional degrees, including a bachelor's degree from Ain Shams University and a master's degree from Cairo University, both in political science. A fluent English speaker, Suleiman was transferred to military intelligence, where he worked on Egypt–United States relations.

Suleiman became deputy head of military intelligence in 1986, and its director in 1988. In 1993, he became the chief of the Egyptian General Intelligence Service (EGIS). In 1995, he insisted that President Mubarak ride in an armored car during a visit to Ethiopia. A would-be assassin fired on the vehicle, but Mubarak escaped without injury due to the added precautions. His name only became known in later years, breaking the tradition of keeping the name of the Egyptian head of Intelligence a secret known only to senior government officials. It was released in the media around 2000.

In his role as Director of EGIS, British newspaper The Daily Telegraph called him "one of the world's most powerful spy chiefs". In 2009, Foreign Policy magazine ranked him as the Middle East's most powerful intelligence chief, ahead of Mossad chief at the time Meir Dagan.

According to diplomatic cables leaked to WikiLeaks, Suleiman pledged in 2007 to Yuval Diskin of the Israeli Security Agency (ISA) to "cleanse" Sinai of Palestinian arms smugglers.

=== Commentary on disrupting Palestinian elections ===
Suleiman promised Israel in 2005 that he would prevent Hamas from gaining control over Gaza in the 2006 Palestinian elections, according to a US diplomatic cable. Amos Gilad, head of the Israeli Defense Ministry's Diplomatic-Security Bureau, and Suleiman discussed their common fear of Hamas winning the Palestinian elections set for January 2006. Suleiman asserted to Gilad that there "will be no elections in January. We will take care of it." Suleiman did not elaborate as to how Egypt would stop the Palestinian elections from taking place. Suleiman was separately quoted as saying Gaza could "go hungry, but not starve."

The U.S. Embassy in Tel Aviv wrote that Suleiman feared Hamas rule in Gaza would bolster the Muslim Brotherhood in Egypt. Gilad requested that the U.S. closely hold this information and said he did not know how the Egyptians could prevent the elections from taking place but that the "only people the Palestinians can trust now are the Egyptians."

=== CIA "rendition" program ===
Suleiman was directly implicated in the controversial CIA "rendition" program. Journalist Stephen Grey in his work, Ghost Plane, states that after taking over as intelligence director, Suleiman oversaw an agreement with the US in 1995 that allowed for suspected militants to be secretly transferred to Egypt for questioning. Although Suleiman's Egyptian Intelligence was required to provide "assurances" that prisoners handed over through this program would not be subjected to torture, at least one CIA officer testified that such assurances from them were unofficially regarded as being as worthless as "a bucket of warm spit".

Suleiman was accused of complicity in the torture of Al-Qaeda suspects in Egypt, particularly the case of Ibn al-Shaykh al-Libi, who was captured and handed over to Suleiman. The information al-Libi gave under torture was cited by US officials in the run-up to the 2003 invasion of Iraq as evidence of a connection between Saddam Hussein and al-Qaeda. Al-Libi later retracted his confession.

== Political career ==
Suleiman was seen as a very close and trusted ally of former president Hosni Mubarak, sharing many of his views on key issues such as Iran, Egypt–Israel relations and the United States, and treatment of the Muslim Brotherhood. Although he was a military man who by law is not a member of Mubarak's National Democratic Party, he preferred suits to military uniform and was seen as a major link between Egyptian political and military elites. Due to his role in the regional political scene and the lack of an alternative candidate acceptable to Hosni Mubarak, some speculated that Suleiman would succeed Mubarak as president. In particular, he was seen as the choice of the Egyptian military establishment. Suleiman denied any intent to run for election to the office. On 29 January 2011, he was named Vice President of Egypt during the civil unrest, ending a vacancy in the position that lasted almost 30 years. He was sworn in two days later.

On 5 February 2011, a senior Egyptian security source denied reports of an assassination attempt on Omar Suleiman, saying there was no truth to them at all. Fox News reported that an unnamed official in the Obama Administration asserted there was an assassination attempt on Suleiman "soon after Suleiman was appointed", and claimed that it took the form of an attack on Suleiman's motorcade. Wolfgang Ischinger, host of the Munich Security Conference and originator of the incorrect allegations, later said he "was led to believe that we had a confirmed report but in fact we didn't" and also added that the information had come from an "unsubstantiated source." Later on 24 February 2011, Foreign Minister Ahmed Aboul Gheit confirmed that Suleiman had survived an assassination attempt on 4 February, when a group of unidentified men opened fire on Suleiman's car from a stolen ambulance in Cairo.

According to an interview with the Egyptian ambassador to the United States on 10 February 2011, Omar Suleiman became the de facto President of Egypt after President Mubarak transferred his power to Suleiman. The following day Suleiman announced Mubarak's resignation and governing power was transferred to the Supreme Council of the Armed Forces. According to the Egypt State Information Service, Suleiman subsequently ceased holding the office of Vice President.

On 6 April 2012 Suleiman announced that he would be running for president, after some demonstration. Suleiman accused the Muslim Brotherhood of planning the assassination attempt on 5 February. Moreover, he accused them of some threats of "SLAIN if he run for the president" that he had received before running for it. Furthermore, the Brotherhood and some Islamists arranged a huge protest against Suleiman whose popularity had grown dramatically.

== Public image and perception ==
Al Jazeera described Omar Suleiman as the unelected Vice President of Egypt, éminence grise to President Hosni Mubarak, and point man for Egypt's secret relations with Israel. Jane Mayer of The New Yorker noted that Suleiman remained controversial because he "has headed the feared Egyptian general intelligence service" and also described his role in allowing controversial torture methods under US rendition programs which may have generated bad intelligence.

In turn, Suleiman blamed journalists for the current uprising in Egypt. "I actually blame certain friendly nations who have television channels, they're not friendly at all, who have intensified the youth against the nation and the state," Suleiman said in a TV address. "They have filled in the minds of the youth with wrongdoings, with allegations and this is unacceptable. They should have never done that. They should have never sent this enemy spirit," he said. The Committee to Protect Journalists replied that "it is stupefying that the government continues to send out thugs and plainclothes police to attack journalists and to ransack media bureaus". State Department spokesman Philip J. Crowley said "we have traced it to elements close to the government, or the ruling party," and said "I don't know that we have a sense how far up the chain it went."

=== Domestic ===
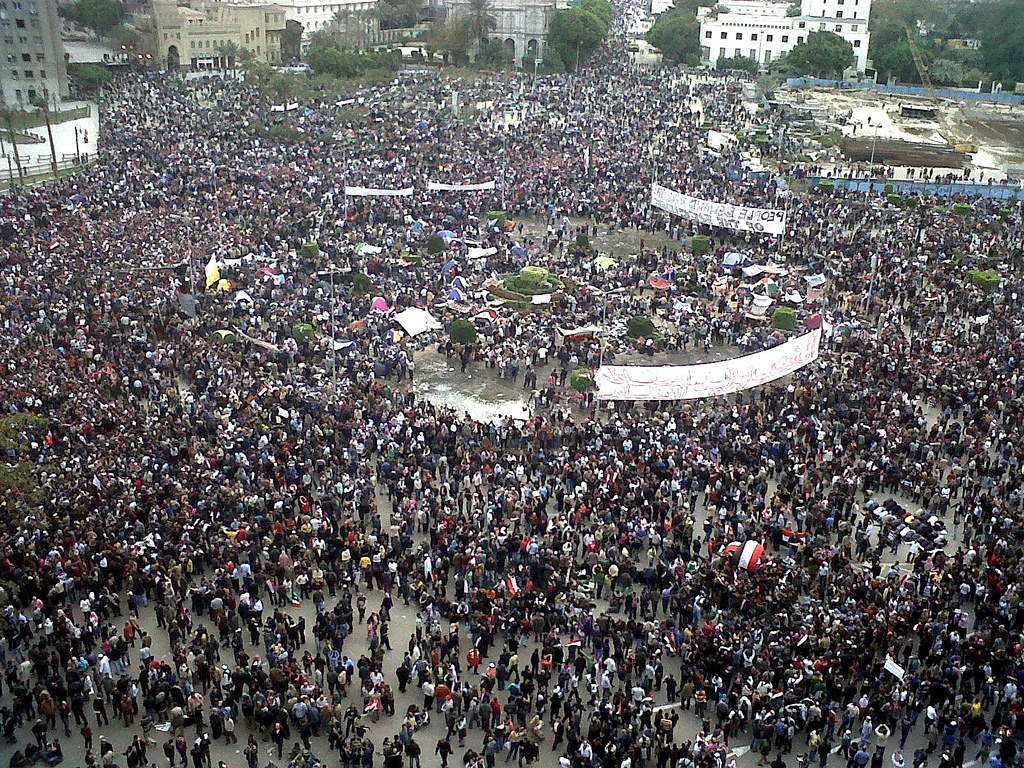
Millions of Egyptians called for the dissolution of the Mubarak regime and new elections

Bloomberg reported that Suleiman "lacks the support where he now needs it most: the streets of Cairo". "The Egyptians don't want Mubarak and they don't want Suleiman," said Chayma Hassabo, a researcher on Arab political movements at Cedej, a Cairo-based research center. Al Jazeera wrote Suleiman "does not have a high opinion of Islam in politics, and is not shy about telling Western audiences the lengths he will go to allow his security services to keep the Muslim Brotherhood and their offshoots at bay."

The young guard in Egypt is opposed to Suleiman running the country without elections taking place. Students, union activists and opposition bloggers within Egypt all remain opposed to Suleiman. Veteran Egyptian journalist Nadia abou el-Magd said it comes down to the protesters. "They that made revolution and they are in the position to impose their conditions," said el-Magd, who works for the newspaper Al Ahram and The Associated Press. "They don't see that ... anybody else is in a position to impose their conditions on them."

In response to the appointment of Omar Suleiman as the new Vice President of Egypt, Mohammed ElBaradei stated that it was a "hopeless, desperate attempt by Mubarak to stay in power, I think it is loud and clear ... that Mubarak has to leave today".

=== United States ===
Leaked diplomatic cables suggested Suleiman enjoyed a strong relationship with the Central Intelligence Agency (CIA). "Our intelligence collaboration with Omar Suleiman is now probably the most successful element of the relationship" with Egypt, said a 2006 U.S. diplomatic cable that used an alternative transliteration of his name, which also described Suleiman as Mubarak's consigliere on foreign policy.

In an op-ed for Al Jazeera, Lisa Hajjar opined that Egyptian-born Australian citizen Mamdouh Habib, "who was innocent of any ties to terror or militancy", was seized from a bus by Pakistani security forces and suspended from a hook and electrocuted repeatedly at American behest. "His fingers were broken and he was hung from metal hooks. At one point, his interrogator slapped him so hard that his blindfold was dislodged, revealing the identity of his tormentor: Suleiman," Haijar asserts. According to Hajjar, Suleiman ordered a guard to murder a shackled prisoner in front of Habib, which he did with a vicious karate kick. After an article of the ordeal appeared in the Washington Post, the American government announced they would not charge Habib and that they would release him to Australia. Habib said he would sue the Egyptian government for his treatment. Tom Malinowski of Human Rights Watch asserts "the Americans knew what was going to happen to people who were rendered to Egypt".

On 12 April, Suleiman announced his intentions to run in the Presidential elections, because he feared Islamist forces would turn Egypt into a religious state and isolate Egypt from the international community.

=== Middle East ===
Luis Moreno, a U.S. intelligence analyst, wrote that although he deferred to the Embassy in Cairo for Egyptian succession scenario analysis, "there is no question that Israel is most comfortable with the prospect of" Suleiman. David Hacham stated an Israeli delegation led by Defense Minister Ehud Barak was "shocked by Mubarak's aged appearance and slurred speech," when it met him in Egypt. "Hacham was full of praise for Soliman, however." Hacham added that he sometimes spoke to Suleiman's deputy several times a day via a "hotline." Maha Azzam, a fellow at Chatham House, a London-based international affairs research institute, said "the Israelis are happy with Omar Suleiman, he has been pivotal in the peace process, he's someone they know and someone they can deal with." Avigdor Lieberman, the Deputy Prime Minister of Israel, expressed "his respect and appreciation for Egypt's leading role in the region and his personal respect for Egyptian President Hosni Mubarak and Minister Suleiman".

Saudi Arabia, Jordan and the United Arab Emirates each repeatedly pressed the United States not to cut loose the Mubarak regime; for example, Crown Prince Mohammed bin Zayed of Abu Dhabi, whom some believe to be the real strongman of the UAE, emphasized the need for "stability" in Egypt. The New York Times reported these countries "worry that a sudden, chaotic change in Egypt would destabilize the region or, in the Arab nations, even jeopardize their own leaders, many of whom are also autocrats facing restive populations."

=== Non-governmental organizations ===
According to Amnesty International and Human Rights Watch, Suleiman's career moved in lockstep with a regime marked by widespread abuses. “Torture is an endemic problem in Egypt and ending police abuse has been a driving element behind the massive popular demonstrations that swept Egypt over the past week,” Human Rights Watch said in a January report.

Human Rights Watch further wrote that "Egyptians, particularly those of us calling for an end to Mubarak's three-decade rule, see Suleiman as Mubarak II, especially after the lengthy interview he gave to Egyptian state television on 3 February 2011 in which he accused the demonstrators in Tahrir Square of implementing foreign agendas. He did not even bother to veil his threats of retaliation against protesters." The Committee to Protect Journalists and Freedom House also criticized the Mubarak regime for its violence against protesters and suppression of journalists.

== Death ==
On 19 July 2012, Suleiman died in a hospital in Cleveland, Ohio, while undergoing medical testing for an unknown problem. The official Egyptian state-run Middle East News Agency reported that Suleiman had been suffering from heart and lung problems for several months and that he had died of a heart attack. Hussein Kamal, one of his assistants, said it was an unexpected event. "He was fine. It came suddenly while he was having medical tests in Cleveland." Preparations began to send his body to Egypt for burial. Suleiman was given a military funeral, with Field Marshal Mohamed Hussein Tantawi, the former head of the Supreme Council of the Armed Forces, attending.

== Medals and decorations ==
- Grand Cordon of the Order of the Republic (Egypt)
- Grand Cross of the Order of Merit (Egypt)
- Medal of Military Courage (Egypt)
- Distinguished Service Medal (Egypt)
- Medal of Longevity and Exemplary Service (Egypt)
- Sinai Libration Medal (Egypt)
- Silver Jubilee of October War 1973 Medal (Egypt)

Political offices
| Vacant Title last held by Hosni Mubarak | Vice-President of Egypt; 2011 | Vacant Title next held by Mahmoud Mekki |
