= Salah Nasr =

Director of Egyptian Intelligence (1920–1982)

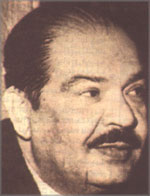
- Native name: صلاح نصر
- Born: 8 July 1920; Beni Suef, Egypt
- Died: 5 March 1982 (aged 61) Egypt
- Allegiance: Egypt
- Branch: Egyptian General Intelligence Directorate
- Service years: 1940–1967
- Rank: لواء (Major General)
- Commands: Director of Egyptian General Intelligence

Salah Nasr (Arabic: صلاح الدين محمد نصر, IPA: [sˤɑˈlɑːħ edˈdiːn mæˈħammæd ˈnɑsˤɾ]) (8 October 1920 – 5 March 1982) served as head of the Egyptian General Intelligence Directorate from 1957 to 1967. He retired citing health reasons following Egypt's defeat in the 1967 Six-Day War. He was succeeded by Amin Howeidi in the post.

Nasr was arrested and tried soon after the end of his tenure as the head of general intelligence. He was freed when he was granted release by Anwar Sadat in February 1974.

In 1976, Nasr was again imprisoned after being accused by journalist Mustafa Amin of torture after an arrest 11 years prior.
