= Amin Howeidi =

Egyptian military leader, author and defense minister (1921–2009)

Director of the Egyptian General Intelligence Directorate
- In office August 1967 – April 1970
- President: Gamal Abdel Nasser
- Preceded by: Salah Nasr
- Succeeded by: Mohammed Hafez Ismail

Minister of War
- In office 22 July 1967 – 24 February 1968
- President: Gamal Abdel Nasser
- Preceded by: Shams Badran
- Succeeded by: Mohammed Fawzi

Personal details
- Born: Amin Hamid Howeidi; 22 September 1921 Munufiya, Sultanate of Egypt
- Died: 31 October 2009 (aged 88)
- Education: Egyptian Military Academy; United States Army Command and General Staff College; Cairo University

Amin Hamid Howeidi (Arabic: أمين حامد هويدي; 22 September 1921 – 31 October 2009) was an Egyptian military leader, author and minister of war under Nasser's rule.

== Early life and education ==
Howeidi was born in Munufiya on 22 September 1921. He attended the Egyptian Military Academy and graduated in 1940. He held a master's degree in military sciences from the Chief of Staff College which he received in 1951. Then he attended the United States Army Command and General Staff College (CGSC) at Fort Leavenworth and obtained another master's degree in military sciences in 1955. Next, he obtained a master's degree in translation, press and publication from Cairo University in 1956.

== Career ==
After his graduation Howeidi began to work as a teacher at the Military Academy. Later, he became a professor at the Military Chief of Staff College. In addition, he served as the head of military operations planning in the Armed Forces Command. He was part of the Free Officers who inaugurated the 1952 revolution in Egypt. Then he began to hold public posts in 1956 when he was appointed minister of guidance. His other offices included ambassador to Morocco (1962–1963), ambassador to Iraq (1963–1965), minister of national guidance (1965–1966), and minister of state for cabinet affairs (1966–1967).

Howeidi was appointed minister of war and director of general intelligence by Gamal Abdel Nasser after the defeat of Egypt in the Six-Day War. His term as minister of war began on 22 July 1967, succeeding Shams Badran in the post. Howeidi's term ended on 24 February 1968, and he was succeeded by Mohammed Fawzi as defense minister. Howeidi served as director of general intelligence from 1967 to 1970.

=== Arrest ===
In 1971, Howeidi was detained along with 91 others accused of treason, and then tried at the Revolutionary Tribunal. He was sentenced to house arrest for nearly 10 months.

== Personal life and death ==
Howeidi was married and had two children, a daughter and a son. He died on 31 October 2009 at the age of 88.

== Publications and views ==
Howeidi was the author of various books, including How Zionist Leaders Think, The lost opportunities for Arab unity, 50 Years of Storms: Telling What I saw and The 1967 War: The Secrets and Mysteries. In addition, he wrote op-eds for Al Ahram Weekly. His commentaries were also published in the Al Ahali newspaper.

Howeidi was optimistic about Arab-Israeli conflict and believed that the Clinton administration was sincere in its efforts to solve the conflict.
