= Mohamed Fareed =

Egyptian Intelligence director (1947–2024)

- محمد فريد التهامي

Director of the General Intelligence Directorate
- In office 4 July 2013 – 21 December 2014
- President: Adly Mansour (Acting); Abdel Fattah el-Sisi
- Preceded by: Mohamed Raafat Shehata
- Succeeded by: Khaled Fawzy

Personal details
- Born: 1947 Egypt
- Died: 22 July 2024 (aged 76–77)

Military service
- Allegiance: Egypt
- Branch/service: Egyptian Army
- Years of service: 1967–2006
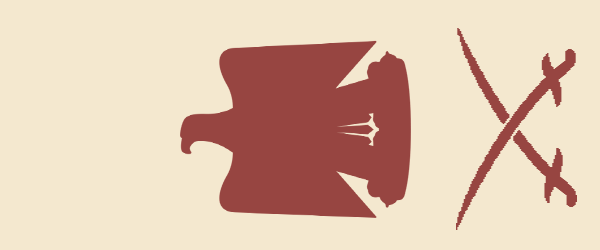
- Rank: Major General
- Battles/wars: Yom Kippur War

Major General Mohamed Ahmed Fareed Al-Tuhami (Arabic: محمد فريد التهامي; 1947 – 22 July 2024) was a former director of the Egyptian General Intelligence Directorate (EGID). Fareed graduated from the Egyptian Military Academy in Cairo in 1967. He attended various training courses including the General Command and Staff Course. During his military career he served in leadership positions in the infantry and mechanical infantry, then became commander of a tactical formation, and was appointed General Director of the military intelligence and reconnaissance department (DIM) of Ministry of Defence (MoD). He has been described as a mentor to General Abdel Fattah el-Sisi, the current President of Egypt.

In 2004, President Mubarak appointed him as the Head of the Administrative Control Authority (ACA), a governmental agency set up in 1964 which specialized in combating corruption. In September 2012, President Mohamed Morsi fired him, following reports that he was hiding evidence against former President Hosni Mubarak.

After the 2013 Egyptian coup d'état, acting president Adly Mansour announced on July 4, 2013, that Fareed would be appointed the new Director of the General Intelligence, reportedly "one of the most powerful positions in Egypt", replacing Mohamed Raafat Shehata.

Critic Hossam Bahgat has complained that the claimed corruption charges against Fareed disappeared following the coup. According to journalist David D. Kirkpatrick, critics describe him as an influential opponent of any reconciliation with the Muslim Brotherhood or Islamists, and claim that his return as signaling a "restoration" of the old pre-revolutionary order in Egypt.

Fareed died on 22 July 2024.
