= 2020 in Egypt =

- Decades: 2000s; 2010s; 2020s
- See also: Other events of 2020; List of years in Egypt

Events in the year 2020 in Egypt.

== Incumbents ==
- President of Egypt: Abdel Fattah el-Sisi
- Prime Minister of Egypt: Moustafa Madbouly

== Events ==
Ongoing – 2020 Middle East storms; COVID-19 pandemic in Egypt

=== January ===
- 7 – 11 January – The African Qualification Tournament for the 2020 Men's Olympic Volleyball Tournament was held in Cairo. The tournament was won by Tunisia who qualified for the 2020 Summer Olympics.
- 16 – 26 January – The African Men's Handball Championship was held in Tunisia. Egypt won their seventh title after defeating Tunisia 27 to 23 in the final.
- 27 January – Egypt's High Administrative Court approved on Monday Cairo University's decision to ban its professors from wearing the niqab or face veil.
- 28 January – 7 February – The 2020 Africa Futsal Cup of Nations was hosted in Morocco after being postponed due to the COVID-19 pandemic. Morocco successfully defended their title after beating Egypt 5–0 in the final.
- 31 January – A 12-year-old girl died after a genital mutilation surgery.

=== February ===
- 1 February – The Grand Mufti began to rule on the legality of 37 death sentences for terrorism.
- 3 February – Daesh claimed responsibility for a gas pipeline explosion in the Sinai Peninsula.
- 10 – 13 February – The 2020 All Africa Men's and Women's Team Badminton Championships was held in Cairo.
- 10 – 16 February – The 2020 Zed Tennis Open, the first edition of the tournament to be part of the 2020 ITF Women's World Tennis Tour, took place in Cairo.
- 11 February – The Egyptian population reached 100 million.
- 14 February – The Egyptian Health Ministry confirmed the first case of COVID-19 in the country.
- 14 – 16 February – The 2020 African Badminton Championships was held at the Cairo Stadium Hall 2 in Cairo.
- 16 February – Egypt's chief prosecutor denied that 28-year-old Egyptian student and human rights activist Patrick George Zaki was tortured for criticizing President Fattah el-Sissi.
- 17 – 23 February – The 2020 Zed Tennis Open II took place in Cairo.
- 29 February – The country announced that it will use "all means" to defend its interests in a dispute with Ethiopia and Sudan over a dam on the Nile River.

=== March ===
- 8 March – A 60-year-old German citizen in Hurghada died, the first German fatality from the virus.
- 13 March
  - After a second Tunisian coming back from Egypt tested positive for the virus, Tunisia officially added the country to a list of outbreak areas. As a result, Tunisia closed its borders with Egypt and imposed a quarantine to anyone coming from the country.
  - Twenty people were killed after the strongest storm in the region in 35 to 40 years hits Egypt. The storm, nicknamed "the dragon," also lead to the closure of Luxor International Airport.
- 18 March – Police detained four activists after they protested in front of the cabinet headquarters calling for the release of political prisoners to protect them from the spread of COVID-19.
- 19 March – The minister of aviation closed airports and suspended all air travel until 31 March due to COVID-19.
- 30 March – Museums and archaeological sites, including the Pyramids and the Sphinx at Giza, were closed until at least April 15 in an effort to combat the spread of COVID-19. Despite this, authorities still planned to light up the pyramids on 30 March to honor Egyptian health workers.

=== April ===
- 4 April – The number of cases of COVID-19 in the country surpassed 1000.
- 23 April
  - The nighttime curfew was shortened by one hour for Ramadan, with the new curfew running from 9 pm to 6 am.
  - An agreement between the Spanish firm Naturgy Energy Group S.A., Italian firm Eni S.p.A., and the Egyptian government failed to resolve disputes over a gas plant in Damietta.

=== May ===
- 3 May – On World Press Freedom Day, Amnesty International issues a statement claiming that journalism in Egypt has effectively become a crime over the past four years.
- 8 May – President Abdel-Fattah el-Sissi expanded his state-of-emergency powers in response to the increasing threat of COVID-19. As a result of the increased powers, public and private meetings, protests, celebrations and other forms of assembly can now be banned while taxes and utility payments can be postponed. The state of emergency had originally began in April 2017.
- 17 May – Lina Attalah, editor-in-chief for the independent news website Mada Masr, was arrested during an interview.

=== June ===
- 2 June – Egyptian-American Mohamed Soltan sued former Prime Minister Hazem El Beblawi for crimes against humanity. Soltan had been previously imprisoned in the country for 21 months after protesting against the 2013 Egyptian coup d'état.
- 17 – 20 June – Egyptian hackers engaged in cyber attacks against Ethiopia's security forces.
- 25 June – The IMF granted another US$5.2 billion loan to Egypt, bringing the total value of the loans at US$14.8 billion, in order to help the country's economy through the pandemic.
- 26 June – The country lifted numerous COVID-19 restrictions, allowing for the reopening of cafes, clubs, gyms and theaters following over three months of closure. Mosques and churches were also partially reopened while the nighttime curfew was completely lifted. The moves come despite a continued growth in cases and were aimed at reducing the economic burden of the pandemic.
- 27 June – Egypt executed Libyan militant Abdel-Rahim al-Mosmari for plotting an attack that killed at least 16 police officers in October 2017.

=== July ===
- 6 July
  - The government arrested several doctors and other medical workers who had criticized the governments handling of the COVID-19 pandemic.
  - Egyptian-American student Mohamed Amashah, age 24, is released from Tora Prison in Cairo after 16 months of captivity.
- 10 July
  - An Egyptian spy is uncovered in a German Press Office. He was looking for information on Egyptian opposition figures in Germany.
  - The government bans kite-flying and seizes 369 kites in Cairo and 99 in Alexandria, citing both safety and national security concerns.
- 13 July – In response to the complaints of at least 100 women of sexual assault, harassment, blackmail, and rape, activists set up @assaultpolice on Instagram to collect allegations. Many of the anonymous accounts come from students at The American University in Cairo and the American International School, one of the country's most expensive private high schools.

=== August ===
- 3 August – International Co-operation Minister Rania Al-Mashat invites billionaire Elon Musk to visit the country after he had tweeted, "Aliens built the pyramids obv." Archaeologist Zahi Hawass calls the tweet a "complete hallucination" and responds that the "pyramids [were] built by Egyptians."

=== September ===
- 7 September – Lawyers for the family of former President Mohamed Morsi said they obtained intelligence proving his youngest son, Abdullah, 25, was poisoned. In 2019, officials had claimed he had died of a heart attack.

=== October ===
- 3 October – The country unveiled 59 coffins of priests and clerks from the 26th dynasty nearly 2,500 years ago.

=== November ===
- November 8 – 2020 Egyptian parliamentary election
- November 12 – A man identified as Mohammed Hosni sets himself on fire in Cairo's Tahrir Square in protest in against corruption.
- November 19 – Three human rights activists belonging to the Egyptian Initiative for Personal Rights (EIPR) are arrested days for suspected links with a terror group days after meeting 13 foreign ambassadors and diplomats. UN Human Rights experts and the Office of the United Nations High Commissioner for Human Rights condemned Egypt for the arbitrary arrests and called for their release.

=== December ===
- December 8 – Human rights activists in Paris protest President Abdel-Fattah el-Sissi's state visit to France.
- December 29 – Ahmed Bassam Zaki, a former student at the American University in Cairo, is convicted of blackmail and sexual harassment of two women. Other charges of assault of girls as young as 14 will be heard on January 9, 2021.

=== Planned and scheduled events ===
- 6 October – Armed Forces Day (national holiday).
- 29 October – Mawlid (Muslim and national holiday).

== Deaths ==
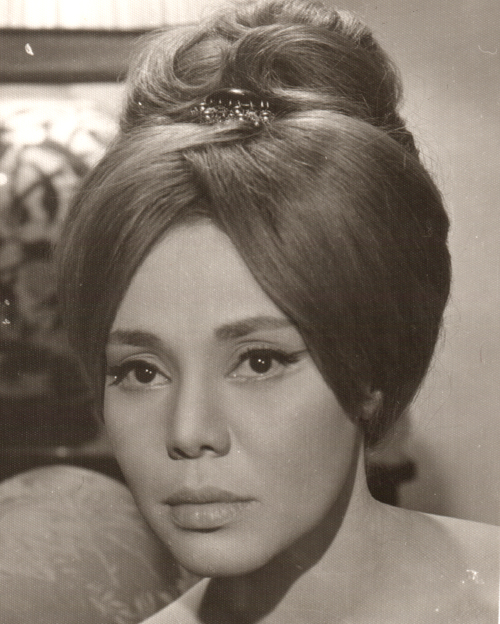
Magda al-Sabahi

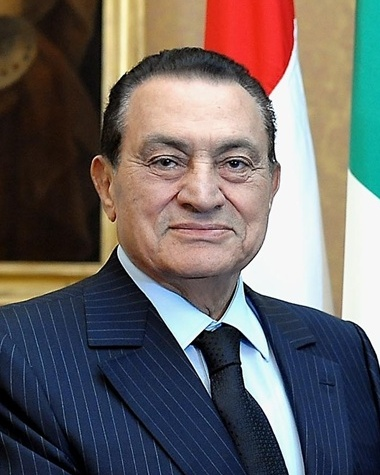
Hosni Mubarak

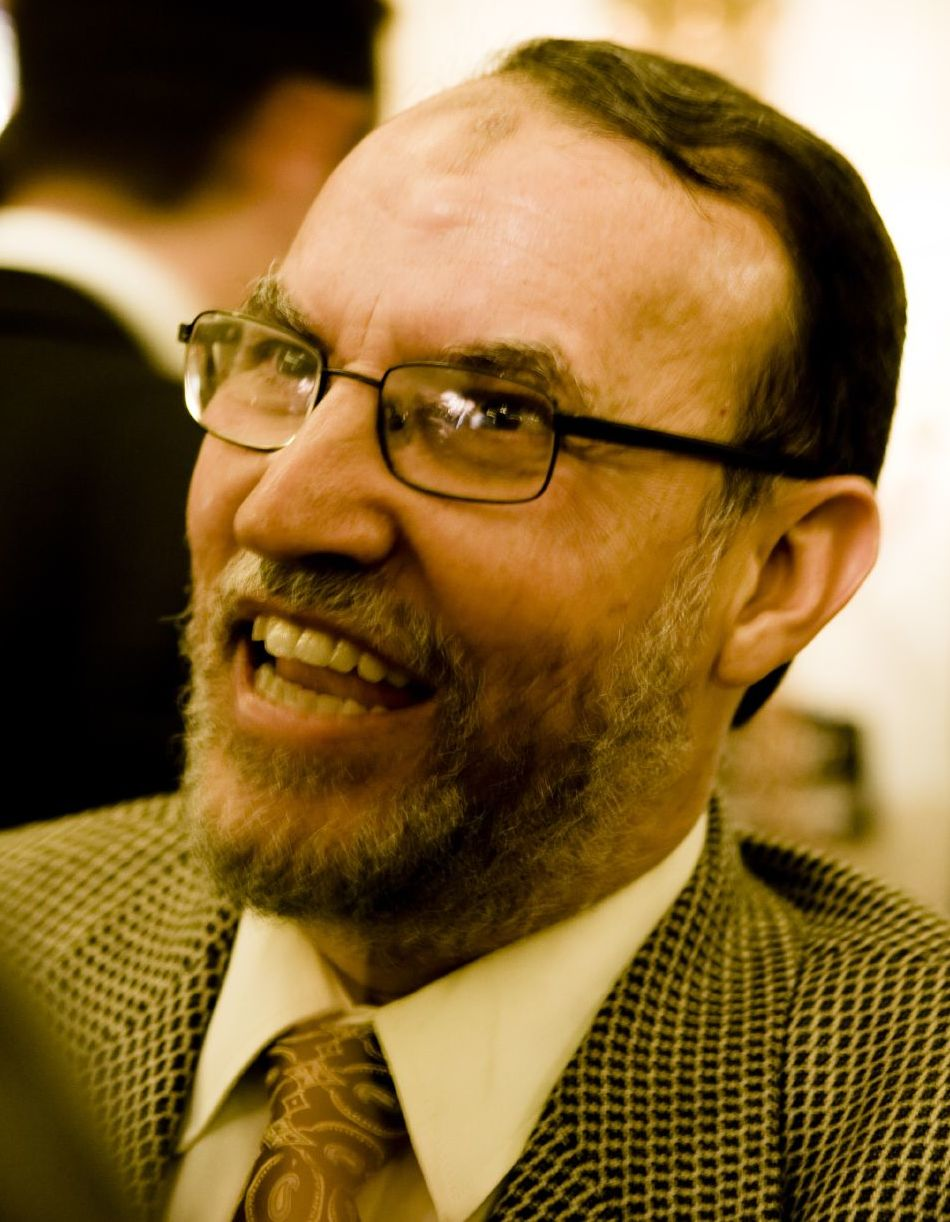
Essam el-Erian

=== January ===
- 16 January – Magda al-Sabahi, actress (b. 1931).
- 17 January
  - Ibrahim Farah, actor (b. 1951).
  - Nadia Rafik, actress (b. 1927).

=== February ===
- 4 February – Nadia Lutfi, actress (b. 1937).
- 7 February – Lenin El-Ramly, screenwriter (b. 1945).
- 15 February – Ahmed Abdel Rahman Nasser, air marshal (b. 1934).
- 25 February – Hosni Mubarak, military officer and politician, former President, Prime Minister and Vice-President (b. 1928).
- 28 February – Muhammad Imara, Islamic scholar (b. 1931).

=== March ===
- 28 March – George Sidhom, comedian and actor (b. 1938).

=== April ===
- 1 April – Mahmoud Zakzouk, politician (b. 1933).
- 5 April – Mahmoud Jibril, 67, acting Prime Minister of Libya (2011); died in Cairo of COVID-19

=== May ===
- 2 May – Shady Habash, filmmaker (b. 1995 or 1996).
- 22 May – Adam Henein, sculptor (b. 1929).
- 30 May – Hassan Hosny, actor (b. 1936).

=== June ===
- 6 June – Constantin Xenakis, painter (b. 1931).
- 14 June – Sarah Hegazi, LGBT rights activist (b. 1989).

=== July ===
- 5 July – Ragaa Al Geddawy, actress (b. 1934).
- 10 July – Mahmoud Reda, dancer, choreographer and Olympic gymnast (b. 1930).
- 28 July – Mohammed Al Mashali, physician (b. 1944).

=== August ===
- 2 August – Samia Amin, actress (b. 1945).
- 11 August – Edmond Kiraz, cartoonist and illustrator (b. 1923).
- 13 August – Essam el-Erian, politician (b. 1954).
- 14 August – Shwikar, actress (b. 1938).

=== September ===
- 5 September – Yousef Wali, politician and former Minister of Agriculture and Land Reclamation (b. 1930).
- 7 September – Aida Kamel, actress (b. 1931).
- 12 September – Azmi Mohamed Megahed, Olympic volleyball player (b. 1950).
- 26 September – Almontaser Bellah, 70, actor.
- 29 September – Abd al-Rahman Abd al-Khaliq, 80, Egyptian-Kuwaiti Islamic scholar and preacher; heart attack.

=== October ===
- 14 October Mahmoud Yassin, 79, actor.
- 24 October – Abu Muhsin al-Masri, 62, Islamic militant (al-Qaeda in the Indian Subcontinent); shot.

=== November ===
- 7 November – Moustafa Safouan, 99, psychoanalyst.
- 19 November – Fayek Azab, 77, actor.
- 28 November – Shams Badran, 91, politician, Minister of Defense (1966–1967).

== See also ==
- COVID-19 pandemic in Africa
- 2020 in North Africa
- 2020s
- African Union
- Arab League
- Terrorism in Egypt
- Grand Ethiopian Renaissance Dam
- List of George Floyd protests outside the United States
