= 1931 in Egypt =

- Decades: 1910s; 1920s; 1930s; 1940s; 1950s
- See also: Other events of 1931; List of years in Egypt

Events in the year 1931 in Egypt.

== Incumbents ==
- King: Fuad I of Egypt
- Prime minister: Ismail Sidky

== Births ==
- 8 February – Shadia, actress (d. 2017)
- 27 May – Faten Hamama, actress (d. 2015)
- 27 October – Nawal El Saadawi, feminist (d. 2021)
