= 2018 in Egypt =

- Decades: 1990s; 2000s; 2010s; 2020s
- See also: Other events of 2018; List of years in Egypt

Events in the year 2018 in Egypt.

== Incumbents ==
- President: Abdel Fattah el-Sisi
- Prime Minister: Sherif Ismail

== Events ==
- 9 February – Comprehensive Operation – Sinai 2018: North Sinai roads and towns are closed, schools and universities are suspended, and border crossings are restricted. The operation is announced on state TV, extending to the Nile Delta and Western Desert, with a nationwide security alert raised.
- 26 to 28 March – In the Egyptian presidential election, 2018, incumbent president Abdel Fattah el-Sisi is reelected with a majority of the votes.
- 23 April – the Egyptian photojournalist Mahmoud Abu Zeid, better known as "Shawkan", is awarded the 2018 UNESCO Press Freedom Award while in jail, where he faces charges for covering the 2013 protests and the violence that ensued.
- 2 June – Abdel Fattah el-Sisi is sworn in for his second term as President of Egypt before the House of Representatives in Cairo.
- 14 June – A new Egyptian government headed by Mostafa Madbouly is sworn in following his appointment as Prime Minister.
- 15–25 June – The Egypt national football team, led by manager Héctor Cúper and featuring forward Mohamed Salah, competes in the 2018 FIFA World Cup in Russia, its first appearance in the tournament since 1990.
- 13 November – A ceasefire has been reached between Israel and Hamas, which was brokered by Egypt.
- 15 December – Egyptian archeologists discover a 4,400 year old tomb from the Pharaonic period, belonging to a high priest called Wahtye, decorated with statues and hieroglyphs.

== Deaths ==
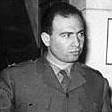
Khaled Mohieddin

- 1 January – Ebrahim Nafae, journalist (b. 1934).
- 29 March – Mohamed Shaker, diplomat and political scientist (b. 1933)
- 2 April – Ahmed Khaled Tawfik, novelist (b. 1962).
- 10 April – Samir Gharbo, water polo player (b. 1925).
- 6 May – Khaled Mohieddin, politician and military officer (b. 1922)
- 29 July – Anba Epiphanius, Coptic prelate, Abbot of Monastery of Saint Macarius the Great (b. 1954).
- 6 August – Sanaa Mazhar, actress (b. 1932).
