= 2019 in Egypt =

- Decades: 1990s; 2000s; 2010s; 2020s
- See also: Other events of 2019; List of years in Egypt

Events in the year 2019 in Egypt.

== Events ==
=== January ===
- 6 January – A bomb outside a Coptic church in Nasr City kills a policeman, two days before Christmas celebrations.
- 23 January – A car bombing targeting security forces in Giza killed or wounded 10 soldiers. HASM claimed responsibility for the attack.

=== February ===
- 7-20 February – Egypt executes 15 men in three waves, including nine for the 2015 assassination of former prosecutor Hisham Barakat; human rights groups criticize the trials.
- 27 February – Ramses Station rail disaster: A train smashes into a barrier inside Ramses Station in Cairo, Egypt, causing an explosion and a fire, killing 25 people and injuring 40 others.

=== April ===
- Constitutional amendments are approved in an unfair referendum, extending President al-Sisi’s term from four to six years and expanding his control over the judiciary.
- Egypt hosts the 64th Ordinary Session of the African Commission on Human and Peoples’ Rights (ACHPR) amid visa delays, sexual assault of two female participants, and physical surveillance of attendees.

=== June ===
- 21 June –The 2019 Africa Cup of Nations begins.

=== August ===
- 4 August – 2019 Cairo bombing: A car bombing outside Cairo’s National Cancer Institute kills 20 people and injures dozens.

=== September ===
- 20 September – Anti-government protests break out in Cairo, Suez, and other cities after corruption allegations are made against President Sisi.
- 22 September – 274 protesters are arrested in Cairo, Suez City, Port Said, Alexandria, and other cities after the actor and contractor Mohamed Ali alleges Sisi and top military officers are enriching themselves by building palaces and hotels.

=== October ===
- Archaeologists unearth 30 ancient wooden coffins with inscriptions and paintings in Luxor; the coffins are later moved to the Grand Egyptian Museum near the Giza Pyramids.
- The European Parliament adopts a resolution condemning the abuse in Egypt and North Sinai.

== Deaths ==
=== March ===
- 23 March – Abdel Hadi Kandil, chemist and politician (born 1935)

=== May ===
- 5 May – Hani Shukrallah, journalist (born 1950)

=== June ===
- 5 June – Mohamed Negm, actor and comedian (born 1944)
- 17 June – Mohamed Morsi, former President of Egypt (born 1951)

=== July ===
- 1 July – Ezzat Abou Aouf, actor (born 1948)
- 21 July – Adel Zaky, Roman Catholic prelate (born 1947)
- 25 July – Farouk al-Fishawy, actor (born 1952)

=== September ===
- 4 September – Abdullah Morsi, son of Mohamed Morsi (born 1994)

=== November ===
- 7 November – Haitham Ahmed Zaki, actor (born 1984)
