= 1925 in Egypt =

- Decades: 1900s; 1910s; 1920s; 1930s; 1940s
- See also: Other events of 1925; List of years in Egypt

Events in the year 1925 in Egypt.

== Incumbents ==
- King: Fuad I of Egypt
- Prime minister: Ahmad Ziwar Pasha

== Events ==
- January 25 – The tomb of Tutankhamun is reopened to allow Howard Carter to resume his archaeological investigation. Some artefacts are found to be damaged as a result of careless storage by the antiquities department.
- March 23 – 1925 Egyptian parliamentary election

== Births ==
- March 13 – Samir Gharbo, Egyptian water polo player (died 2018)
