= 2014 in Egypt =

- Decades: 1990s; 2000s; 2010s; 2020s
- See also: Other events of 2014; List of years in Egypt

The following lists events from 2014 in Egypt.

== Incumbents ==
- President:

Adly Mansour (until 8 June)
Abdel Fattah el-Sisi (starting 8 June)

- Prime Minister:

Hazem Al Beblawi (until 1 March)
Ibrahim Mahlab (starting 17 June)

== Events ==
=== January ===
- January 3 – Thirteen people are killed in clashes between Muslim Brotherhood supporters, police and opponents.
- January 14 – Voters in Egypt go to the polls for the first day of voting on a new constitution.
- January 15 – Egyptians vote on a constitution that will ban political parties based on religion, give women equal rights and protect the status of minority Coptic Christians.
- January 17 – Two people were shot dead as clashes between Muslim Brotherhood supporters and police flared up.
- January 18 – The Egyptian Constitution of 2014 was passed in the Egyptian constitutional referendum. New changes to the Egyptian constitution include:
  - The president may serve two four-year terms and can be impeached by parliament.
  - Islam remains the state religion – but freedom of belief is absolute, giving some protection to minorities.
  - The state guarantees "equality between men and women".
  - Parties may not be formed based on "religion, race, gender or geography".
  - Military to appoint defence minister for next eight years.
- January 24–25 – Three bombs exploded at the Egyptian National Police and Ain Shams district of Eastern Cairo, respectively.
- January 25 – 64 people are killed in anti-government marches.

=== February ===
- February 4 – Archaeologists working near the ancient settlement of Edfu in southern Egypt discover the remains of a 4,600-year-old step pyramid.
- February 13 – During a two-day visit by an Egyptian delegation in Moscow, Russian Foreign Minister Sergey Lavrov said that Moscow and Cairo have agreed to speed up work on drafting agreements on military-technological cooperation. Russian Defense Minister Sergey Shoigu added that this could include joint military exercises and training of Egyptian officers in Russian military academies. Russian President Vladimir Putin says he supports Egyptian Defense Minister Abdel Fattah el-Sisi's bid for the upcoming presidential election in Egypt.
- February 16 – A bus bombing occurs on a tourist coach in Taba, Egypt.
- February 20 – Egyptian security officials say army helicopter gunships have rocketed several houses where militants were thought to have gathered in the northern region of the Sinai Peninsula, killing at least 10.
- February 24 – The government of Egypt resign en masse, allowing Abdel Fattah al-Sisi to run for president.
- February 26 – An Egyptian court sentences 26 people to death in absentia for plotting attacks on ships passing through the Suez Canal.

=== March ===
- March 4 – An Egyptian court bans the Palestinian group Hamas and orders its offices in the country to be shut down and all dealings with the group suspended. The court also brands it as a terrorist organization.
- March 5 – An 1,800-year-old Egyptian papyrus discovered a century ago, whose inscription is nearly illegible to the naked eye, has been made more readable using infrared sensors, revealing the message to be a soldier's letter to his family.
- March 7 – A statue of Iset, daughter of King Amenhotep III who was the grandfather of Tutankhamun and ruler of Ancient Egypt around 3,350 years ago, has been unearthed by a team of Egyptian and European archaeologists. The statue, which depicts Iset alone without her father, is the first of its kind ever discovered.
- March 13 – Masked gunmen attack a bus carrying Egyptian Army soldiers in Cairo, killing one.
- March 19 – Two Egyptian army officers and five militants are killed during a warehouse raid in Qalyubiya province north of Cairo.
- March 24 – A court in Minya, Egypt, sentences 528 supporters of former President Mohammed Morsi to death for a range of offenses including murdering a policeman and attacks on people and property. It is the largest mass death sentence handed down in recent history anywhere in the world.
- March 25 – Mohammed Badie, the guide of Egypt's Muslim Brotherhood, will appear in court with 680 others to face charges of incitement to kill.
- March 26 – Egyptian Field Marshal Abdel Fattah el-Sisi resigns from his position as Minister of Defense and announces his bid for the upcoming presidential election.
- March 30 – Electoral authorities in Egypt set the first round of the presidential election for 26–27 May.

=== April ===
- April 2 – A bomb detonates near Cairo University killing a police chief and injuring 5 others.
- April 5–23 people are killed in a gunfight between feuding tribes near Aswan.
- April 6 – Two more people are killed in Aswan in a third day of clashes and the death toll rises to 25.
- April 15 – A bomb detonates at a traffic police post in Cairo injuring 3 people.
- April 16 – A Soyuz-U rocket carrying a new Egyptian communication satellite, EgyptSat-2, was launched from the Baikonur Cosmodrome in Kazakhstan.
- April 18 – A police officer is killed and another is wounded after a bomb detonates in a busy square in Cairo's Mohandessin district.
- April 20 – Gunmen killed an Egyptian intelligence officer and a policeman on a desert road outside Cairo in a late-night firefight.
- April 23 – An Egyptian general is killed and a police officer is injured after a bomb attached to the general's car exploded.
- April 27 – An Egyptian court sentences 11 supporters of deposed President Mohammed Morsi to prison terms ranging from five to 88 years for rioting.
- April 28 – An Egyptian court hands down a death sentence on 638 Muslim Brotherhood supporters, among them the group's top leader Mohamed Badie.
- April 28 – An Egyptian court bans the April 6 Youth Movement over claims of espionage and of "damaging the image of the state".

=== May ===
- May 27 – Abdel Fattah el-Sisi, a member of the Independent party, won the 2014 Egyptian presidential election.

=== June ===
- June 8 – President Abdel Fattah el-Sisi assumed office.
- June 17 – The cabinet of Egyptian Prime Minister Ibrahim Mahlab assumed office.

=== July ===
- July 19 – An armed assault was perpetrated against a military checkpoint in the New Valley Governorate, killing at least 22 border guards.

=== August ===
August 14 – Rabia square is bombed and attacked by the Egyptian military. More than 2,500-3000 protesters have died.

=== November ===
- November 12 – Gunmen attack an Egyptian Navy ship on the Mediterranean Sea with eight sailors missing and four injured after the attack. Thirty-two of the gunmen have been captured with four reported as dead.
- November 25 – A block of flats collapses in Cairo killing at least 10 people.
- November 26 – An Egyptian court sentences 78 teenage boys to between 2 and 5 years in jail for participating in rallies calling for the return of ousted President Mohammed Mursi.
- November 28 – Three army officers and two protesters are killed and more than one hundred protesters are arrested during anti-government protests across Egypt.
- November 29 – A Cairo court clears former President of Egypt Hosni Mubarak on murder charges related to the death of hundreds of protesters in the 2011 Egyptian revolution.

=== December ===
- December 2 – An Egyptian court sentences 185 people to death over their alleged involvement in a lethal attack on a police station on the outskirts of Cairo.
- December 14 – Eleven Egyptian fishermen drown after their boat sinks in the Gulf of Suez.
- December 21 – Egypt temporarily reopens its border crossing with Gaza, which had been closed since October, until 4 pm Monday.

== Deaths ==
- November 23 – Metropolitan Mikhail of Asyut (b. 1921)

== See also ==
- Public holidays in Egypt
- Egypt at the 2014 Summer Youth Olympics
- Egyptian Constitution of 2014
- Egyptian constitutional referendum, 2014
- Islamist unrest in Egypt (2013–present)
- 2014 Egypt national football team games
- 2014 Miss Egypt beauty pageant
- 2014 FIFA World Cup qualification (CAF)
- 2014 Sinai insurgency
