= 2021 in Egypt =

- Decades: 2000s; 2010s; 2020s
- See also: Other events of 2021; List of years in Egypt

Events in the year 2021 in Egypt.

== Incumbents ==
- President of Egypt: Abdel Fattah el-Sisi
- Prime Minister of Egypt: Moustafa Madbouly

== Events ==
Ongoing – COVID-19 pandemic in Egypt

=== January and February ===
- 12 January – An appeals court acquits Haneen Hossam and Mawada al-Adham imprisoned for "attacking society’s values" over videos they published on TikTok. Hossam, 20, still faces charges of human trafficking.
- 18 January – Direct flights between Egypt and Qatar are renewed for the first time since 2017. 300,000 Egyptians live in Qatar.
- 19 January – A female baker is arrested for ″violating family values″ for allegedly baking sexually-suggestive cupcakes. The arrest became the hottest topic on social media and is the most recent incident in a struggle for increased freedom of expression.
- 24 January – COVID-19 pandemic: Egypt begins vaccinating healthcare workers. More than 300 doctors have died.
- 4 February – The government frees journalist Mahmoud Hussein of Al Jazeera after five years in prison on charge of spreading false news.
- 17 February – Egypt buys 168 RIM-116 Rolling Airframe Missiles for US$197 million.
- 18 February – President Abdel Fattah el-Sisi and Libyan Prime Minister Abdul Hamid Mohammed Dbeibah meet in Cairo.

=== March and April ===
- 6 March – President El-Sissi meets with Sudanese general Abdel Fattah al-Burhan in Khartoum.
- 11 March – 2021 Cairo clothing factory fire
- 23 March – The Suez Canal is blocked as the 400-meter (1,300 ft), 224,000-ton Ever Given runs aground during a sandstorm.
- 24 March – 15 killed and 12 injured in a multi-car crash at a checkpoint.
- 26 March – Sohag train collision: Thirty-two killed and 66 injured. A later report was that 19 were killed and 165 injured.
- 27 March – An apartment building collapses in Gesr Suez district, killing 25.
- 28 March
  - 2021 Suez Canal obstruction
    - Prime Minister Abdel Fatah al-Sissi orders officials of the Suez Canal Authority (SCA) to begin preparations for the removal of containers. Efforts continue to refloat the ship during high tide with the aid of dredgers and an excavator on land.
    - The Ever Given is liberated and moved to the Great Bitter Lake for inspection.
- 30 March – Renaissance Dam: President el-Sissi warns that Nile River waters are “untouchable".
- 2 April – Roads are shut down as twenty-two mummies, mostly from the New Kingdom, are moved to the National Museum of Egyptian Civilization in Fustat.
- 18 April – Toukh train accident

=== November ===
- 13 November - Scorpions have infested Egypt’s southern city of Aswan, killing three people and stinging more than 400. According to local media, the mass scorpion attack was caused by severe thunderstorms in the city in recent days. Reports state the scorpions were washed into the streets and peoples’ homes, where they were seeking refuge from the intense weather conditions.

== Sports ==
- 13 to 31 January – 2021 World Men's Handball Championship
- 25 August to 6 September – Egypt at the 2020 Summer Paralympics

== Deaths ==
=== January to March ===
- 2 January – Wahid Hamed, 76, Egyptian screenwriter (Terrorism and Kebab, Ma'ali al Wazir, The Yacoubian Building).
- 13 January – Sylvain Sylvain, 69, Egyptian-born American guitarist (New York Dolls); cancer.
- 14 January – Safwat El-Sherif, 87, politician, Minister of Information (1981–2004); leukemia.
- 24 January – Abla Al-Kahlawi, 72, preacher, Laws academic and social worker; COVID-19.
- 29 January – Mahmoud Abdel-Ghaffar, 60, actor.
- 5 February – Ezzat El Alaili, 86, actor (The Land, Alexandria... Why?, War in the Land of Egypt).
- 25 February – Hussein F. Sabbour, 85, civil engineer and architect.
- 28 February
  - Ahlam Elgretly, 73, actress; heart attack.
  - Yousuf Shaaban, 83, actor (There is a Man in our House, Mother of the Bride, My Wife, the Director General), COVID-19.
- 4 March – Kamal Amer, politician and military officer, governor of Aswan (1999–2001) and Matrouh (1997–1999), senator (2012–2013); COVID-19.
- 6 March – Sawsan Rabie, 59, actress; complications from COVID-19.
- 12 March – Malik 'Iismaeil, 84, television presenter.
- 16 March – Adel Hashem, 82, actor and director.
- 19 March – Mona Badr, 84, actress.
- 21 March – Nawal El Saadawi, 89, feminist.
- 31 March – Kamal Ganzouri, 88, politician, Prime Minister of Egypt (1996–1999, 2011–2012).
- 20 May - Samir Ghanem, 84, actor; COVID-19.
- 9 July – Jehan Sadat, 87, Human Rights Activist, third First Lady of Egypt (1970-1981).

=== October to December ===
- 3 November – Hassan Al Alfi, police major and politician (born 1936)

== See also ==
- COVID-19 pandemic in Africa
- 2020s
- African Union
- Arab League
- Terrorism in Egypt
- Grand Ethiopian Renaissance Dam
- African Continental Free Trade Area
- Common Market for Eastern and Southern Africa
