= 1991 in Egypt =

- Decades: 1970s; 1980s; 1990s; 2000s; 2010s
- See also: Other events of 1991; List of years in Egypt

The following lists events from 1991 in Egypt.

== Incumbents ==
- President – Hosni Mubarak
- Prime Minister – Atef Sedky

== Events ==
- 20 September – 1 October – The All-Africa Games are held in Cairo.

== Births ==
- 16 January – Mohammad Sanad, handball player
- 17 September – Mena Massoud, Egyptian-born Canadian actor

== Deaths ==
- 3 August – Ali Sabri, politician (b. 1920)
