= 2013 in Egypt =

- Decades: 1990s; 2000s; 2010s; 2020s
- See also: Other events of 2013; List of years in Egypt

== Incumbents ==
- President:

Mohamed Morsi (until 3 July)
Adly Mansour (starting 4 July).

- Vice President: Mohamed ElBaradei (starting 14 July until 14 August)
- Prime Minister:

Hesham Qandil (until 8 July),
Hazem Al Beblawi (starting 9 July)

== See also ==
- Sinai insurgency
