= 1922 in Egypt =

- Decades: 1900s; 1910s; 1920s; 1930s; 1940s
- See also: Other events of 1922; List of years in Egypt

Events in the year 1922 in Egypt.

== Incumbents ==
- King: Fuad I of Egypt
- Prime minister: Adly Yakan Pasha (until 1 March); Abdel Khalek Sarwat Pasha (until 30 November); Mohamed Tawfik Naseem Pasha (onwards)

== Events ==
- April 24 – The first portion of the Imperial Wireless Chain, a strategic international wireless telegraphy network created to link the British Empire, is opened, from the UK to Egypt.
- November 4 – Discovery of the tomb of Tutankhamun: in Egypt, English archaeologist Howard Carter and his men find the entrance to the pharaonic tomb of Tutankhamun in the Valley of the Kings.

== Births ==
- April 1 – Saad el-Shazly, Egyptian military commander (d. 2011)
- July 13 – Helmy Afify Abd El-Bar, Egyptian military commander (d. 2011)
- November 14 – Boutros Boutros-Ghali, Secretary-General of the United Nations (d. 2016)
