= 1952 in Egypt =

- Decades: 1930s; 1940s; 1950s; 1960s; 1970s
- See also: Other events of 1952; List of years in Egypt

Events in the year 1952 in Egypt.

== Incumbents ==
- Monarch: Farouk (until 28 July); Fuad II (starting 28 July)
- Prime Minister:
  - until 27 January: Mostafa El-Nahas
  - 27 January – 2 March – Aly Maher Pasha
  - 2 March – 2 July – Ahmed Naguib el-Hilaly
  - 2 July – 22 July – Hussein Sirri Pasha
  - 22 July – 23 July – Ahmed Naguib el-Hilaly
  - 23 July – 7 September – Aly Maher Pasha
  - starting 7 September: Mohamed Naguib

== Events ==
- 27 January – Aly Maher Pasha became the Prime Minister of Egypt for the 3rd time.
- 2 March – Aly Maher Pasha resigned.

== Births ==
- 16 January – Fuad II of Egypt, The last King of Egypt and the Sudan from July 1952 to June 1953
- 4 March – Saad El-Katatni, The first Speaker of the People's Assembly after the Egyptian Revolution of 2011
- 8 July – Ahmed Nazif, Prime Minister of Egypt from 14 July 2004 to 29 January 2011
- 15 August – Ahmed Zulfikar, Mechanical Engineer and Entrepreneur (died 2010)
- 20 August – Youssef Boutros Ghali, Minister of Finance from 2004 to 2011
- 20 October – Sameh Shoukry, Minister of Foreign Affairs of Egypt since 2014
- 4 November – Pope Tawadros II of Alexandria, the 118th and current pope of Alexandria and patriarch of the See of St. Mark

== Deaths ==
- 5 August – Sameera Moussa, the first female Egyptian nuclear physicist
