= 2017 in Egypt =

- Decades: 1990s; 2000s; 2010s; 2020s
- See also: Other events of 2017; List of years in Egypt

Events in the year 2017 in Egypt.

== Incumbents ==
- President: Abdel Fattah el-Sisi
- Prime Minister: Sherif Ismail

== Events ==
- 9 April – The Palm Sunday church bombings, twin suicide bombings that took place at St. George's Church in Tanta, and Saint Mark's Coptic Orthodox Cathedral in Alexandria, killed at least 45 people and injured more than 100.
- 26 April - Live bullets were fired on protestors during the 2016–17 Egyptian protests who were protesting the selling of Tiran and Sanafir to Saudi Arabia.
- 26 May – Egyptian military launch airstrikes against Libyan targets due to terrorist attack which killed 26 Coptic Christians.
- 7 July – A car bomb at a police checkpoint was set off by suspected ISIS militants, followed by heavy gunfire, responsible for killing 26 people. The attackers also wounded 20 others in al-Barth, near Rafah.
- 11 August – Alexandria train collision.
- 16 October – A bank in Al Arish, North Sinai was robbed by terrorists of local currency equivalent to about US $1 million. Seven people including 3 civilians were killed in the gunfire from the assailants.
- 20 October – The ambush of an ESF convoy near al-Baharia Oasis in the Western Desert occurred, with at least 16 police officers killed and 15 injured. The group claiming responsibility was Ansar al-Islam, known to have links to al-Qa'ida. Some reports said the number of deaths was more than 50.
- 24 November – At the Al Rawdah Mosque in North Sinai 312 people were massacred, including 27 children as well as wounding 128 while at Friday prayers. It was the deadliest attack made in Egypt by suspected ISIS-Sinai terrorists.

=== Sport ===
- 1-9 July – the 2017 FIBA Under-19 Basketball World Cup was held in Cairo
- 27 July – the 2017 World Aquatics Championships in Budapest, Hungary: Farida Osman, aged 22, won the Bronze medal winner for the 50-meter Butterfly Heat with a time of 25.39 seconds. She became the first Egyptian Swimmer to ever win a World Championship Medal. Osman broke five African records in the process.
- 18-25 August – the 2017 FIVB Volleyball Men's U23 World Championship, volleyball event hosted by Egypt
- 18 September – Karate - Mediterranean Championships: Crowned champions of 2017 for Cadets, Juniors, and U21s. Egypt was at the top with 35 medals (20 gold, 9 silver, 6 bronze).
- 27 November – 3 December: Men's World Team Squash Championship: Egypt beat England in Marseille clinching their fourth WSF Championship title.
- 28 November – 5 December: International World Federation (IWF) 2017 World Weight Lifting Championships in Anaheim, California. Weightlifter Sara Samir clinched the gold medal lifting 136 kg. Mohamed Ehab won three gold medals for Egypt in Anaheim. making history for Egypt for the first time in 66 years.
- 18 December – Squash - PSA World Championship gained a double victory: Mohamed ElShorbagy beat brother Marwan winning his first PSA World Championship. The women's title was won by Raneem El Welily.
- December: Taekwondo - French Open: Hedaya Malak (67 kg) and Mohamed Farag (58 kg) won two silver medalsin the 13th French Open.

== Deaths ==
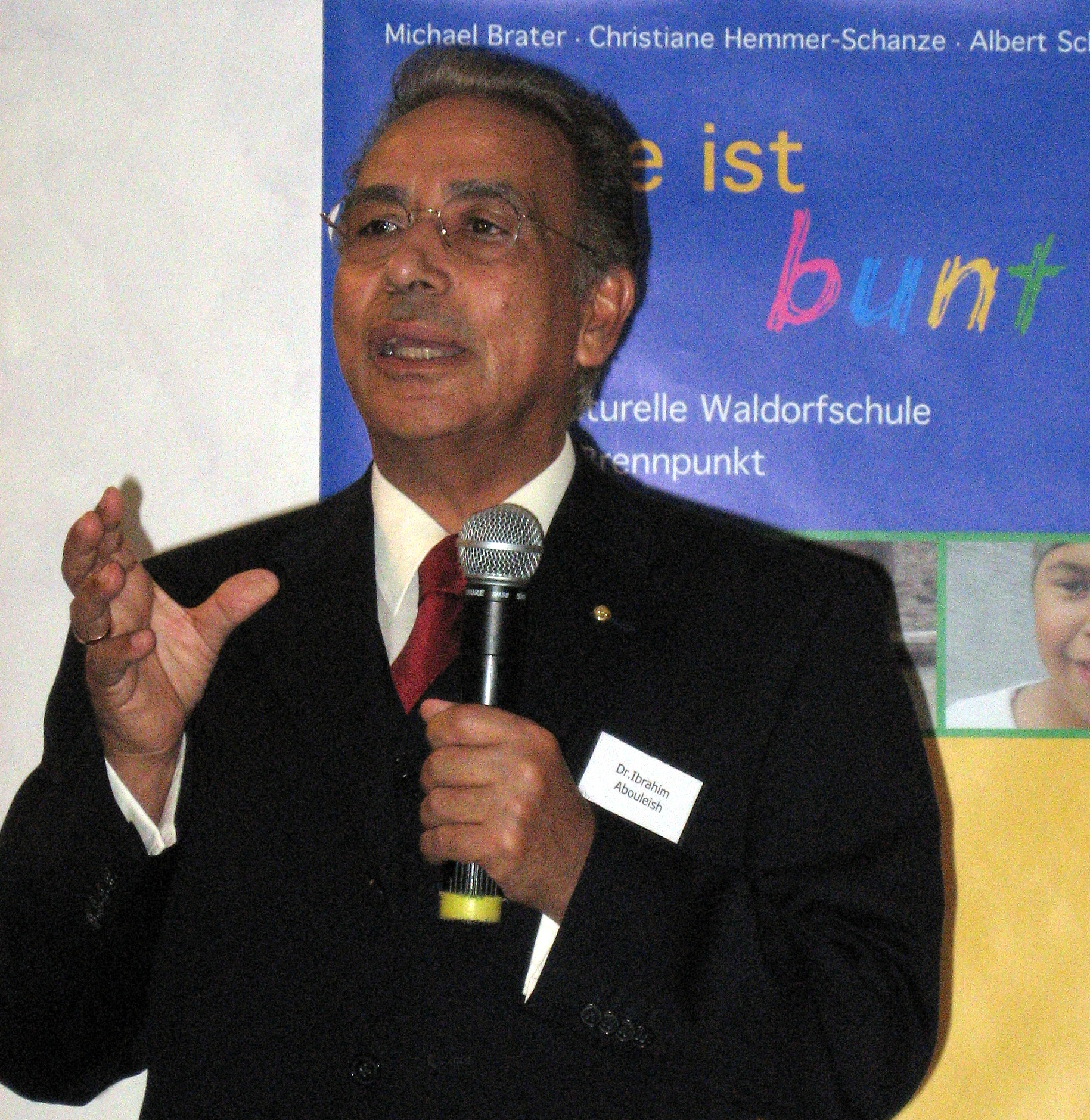
Ibrahim Abouleish

- 6 January – Awad Moukhtar Halloudah, swimmer (born 1931)
- 12 January – Karima Mokhtar, actress (born 1934)
- 1 April – Talaat al-Shayeb, author (born 1942)
- 4 April – Samir Farid, writer and film critic (born 1943)
- 15 June – Ibrahim Abouleish, pharmacologist (born 1937)
- 7 July – Ahmed Mansi, SEAL military commander (born 1978)

== See also ==
- List of Egyptian films of 2017
