= 2016 in Egypt =

- Decades: 1990s; 2000s; 2010s; 2020s
- See also: Other events of 2016; List of years in Egypt

Events in the year 2016 in Egypt.

== Incumbents ==
- President: Abdel Fattah el-Sisi
- Prime Minister: Sherif Ismail

== Events ==
=== January ===
- 8 January - Sinai insurgency: Two suspected ISIL attackers were killed and three tourists were injured in an unsuccessful attack on a hotel in the city of Hurghada.

=== February ===
- 3 February: The discovering of the murder of Giulio Regeni, an Italian researcher who was abducted and tortured to death, results in a diplomatic tension between governments of Italy and Egypt.

=== March ===
- March 29 - EgyptAir Flight 181, an Airbus A320, was hijacked and was forced to land at Cyprus. The hijacker claimed to have an explosive belt, but surrendered 7 hours later. Authorities found out he did not have any explosives.

=== May ===
- May 19 - EgyptAir Flight 804 between Paris and Cairo disappears with 56 passengers and 10 crew on board. The plane was at 37,000 feet when it disappeared ten minutes before entering Egyptian airspace over the Mediterranean Sea. It is later reported to have crashed off the Greek island of Karpathos with terrorism suspected.

=== August ===
- August 5-21 - 38 athletes from Egypt competed in the 2016 Summer Olympics in Rio de Janeiro, Brazil. Egypt brought home 3 bronze metals.

=== December ===
- December 11 - The Coptic Orthodox Botroseya church was bombed with the fatalities resulting in 29 deaths and 49 non-fatal injuries. Daesh was blamed.

== Deaths ==
- 11 August – Hamdi Al Banbi, engineer and politician (born 1935)
- 29 October – Rami Hassanein, officer (born 1975)
