= 2015 in Egypt =

- Decades: 1990s; 2000s; 2010s; 2020s
- See also: Other events of 2015; List of years in Egypt

The following lists events that happened during 2015 in Egypt.

== Incumbents ==
- President: Abdel Fattah el-Sisi
- Prime Minister:

Ibrahim Mahlab (until 19 September)
Sherif Ismail (starting 19 September)

== Events ==
=== January ===
- January 13 - Egypt's highest court overturns the only remaining conviction against former President Hosni Mubarak (a May 2014 sentencing of three years in prison for embezzlement.
- January 24 - Shaimaa al-Sabbagh, a 32-year-old member of the Socialist Popular Alliance Party, is shot dead by Egyptian police during a march in Cairo to commemorate the hundreds of demonstrators killed during the Arab Spring uprising of 2011.
- January 25 - At least than 18 people are killed, including 3 police cadets, during violent protests that erupted throughout the country on the anniversary of the 2011 uprising.
- January 29 - Sinai Insurgency: A series of attacks by ISIL-affiliated militants kill 44 people, including 14 civilians, in North Sinai.

=== February ===
- February 9 - In Cairo, Egypt clashes between Egyptian police and fans of Zamalek SC kill 22. The Egyptian authorities have suspended football league matches indefinitely.
- February 13 - An Egyptian court orders the release from prison of Canadian journalist Mohamed Fahmy in Cairo.
- February 15–21 Coptic Christians, Egyptian migrant workers, are beheaded by ISIL in Libya.
- February 16 - Following the killings of 21 of their citizens, Egypt responds with a number of airstrikes in Libya.
- February 18 - Qatar withdraws its ambassador from Egypt following disagreement over Egyptian Air Force strikes against ISIL targets in Libya after their killing of 21 Coptic Christian hostages.

=== March ===
- March 8 - A bomb explodes outside a French supermarket in Alexandria, killing one person and wounding six.
- March 10 - Sinai Insurgency: A suicide bomber kills one person and injures 24 in an attack on a police station in the Sinai Peninsula.
- March 13–15 - The launch of the Egypt Economic Development Conference at the Red Sea City of Sharm el-Sheikh, with over 2,000 delegates from 112 different countries in Egypt to attend the conference.
- March 16 - An Egyptian court hands down a death sentence to Muslim Brotherhood leader Mohammed Badie and thirteen others.
- March 21–35 people are killed when a bus falls from a bridge into a canal near Giza.

=== April ===
- April 12 - Sinai Insurgency: At least 14 people killed and dozens injured in attacks by ISIL-affiliated militants as part of ongoing Sinai insurgency.
- April 21 - Former President of Egypt, Mohamed Morsi, is sentenced to 20 years in prison for his role in the arrest and torture of protesters during his tenure as President.

=== May ===
- May 16 - Ousted President, Mohamed Morsi, is sentenced to death for his role in a number of jailbreaks carried out by the Muslim Brotherhood during the 2011 Egypt uprising, a sentence which would be overturned a year and a half later.

=== June ===
- June 16 - Death sentence of ex-President Mohamed Morsi confirmed and finalized, followed by condemnation by Amnesty International.
- June 18 - Mohamed Morsi, former President of Egypt, is sentenced to life in prison for supplying classified documents to Qatar during his time as President.

=== July ===
- July 1 - Sinai Insurgency: Over 100 dead in clashes between Egyptian security forces and ISIL-affiliated militants in the area of Sheikh Zuweid in North Sinai.
- July 11 - Bombing of the Italian Consulate in Cairo.

=== August ===
- August 20 - Bomb outside of Cairo courthouse injures 30, ISIL-affiliate Sinai Province takes responsibility for attack.

=== October ===
- October 17-December 2 - Egyptian Parliamentary Elections take place, featuring a low turnout and voter indifference. It is criticized both by foreign bodies and Egyptian opposition as being undemocratic, due to exclusion of opposition parties.
- October 31 - Metrojet Flight 9268, flying from Sharm El Sheikh, Egypt to Saint Petersburg, Russia disintegrates over northern Sinai, killing all 224 people aboard. Local ISIL branch, Sinai Province, take responsibility for the destruction of the plane.

=== December ===
- December 4 - The 2015 Men's World Team Squash Championships are cancelled following the death of 16 people from a petrol bomb attack in a restaurant.

== Arts and Culture ==
=== January ===
- January 5 - A Czech archaeological team discovers the tomb of formerly unknown Ancient Egyptian queen Khentakawess III who lived during the Fifth Dynasty.

== Deaths ==
- 17 January - Faten Hamama, actress (born 1931)
- 29 June - Hisham Barakat, Prosecutor General of Egypt (born 1950)
- 10 July - Omar Sharif, actor (born 1932)
- 15 November - Said Tarabeek, actor (born 1941)
- 19 November - Madiha Salem, actress (born 1944)
- 1 December - Edwar al-Kharrat, novelist (born 1926)
