= 1951 in Egypt =

- Decades: 1930s; 1940s; 1950s; 1960s; 1970s
- See also: Other events of 1951; List of years in Egypt

Events in the year 1951 in Egypt.

== Incumbents ==
- Monarch: Farouk
- Prime Minister: Mostafa El-Nahas

== Births ==
- 9 January – Ahmed Seif El-Islam, Egyptian Activist (died 2014)
- 26 January – Mohamed Orabi, former Foreign Minister of Egypt.
- 23 May – Hisham Bastawisy, Egyptian judge and the vice president of the Egyptian Court of Cassation (died 2021)
- 8 August – Mohamed Morsi, the fifth president of Egypt (died 2019)
- 15 October – Abdel Moneim Aboul Fotouh, Egyptian physician

== Deaths ==
- 30 April – Nabawiyya Musa, Egyptian Nationalist and Feminist (born 1866)
