= 2012 in Egypt =

- Decades: 1990s; 2000s; 2010s; 2020s
- See also: Other events of 2012; List of years in Egypt

Events from the year 2012 in Egypt.

== Incumbents ==
- President:

Supreme Council of the Armed Forces (until 30 June)
Mohamed Morsi (starting 30 June)

- Vice President: Mahmoud Mekki (12 August–22 December)
- Prime Minister:

Kamal Ganzouri (until 2 August)
Hesham Qandil (starting 2 August)

== Events ==
=== February ===
- 1 February – A massive riot took place at Port Said Stadium, following a match between Al Ahly SC and Al Masry SC.
- 22 February – 2012 Egyptian Shura Council election concluded with Freedom and Justice Party gaining the majority.

=== March ===
- 26 March – a constitutional assembly was formed to draft a new Constitution of Egypt.

=== May ===
- 10 May – First presidential debate was held and was broadcast live.
- 23 to 24 May – First round of the 2012 Egyptian presidential election. Mohamed Morsi and Ahmed Shafik proceeding into the second round.
- 31 May – State of Emergency enacted under Hosni Mubarak's administration formally ended.

=== June ===
- 2 June – Hosni Mubarak, former President of Egypt, was sentenced to life imprisonment.
- 16 to 17 June – Second round of the 2012 Egyptian presidential election. Mohamed Morsi was elected as the fifth President of Egypt.
- 30 June – Mohamed Morsi was sworn in to the office of presidency, being the first Egyptian president to be democratically elected.

=== July ===
- 8 July – Mohamed Morsi declared the nullification of an edict by the previous military government, and called for the return of the elected parliament.

=== August ===
- 2 August – Hesham Qandil was sworn in as the Prime Minister of Egypt.
- 5 August – A terror attack in Sinai resulted in the death of 16 Egyptian soldiers.
- 12 August – Mahmoud Mekki was appointed as the Vice President of Egypt and Abdel Fattah el-Sisi was appointed as the Minister of Defence.

=== September ===
- 11 September – Violent demonstration erupted in Egypt in reaction to Innocence of Muslims, an anti-Islamic YouTube video written by Egyptian-American writer Nakoula Basseley Nakoula.
- 18 September – A Coptic Christian teacher was sentenced for six years in jail for posting drawings of Muhammad and insulting president Mohamed Morsi on Facebook.
- 19 September – Egyptian Bloc, a liberal political alliance in opposition to the Muslim Brotherhood, was dissolved.
- 21 September – Three Egyptian militants crossed Egyptian-Israeli border and killed one Israeli soldier before being shot.

=== November ===
- 17 November – A railway accident in Manfalut resulted in the death of 50 school children and one bus driver.
- 22 November – Mohamed Morsi issued a presidential decree that immunized the president's actions since taking office from any judicial review.

=== December ===
- 13 to 22 December – A referendum over the passage of Egyptian Constitution of 2012. Mahmoud Mekki resigned from being the Vice President of Egypt.
- 26 December – Egyptian Constitution of 2012 was signed into effect by president Mohamed Morsi.

== Deaths ==
- 17 March – Pope Shenouda III of Alexandria, leader of Coptic Orthodox Church of Alexandria (born 1923)
- 19 July – Omar Suleiman, former Vice President of Egypt (born 1936)
