= 2011 in Egypt =

- Decades: 1990s; 2000s; 2010s; 2020s
- See also: Other events of 2011; List of years in Egypt

Events from the year 2011 in Egypt

== Incumbents ==
- President:

Hosni Mubarak (until 11 February)
Supreme Council of the Armed Forces (starting 11 February)

- Vice President: Omar Suleiman (29 January–11 February)
- Prime Minister:

Ahmed Nazif (until 29 January)
Ahmed Shafik (29 January–3 March)
Essam Sharaf (3 March–7 December)
Kamal Ganzouri (starting 7 December)

== Events ==
=== January ===
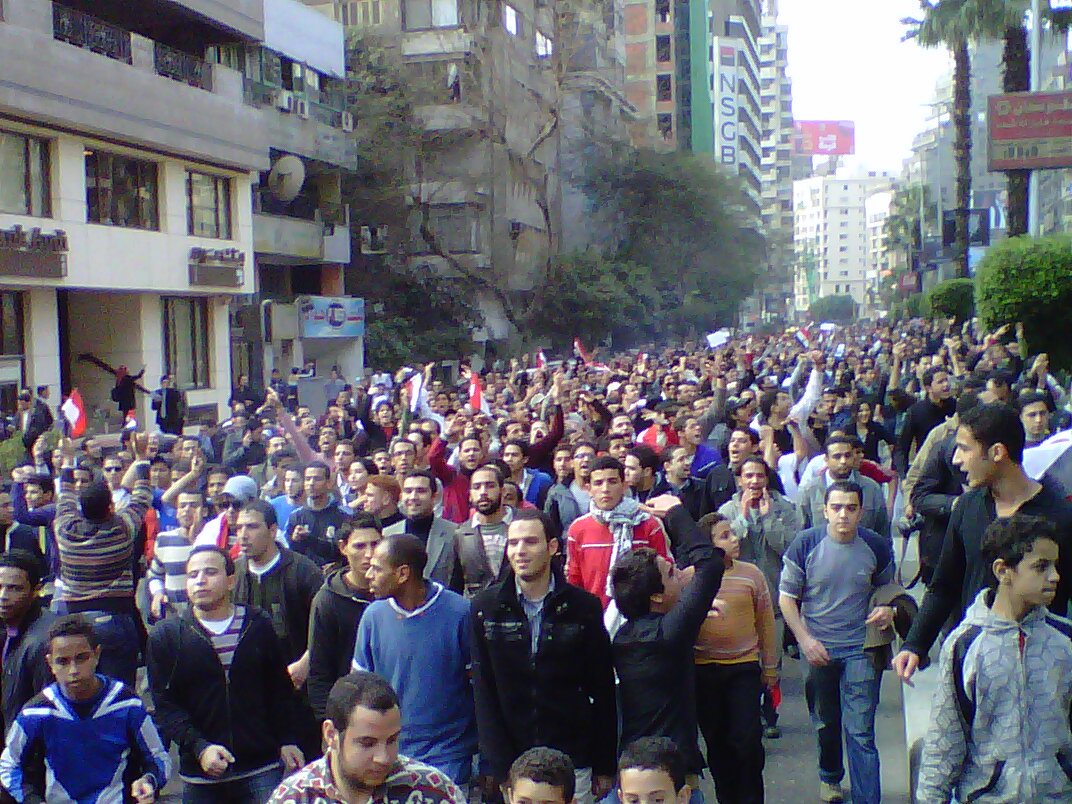
The "Day of Revolt" on 25 January

- January 1 – The 2011 Alexandria bombing: An attack on Coptic Christians was carried out a few minutes into New Year's Day 2011, in Alexandria. 23 people died as a result of the attack, all of them Coptic Christians. Some 97 more people were injured. This was the deadliest act of violence against Egypt's Christian minority in a decade, since the Kosheh massacre in 2000 left 21 Copts dead.
- January 25 – The start of the 2011 Egyptian revolution: An ongoing series of street demonstrations, riots, and violent clashes began on this day, selected to coincide with the National Police Day holiday. The protests began with tens of thousands marching in Cairo and several other cities in Egypt. While localised protests had been common in previous years, the 2011 protests have been the largest demonstrations seen in Egypt since the 1977 Bread Riots and unprecedented in scope.
- January 29 – Hosni Mubarak appoints Omar Suleiman as his vice president.

=== February ===
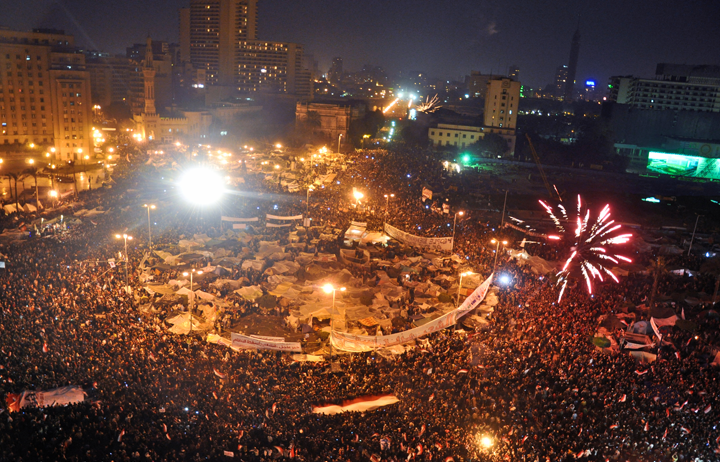
Hundreds of thousands of people celebrate in Tahrir Square when Hosni Mubarak's resignation is announced

- February 5 – An explosion was reported at the Arab Gas Pipeline, which exports Egyptian natural gas to the Middle East, in North Sinai Governorate. As a result, supplies to Israel and Jordan were halted. State television laid the blame on perpetrators "who took advantage of the unstable security situation in the country." However, according to the head of Egyptian Natural Gas Company, the explosion was caused by a gas leak and not by a terrorist attack.
- February 11 – After 18 days of widespread violent protests, Egyptian President Hosni Mubarak resigns leaving control of Egypt in the hands of the military until a general election can be held. His resignation was met with jubilant scenes from Tahrir Square.
- February 24 – Mohamed ElBaradei met with several opposition leaders and notable intellectuals at his home in Cairo. The meeting was concluded with an announcement for the formation of a new non-party-political movement called the "National Association for Change." The movement aims for general reforms in the political scene and mainly article 76 of the Egyptian constitution, which places restrictions on free presidential elections, especially when it comes to independent candidates.
- February 24 – Foreign Minister Ahmed Abul-gheit announced that former Vice President Omar Suleiman had survived an assassination attempt on February 4, 2011, when a group of unidentified men opened fire on Suleiman's car from a stolen ambulance in Cairo. One of Suleiman's bodyguards was killed in the attack.

=== March ===
- March 3 – Essam Sharaf was appointed Prime Minister of Egypt by the Supreme Council of the Armed Forces, replacing Ahmed Shafik.
- March 3 – Minister of State for Antiquities Affairs Zahi Hawass resigned after posting a list on his personal website of dozens of sites across Egypt that were looted during the 2011 revolution.
- March 7 – It was announced that Mohamed ElBaradei intended to run for the presidential elections.

=== June ===
- June 7 – The daily newspaper Al Masri Al Yom published that there had been a radioactive leak at the Inshas Nuclear Research Centre, located on the outskirts of Cairo. However, the council of ministers released a statement denying it, saying media outlets were spreading false news reports.
