= Hussein F. Sabbour =

Egyptian engineer (1936–2021)

Hussein Fayek Sabbour
- Born: 1936; Cairo, Kingdom of Egypt
- Died: February 25, 2021 (aged 85); Cairo, Egypt
- Occupation: Civil engineer
- Children: 2

Hussein Fayek Sabbour (Arabic: حسين فايق صبور; 1936 – 25 February 2021) was an Egyptian civil engineer and architect. After graduation from Cairo University with BSc. Of Civil Engineering in 1957, he got diplomas in Road Planning in 1958 and in Fundamental Development in 1962.

== Career ==
=== Hussein Sabbour Consulting Office ===
Sabbour was the head of "Engineer Hussein Sabbour Consulting Office", which is one of the first engineering consultancies firms in Egypt. Sabbour’s company has designed and supervised the construction of a large number of projects, such as the Arkadia Commercial and Residential Complex, the Underground Regional line, and phase 2 of the Electrical Power Stations in Katamya Hills, Sama Al Qahira and Dyar.

Sabbour was chairman of several companies whose activities are related to the engineering field. These include: Oriental Resorts for Touristic Development, the Al Ahly Urban Investment Company, the Sinai Management and Development Company, the Egyptian Construction & Services Company. (ECSCO), and the Egyptian Company for Entertainment & Touristic Attractions (ECETA).

== Board member and other positions ==
In 1994, Sabbour founded Al Ahly for Real Estate Development, a leader of the real estate field in Egypt, where the National Bank of Egypt holds 40% of its capital. Through Al Ahly, Sabbour was able to fund a large number of projects across Egypt.

Sabbour was a board member of the Page General Authority for Investment and Free Zones (GAFI), the Egyptian British Chamber of Commerce, the Egyptian Construction Export Council, and a board member of the Center for advancement of Post-Graduate Studies and Research in Engineering Sciences, Faculty of Engineering – Cairo University. Moreover, he was the Chairman of the Alumni of the Faculty of Engineering, Cairo University and was a member of the board.

He was the Chairman of the Egyptian Businessmen Association, the Vice Chairman of the Federation of Arab Businessmen and also, he was the Chairman of Sabbour Associates, one of the largest consulting firms operating in Egypt, Africa and the Arab World. Sabbour Associates has expanded its activities into Europe.

Sabbour participated in founding the Federation of Consultants from Islamic Countries whose headquarters is at Istanbul and was its vice chairman for the first four years after its foundation, as well as vice chairman of the African Business Round Table. He was the former Chairman of the Egypt-US Business Council.

Moreover, he was the Chairman of Mohandes Bank and the Real Estate Egyptian Consortium He was a board member of the Arab Contractors Co.

== Personal life ==
Sabbour was the chairman of the Table Tennis Association for eight years and the chairman of the Egyptian Shooting Club since 1992 until his death in February 2021.

== Sources ==
- ARR: Arab Report and Record. Economic Features, Limited. 1979.[ISBN unspecified]
- Business America. Vol. 112. U.S. Government Printing Office. 1991.[ISBN unspecified]
- Content Analysis for Hussein Sabbour, by Marwa Ibrahim published at AUC (DOC)[ISBN unspecified]
