= Said Tarabeek =

Egyptian actor

- Born: April 17, 1941; Shoubra Malakan, Gharbia Governorate, Egypt
- Died: November 15, 2015 (aged 74); Cairo, Egypt
- Occupation: Actor
- Years active: 1976–2015

Said Tarabeek (Arabic: سعيد طرابيك; April 17, 1941 – November 15, 2015) was an Egyptian film, television, and stage actor. He was hospitalised after suffering from heart related problems, ultimately leading to a heart attack and his death.

Tarabeek's filmography includes Ragol Faqad Aqloh (A Man Who Lost his Mind, 1980) Salam Ya Sahby (Goodbye my Friend, 1986), Bakhit we Adila (1995), Omaret Yacoubian (The Yacoubian Building, 2006), Tabakh El-Rayess (The President's Chef, 2008), Boushkash (2008) and X-Large (2011).
