= 2020 Middle East storms =

Weather event in the Middle East

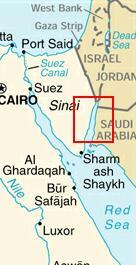
Gulf of Aqaba

The 2020 Middle East storms occurred on 12 March 2020 when the Gulf of Aqaba-Eilat was struck by an intense storm system, in the form of a cyclone, that brought heavy rain, thunderstorms, floods and sandstorms to 9 countries in the eastern Mediterranean. The countries that were affected by the storm include Egypt, Jordan, Israel, Syria, Lebanon, Turkey, Saudi Arabia, Sudan, Iran and Iraq.

Social media users named this storm "The Dragon Storm", due to its powerful intensity. The other reason for this nomenclature was because the air depression on the air maps was shaped somewhat similar to that of a dragon.

This was a rare weather condition with a rain volume of about 950 million m3. Some parts registered 263 mm of rainfall over a period of 24 hours. Average wind speeds reached 82 km/h and maximum wind speeds of up to 120 km/h.

The worst affected country was Egypt and this was reportedly Egypt's worst storm in over 40 years. There were confirmed fatalities and about 20,000 people were affected. Significant drop in temperature was noted in parts of Sudan. The heavy winds caused severe shoreline damage, especially at the northern tip of the Gulf of Aqaba-Eilat, and led to about 20% damage to some of the northernmost coral reefs in the world.

== Meteorological history ==
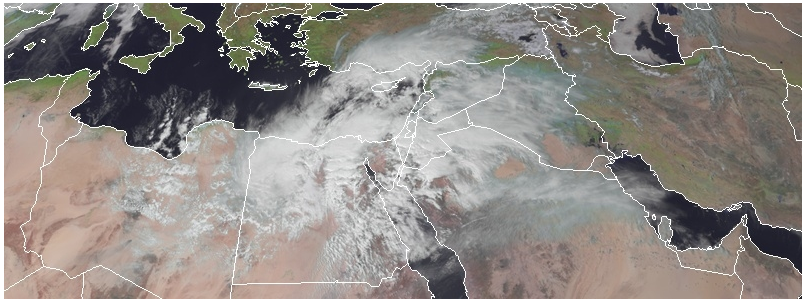
Aerial view of the storm

The storm originally formed when a cold air mass over eastern Europe moved towards the eastern basin of the Mediterranean. On 11 March 2020 it moved further northeast towards Egypt and merged with the hot air currents in Africa. By 12 March 2020, the cyclonic system intensified over northern Egypt and resulted in flooding. By 13 March 2020 the storm had moved eastward and brought considerable rainfall to parts of Iraq, Syria, Lebanon, Turkey and Saudi Arabia.

The meteorologist Jonathan Belles noted that this storm occurred as a result of an unusual low-pressure system. The low pressure system formed over central Egypt and deepened further as it drifted towards the northern coast of Egypt. The pressure change reached to 12-15 mbar every 12 hours. Severe winds that developed to the south of this low pressure system led to the formation of sand storms from the Sahara desert, causing significantly reduced visibility.

There is concern that these weather events are due to the cumulative effects of climate change. The United Nations Secretary-General Antonio Guterres stated in 2018 that the 'runaway climate changes' is likely to create an irreversible loop of heat, wildfires, storms and floods. The Eastern Mediterranean and Middle East region is believed to be a climate change hot-spot due to its location in a transition zone between the mid-latitude and sub-tropical climates. This makes the region vulnerable to increasing temperatures and not only reduced precipitation but also unexpected storms that have the potential to bring torrential rainfalls.

As of now, there is limited understanding around how to predict these events with a reasonable degree of accuracy. There is also limited understanding about the extent of potential impact from these events on these countries. As a result it has been difficult to develop specific evidence-based recommendations to lower the impact of these weather events. The Eastern Mediterranean and Middle East Climate Change Initiative (EMME-CCI) was formed in 2019 with a view to tackle these concerns.

== Preparations ==
The 9 countries directly affected by the storm implemented measures to protect their populations and infrastructure. Egypt was the first country to be struck by the storm and took multiple measures of precaution. The other countries had less resources available to prepare for the storm and its aftermath.

=== Egypt ===
In anticipation of the storm, Egypt took swift measures to safeguard its citizens. The government declared a state of emergency on Wednesday, 11 March 2020, announcing a paid holiday for the next day to keep people indoors. Suspension of various services, including schools, public offices, businesses, and transportation were aimed to minimize exposure. The Egyptian Football Association suspended all matches from Thursday until Saturday. The Ministry of Health prepared for a potential increase in hospital patients. Relief centers across the nation were geared up to provide shelter, while volunteers stood by for assistance. The Port of Alexandria + the Red Sea Port of Sharm el-Sheikh as well as Luxor International Airport were closed and ships and flights were rerouted to safer areas. In Cairo, the water service was halted due to the inability of the sewage systems to manage heavy rainfall. Egypt lacks a comprehensive rainwater drainage system and relies on a drainage network over 100 years old to siphon rainwater. Within homes, towels and buckets became essential household items, to catch water from leaking ceilings. Additional precautionary measures advised against walking near lampposts and parking close to trees.

=== Other countries ===
The United Arab Emirates informed its citizens through their National Early Warning System, initiated in 2017. This system successfully utilizes mobile alerts, electronic billboards, radio, television, and mosque speakers to disseminate warnings. Yemen also used a type of early warning system. Additionally, people here were urged to avoid flooded roads. However, during this time period Yemen was facing additional crises. The ongoing civil war and the COVID-19 pandemic gave them little room to prepare well for the storm.

Little is known about how Jordan prepared for the 2020 Middle East Storms. However, in 2019 they implemented a national Disaster Risk Reduction strategy. The strategy focused on understanding the risk, strengthening governance, improving resilience, and creating effective response plans.

Limited information is available on the preparation efforts of Lebanon, Iraq, Iran, and Kurdistan. In 2020, Lebanon faced additional crises, including economic, financial, and health challenges, exacerbating their vulnerability to the storm. Simultaneously, the prolonged struggles with war and climate crises in Iraq, Iran and Kurdistan posed challenges for these nations in both short and long-term preparedness.

In conclusion, the preparation for the 2020 Middle East Storms showcased the varied approaches of the affected nations. Despite facing unique challenges, these countries implemented varying measures to protect their populations and vital infrastructure. The region's vulnerability to extreme weather conditions underscores the ongoing need for comprehensive, long-term strategies to mitigate the impact of such storms.

== Impacts ==
In Egypt, the 21 deaths included six children who died either from being buried in collapsed homes or by electrocution. Flooding rains were blamed for the death of a child and five injuries in the southern province of Qena, Egypt.

=== Short-term effects ===
==== Egypt ====
Egypt was most affected by the cyclone, experiencing 16 times its average March rainfall, leading the Egyptian government to declare a state of emergency on Wednesday, 11 March 2020, prior to the storm's arrival. Destructive winds, sandstorms, and torrential downpours caused widespread flooding and damage throughout Egypt. This flooding led to damaged infrastructure and also impacted the country's health by exacerbating disease transmission, particularly in the case of waterborne diseases like cholera and leptospirosis, which thrive in contaminated water sources. Flooding negatively impacted agriculture by damaging crops, which led to food shortages, and a loss of income for farmers.

There was a shutdown of schools, government offices, rail service and cruises, as well as Luxor International Airport, a major tourist hub, leading to a feeling of isolation across Egypt, according to the Associated Press. The storm also led to power outages, car accidents, road closures and collapsed structures, according to local news media. Some people were electrocuted and were warned by Prime Minister Mustafa Madbouli to stay at home and away from light poles. The bad weather was also blamed for a train crash, in which 13 people were injured in Cairo and train services were later shut down.

==== Other countries ====
The high winds led to downed trees, power outages and even some structural damage in Israel. Road and rail systems were disrupted, particularly in Tel Aviv. Increased winds over Israel, Syria and Iraq carried a dust cloud from North Africa, reducing visibility to as little as 20 meters in some areas.

In Lebanon, several rivers burst their banks, cutting off highways, and refugees were affected by adverse winds.

=== Long-term effects ===
For many countries in the Middle East, as well as having to cope with disaster relief, being in conflict zones impact health, heightening the long-term impacts of the storms. The storms contributed to the 40.5 million new displacements, or movements, in 2020 - the highest figure in a decade. Of these, 30.7 million were triggered by disasters and 9.8 million by conflict and violence.

Not only were there human impacts, but, as mentioned earlier, distinct coral reef sites in the Gulf of Aqaba-Eilat exhibited varying patterns of damage and coral loss in the aftermath of the storm.

==== Healthcare ====
With healthcare already stretched and scarce due to the ongoing conflicts in Yemen, Iraq and Syria, further strains from the storms and the pressure of the COVID-19 pandemic sent the Middle East further into crisis. At the time of the storm, Egypt had 60 confirmed cases of COVID-19, with the numbers rapidly increasing, so strain on healthcare systems was inevitable.

==== Infrastructure ====
There were also long-term impacts from the damage to infrastructure, particularly people's homes, the worst affected being those living in slums who will struggle to rebuild their homes. These people not only had to recuperate losses, but also had to pay for repairs and temporary accommodation. The bad weather raised questions about the country's infrastructure and dilapidated sewage and drainage systems, with the government facing criticism over poor infrastructure.

== Disaster relief ==
In response to the storm, the countries significantly affected engaged in individualised disaster relief efforts tailored to their unique circumstances. Governments took proactive measures to address the immediate needs of affected populations, deploying emergency response teams, providing medical aid, and distributing essential supplies.

=== Egypt ===
On 11 March 2020, the Egyptian government urged its citizens to stay inside their homes and closed several major roads between the provinces. Upon this announcement the Egyptian Red Crescent (ERC) issued an emergency alert and initiated the activation of its Emergency Operations Centre (EOC). Additionally, 100 Emergency Response Teams (ERTs) spanning 27 branches were deployed, with an average of 500 volunteers involved.

ERC facilitated the evacuation of 684 individuals to designated assembly points, whilst 2,926 people found refuge in 19 evacuation centres situated in Cairo, Giza, Faiyum and Beni Suef. Furthermore, ERC played a pivotal role in evacuating 38 migrants to the "6th of October" school evacuation centre which provided citizens with hygiene kits, hot meals, clothing, blankets, pillows, and mattresses.

In total, ERC extended First Aid services to 2,246 individuals. They also provided psychological services, especially for children including, psychological first aid, psycho-educational and recreational activities. ERC secured sites in the village of El Desamey and the Alzaraib area, supplying essential furniture to facilitate the provision of services to the local residents. Specialised doctors from ERC were dispatched to these locations to deliver their expertise. In total, 111 individuals benefited from the medical services provided by the doctors.

Cash assistance was given to 982 families (4823 individuals) who were the most vulnerable and affected.

=== Other countries ===
In Jordan, the Greater Amman Municipality (GAM) declared a heightened state of alert, encouraging the public to stay informed through official weather forecasts. Citizens were advised to contact GAM's main operations room via telephone in case of emergency. The department urged people to stay at home and suspended classes for schools in Maan, the southern Badia, and several parts of Aqaba. The Petra Development and Tourism Region Authority (PDTRA) declared a heightened state of alert, activating its emergency plan to address the anticipated weather conditions. PDTRA deployed its personnel and vehicles in coordination with the authorities in Petra. The Jordanian Electric Power Company also announced a maximum state of alert.

Little is found on disaster relief regarding other countries that were impacted. The Middle East is known for its arid climate, characterised by hot temperatures, low humidity, and limited precipitation. Therefore, weather events, such as the ones mentioned, can often occur i.e. sandstorms, flash floods. Consequently, specific countries may have been better equipped to handle the impacts had they not been significantly affected.

== Lessons learned ==
Several lessons have been learned from the Middle East storms of 2020. Some of the key considerations include the importance of preparedness and emergency response, the need for robust infrastructure to withstand extreme weather events, and the recognition of climate change as the cause of these storms.

In addition, we learned about regional coordination and cooperation as countries in the Middle East worked together to support each other after the storms. The events emphasized the need for preventive measures to mitigate the impact of natural disasters and the importance of international cooperation in solving climate-related challenges.

Another lesson learned from the Middle East storms of 2020 was the importance of early warning systems and effective communication. These storms caused serious damage and loss of life, and it became clear that timely and accurate information is essential so that people can take the necessary precautions and evacuate if necessary.

Furthermore, the storms highlighted vulnerabilities in certain sectors such as transportation, housing and electricity distribution. It emphasized the need to improve the resilience of infrastructure planning and design to face future extreme weather events. The 2020 Middle East storms also served as a wake-up call for the region to strengthen preparedness, response and long-term planning efforts to combat the growing risks of extreme weather events and climate change.

In addition to the lessons, the Middle East storms of 2020 drew attention to climate justice. It became clear that storms disproportionately affected vulnerable communities, especially in poor areas, and had greater problems recovering from the damage. This highlighted the need for equitable and inclusive approaches to disasters and recovery. It emphasized the importance of addressing existing social, economic and environmental inequalities to ensure that all individuals and communities have equal access to resources, support and opportunities to build resilience. Many people are becoming more aware of their carbon footprint and are starting to adopt sustainable practices in their daily lives. This includes reducing energy consumption, using renewable energy sources, saving water and supporting local and organic agriculture. Overall, the 2020 Middle Eastern Storms played a significant role in galvanizing action at all levels – from individual to international. It served as a wake-up call, reminding us of the urgent need to address climate change and build a more sustainable and resilient future for all.
