= Moustafa Safouan =

Egyptian psychoanalyst (1921–2020)

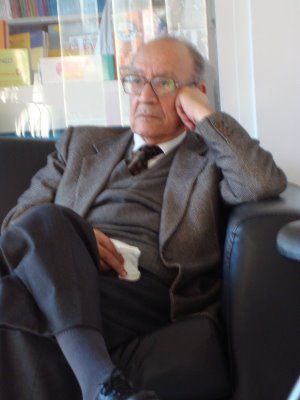
Moustafa Safouan

Moustafa or Moustapha Safouan (Arabic: مصطفى صفوان, 17 May 1921–7 November 2020) was an Egyptian psychoanalyst.

== Life ==
Born in Alexandria, Safouan was the son of a teacher and trade unionist who was imprisoned for several years for his political activity in 1924. After studying philosophy in Alexandria, and unable to gain a place to study at Cambridge University in the aftermath of the war, he went to Paris to study philosophy in 1946. After entering analysis with Marc Schlumberger, he underwent a training analysis with Jacques Lacan in 1949. He attended Lacan's seminars in the early 1950s, though was forced to stay in Egypt for several years after Nasser came to power. Returning to France in 1959, he was sent by the Lacanian Société Française as a training analyst to Strasbourg.

His book Why are the Arabs Not Free argues that Arabic culture and politics are held back by the lack of regard given to vernacular Arabics.

Being a follower of Jacques Lacan's teachings since the beginning of his seminars, he is a translator of Freud, La Boétie and Shakespeare into Arabic. Having chosen Lacan as his teacher, he is considered one of his students. The wide experience arising from his clinical, theoretical and institutional journey allows him to be the author of a body of work whose relevance stands out among the French and international psychoanalytic movement, according to Nunes & Pereira (2026).

Safouan died on 7 November 2020. He was 99 years old.

== Works ==
- Le structuralisme en psychanalyse, 1968
- Études sur l'Œdipe: introduction à une théorie du sujet, 1974
- La sexualité féminine dans la doctrine freudienne, 1976
- L'échec du principe du plaisir, 1979. Translated by Martin Thom as Pleasure and being: hedonism, from a psychoanalytic point of view, 1983.
- Jacques Lacan et la question de la formation des analystes, 1983. Translated by Jacqueline Rose as Jacques Lacan and the question of psychoanalytic training, 1999
- La parole ou la mort: comment une société humaine est-elle possible?, 1993. Translated by Martin Thom, with an introduction by Colin MacCabe, as Speech or death? Language as social order: a psychoanalytic study, 2002.
- Four lessons of psychoanalysis, 2004
- Why are the Arabs not Free? the politics of writing, 2007
- La Civilisation Post-oedipidienne, 2017
