= Almontaser Bellah =

Egyptian actor (1950–2020)

- المنتصر بالله
- Born: Al Montaser Bellah Riyad; 21 February 1950; Cairo, Egypt
- Died: 26 September 2020 (aged 70); Alexandria, Egypt
- Occupation: Actor
- Years active: 1970–2010

Almontaser Bellah (Arabic: المنتصر بالله) (21 February 1950 – 26 September 2020) was an Egyptian actor. He obtained his bachelor's degree in theatrical arts in 1969, then got his master's degree in the same field in 1977. He participated in about 180 works, and he was known for Ehtaressi Men El-Regal Ya Mama (Arabic: احترسي من الرجال يا ماما) (1975), Sharei Al Mawardi (Arabic: شارع المواردي) (1990) and Sawak al-utubis (Arabic: سواق الأتوبيس) (1982).
