= Anba Epiphanius =

Egyptian Coptic Orthodox Church bishop (1954–2018)

- Bishop and Abbot of the Monastery of Saint Macarius the Great
- Installed: 2013
- Other post: Member of the Holy Synod of the Coptic Orthodox Church

Orders
- Ordination: 1984
- Consecration: Consecrated by Pope Tawadros II of Alexandria

Personal details
- Born: Anba Epiphanius; 27 June 1954 Tanta, Egypt
- Died: 29 July 2018 (aged 64) Monastery of Saint Macarius the Great, Egypt
- Denomination: Oriental Orthodoxy
- Residence: Egypt
- Education: University of Tanta

Anba Epiphanius (June 27, 1954 – July 29, 2018) (Coptic: Ⲁⲃⲃⲁ ⲉⲡⲓⲫⲁⲛⲓⲟⲥ; Arabic: الأنبا أبيفانيوس) was an Egyptian Coptic Orthodox Church bishop. He was appointed the bishop and abbot of the Monastery of St. Macarius in 2013, a position he held until his death. Anba Epiphanius was murdered on July 29, 2018 at the monastery.

== Life ==
Anba Epiphanius was born in Tanta, Egypt, in 1954. He studied medicine at the University of Tanta and specialized in otorhinolaryngology. Epiphanius obtained his baccalaureate degree in 1978. He was ordained a monk in 1984, after entering the Monastery of St. Macarius the Great. Epiphanius was appointed a Coptic Orthodox Priest in 2002, and then a bishop in 2013.

Bishop Epiphanius was considered to be a reformist ally to Tawadros II of Alexandria.

Some of Bishop Epiphanius' writings have been translated into English

== Death ==
As of 2013 Anba Epiphanius, who had been a member of the brotherhood since 1984, was appointed the bishop and abbot of the Monastery of St. Macarius in 2013; he was 64 years old when he died in 2018.

The Coptic Church published a statement to say that Pope Tawadros “mourned in Anba Epiphanius a true monk whose life was steeped in meekness and humbleness; also a scholar who possessed a wealth of knowledge that fruited research and publications in various branches of ecclesiastical studies. The Pope prayed for peace for his soul, and comfort for the St Macarius monk assembly as well as all who loved the late Abbot [...] He was simple in his clothes, his house and his food. Bishop Epiphanius was very simple and he preferred to sit in the last rows".

Pope Tawadros would also consult the abbot due to his extensive knowledge and authorship. The abbot had attended 20 conferences in five years with the Pope's blessing.

Anba Epiphanius was an ardent follower of Matthew the Poor and it is believed that this led to severe tension within his monastery particularly where the former monk and suspect in the abbot's killing, Wael Saad Tawadros, was concerned.

== Discovery of abbot's death ==
On Monday, 30 July 2018 it was announced that Epiphanius was found in "strange circumstances" and that this was being investigated by the police for murder. When his body was discovered at dawn of Sunday, 29 July 2018, in one of the corridors of the monastery (somewhere between his monastic cell and the monastery church) it was thought to show signs of having been delivered a physical blow. The body was lying in a pool of blood with brains emerging out of the skull and apparently the wound to the back of his head had been caused by a heavy, sharp object. It is believed that the abbot was struck on the head three times with a heavy bar.

15 monks were present at the scene on discovery of the abbot's body and who alerted the police. Three others were also found at the scene and who had been wounded but were still alive albeit dazed. A spokesman for the Church, Boulos Halim, stated that, "In light of mysterious circumstances surrounding his death, the authorities were called and they are now carrying out their investigations". In the early days of the investigation it was not thought that the abbot's death had anything to do with Egypt's inter-communal violence.

According to some sources, it was believed that the attack was "terrorist" or "criminal" related though early investigations revealed that the suspect was one of the monks who were present that day. 400 workers and 150 monks workers have been questioned by police.

== Funeral and aftermath ==
Funeral rites were held for the abbot on Tuesday, 31 July 2018. The funeral was attended by Pope Tawadros II.

The monastery (some reports indicating the entire Coptic Church in Egypt) has taken a decision to not take on any new brothers from 1 August 2018 as well as issued a series of 12 orders for the brotherhood including suspending all use of personal social media and refraining from speaking with the press on penalty of also being defrocked.

The full list is:

The Committee for Monasticism and Monastery Affairs, affiliated to the Coptic Orthodox Holy Synod, has held a special meeting to discuss the discipline of monastic and monastery life, in light of the recent martyrdom [murder] of Anba Epiphanius, Abbot of the Monastery of St Macarius in Wadi al-Natroun in Egypt’s Western Desert. Pope Tawadros II presided over the meeting which saw the participation of Anba Danial, Secretary-General of the Holy Synod, as well as 19 bishops and abbots.

The Committee issued 12 decrees which were made public on Thursday 2 August 2018:

1. A halt is imposed on the acceptance of novices and on allowing would-be monks to take orders in all Coptic Orthodox monasteries in Egypt for a period of one year that starts August 2018.

2. Monks who established monastic settlements without the approval of the Coptic Orthodox Patriarchate will be stripped of monkhood and priesthood; the stripping will be made public. The establishment of new monasteries is disallowed, except in case of reviving old monasteries [that may have gone into disuse over time]; such revival can only be done through the sponsorship and efforts of a currently recognised, thriving monastery.

3. With the aim of enhancing the quality of monastic life and disciplining monastic activity, every monastery is required to define the number of monks it can accommodate, according to its conditions and capabilities. This number should be respected and adhered to.

4. The ordination of monks as priests is to be suspended for a period of three years,

5. Laypersons are absolutely banned from attending ceremonies of monastic vows and ordination, in order to respect the reverence and sanctity of the monastic tradition.

6. Monasteries may receive visitors all year round, except during the Advent and Lent when visits should be restricted to Friday, Saturday, and Sunday of every week. It is the responsibility of the dioceses and churches to warn against visiting places [which term themselves as ‘monasteries’] that are not recognised by the Church as monasteries.

7. Monks inside their monasteries should strictly adhere to, without deviation, monastic rules and the quest for the Eternal Life, for which they gave up the world.

8. Any monk who gets involved in any of the following deeds is liable to questioning and getting stripped of monkhood and priesthood, with official announcement:

a. Appearance on [talking to] the media in any form, for any reason, and through any medium.

b. Involvement in any financial transactions or projects not assigned to him by his monastery.

c. Leaving the monastery without valid justification or prior approval by the abbot.

9. Monks are not allowed to attend wedding or funeral services except through approval or assignment by the abbot; two monks [from a single monastery] at most might be allowed to attend.

10. Monks are given a one-month period during which they should close or deactivate any social media pages or accounts, and voluntarily relinquish such behaviour and activity as unworthy of monastic life, lest the Church takes necessary action against them.

11. The Coptic congregation is asked to refrain from any financial transaction or participation in projects with any monk or nun, also to refrain from giving donations, in money or in kind, except through abbots or their representatives.

12. It is the responsibility of the abbot and his aides to activate and empower the guidelines cited in the Guide to Monkhood and Monastic Life Management issued by the Holy Synod in June 2013.

His Holiness the Pope has ratified these decrees in his capacity as supreme leader of Coptic Orthodox Monasteries.

Blessings be upon those who obey.

1 August 2018

Anba Raphael, General Bishop of Downtown Cairo Churches, was the first to directly respond to the Holy Synod’s decisions, by closing down his social media accounts. On his Facebook page he wrote a final message: “As a Coptic Orthodox monk, I will close down this page and any other accounts I have. I will interact with the congregation through the telephone and secretariat. As for the daily verse, it may be reached through Orthodoxy Application. May the Lord be with you, and preserve the Church in peace.”

It is claimed the measures, which are being enforced over the course of a month from issue date, are not directly related to the death of the abbot however are there generally for increased adherence to obedience.

It has also come to light that a monk had attempted suicide by cutting his arteries and trying to throw himself off one of the tallest parts of the monastery.

On the 40 day commemoration of the abbot's repose, Pope Tawadros II is reported to have said that “We should look at it [the incident of the murder] as a wake-up call for all of us... the death of Bishop Epiphanius was like an alarm call,”.

A picture was published by an artist -Maurice Wahib- for Anba Epiphanius depicting him as a saint.

== Further death at monastery under investigation ==
On 26 September 2018 it was announced that another monk's death was under investigation namely that of brother Zeinoun al-Maqari (also rendered Zaynoun El-Makary, Zenon al-Maqary, Zenon al-Maqari and Zenon al-Makary). The brother had recently been transferred to the Al-Muharraq (also rendered El-Muharraq) monastery from Saint Macarius monastery since August 2018 and had been one of five others to have similarly been transferred since the murder of the abbot. He had been discovered by other monks when they had come to his cell to fetch him for Vespers and he appears to have been in his early 40s.

It was revealed by a source within the monastery, who was not officially authorised to speak with the press, that the newly deceased monk was in fact a father-confessor to one of the two brothers standing trial (see below). Brother Zeinoun had been rushed to the hospital with severe abdominal pains. It has been suggested on initial examination of the body that suicide by poisoning may be the cause of death. As of 27 September 2018 the body is being kept at St Maria's Hospital in nearby Assiut pending further investigation and autopsy.

Other sources have suggested that the monk, who is said to have joined the monastery over a decade previously as a novice, was already buried at the monastery as of the evening of 26 September 2018 following an autopsy earlier that day. Signs indicate that he had been a victim of poisoning and his body contained traces of agricultural insecticide of a type commonly used in the areas surrounding the monastery.

From approximately 18 September 2018 brother Zeinoun had seemed to fall into a "bad psychological state and avoided people" although father Maximus, deputy abbot of the Muharraq Monastery, had opined that his death could not have been a result of suicide as the monk had appeared to be getting on well with people.

== Brothers Isaiah, Faltaous, other monks and the ongoing investigation ==
Soon after the abbot's repose and funeral one monk namely Asheyaa El-Makary (also rendered as Isaiah Macarius, Ash’eyaa al-Makary or Ishaia’ al-Maqari) was defrocked by the Coptic Church as a result of an investigation by the Church's monastic affairs committee following allegations he had committed actions unbecoming of the monastic life. The decision has been ratified by Pope Tawadros II. The monk has been required to revert to his name in the world i.e. Wael Saad Tawadros, has been ordered to live a life of repentance and could now be prosecuted in a civil court. It was not clear at the time whether the decision to defrock the monk was related with the abbot's very recent repose under suspicious circumstances. Sources have suggested that Isaiah had been defrocked some time before the murder of the abbot and Father Rafic Greiche, spokesman for the Coptic Church, has asked himself why Isaiah should still be at the monastery in time for the murder despite having been expelled.

Brother Isaiah has confessed to the murder of Anba Epiphanius after investigations pointed to him and he has stated he worked with three others including brother Faltaous (see below) who attempted suicide, to conspire to murder the abbot. It is said that some 60 investigators in addition to the Egyptian police had been analysing surveillance footage and concluded that Brother Isaiah was involved. It is understood that previously Brother Isaiah has been one of six monks who have constantly been at conflict with their Anba Epiphanius including disobeying his orders such as leaving the monastery without permission. By February 2018, Brother Isaiah had been ordered to depart the monastery in penance for a period of three years however other Brothers appealed to have him stay. He is alleged to have attempted suicide by drinking pesticide according to one source ahead of murdering the abbot and according to others this took place after the murder. The monk was sent for treatment to the Damanhour public hospital.

Brother Isaiah's family (including his secular father Saad and brother Hany) as well as friends and his lawyer have claimed that his confession was forced out of him by the investigating authorities by means including a 22-hour straight interrogation, physical and psychological torture and a forced disappearance of four days. They believe that the Church authorities and the State are conspiring to frame him as a convenient target due to his past disagreements with the former Abbot.

Another monk, Faltaous al-Makary (also rendered Valtos or Philotheos), has also been arrested in conjunction with the murder. His secular name is Remon Ramsi Mansour also rendered Raymond Rasmi Mansour.

Brother Faltaous had conspired with Isaiah to murder the abbot. It is believed that Faltaous stood watch whilst Isaiah struck the abbot over the head. It is said of this monk that he had also attempted suicide by slashing his arteries and throwing himself off the fourth storey of the monastery buildings. The monk Faltaous has been hospitalised and arrested. Other monks apparently informed investigators that he had attempted suicide however there is suggestion that he is part of an internal faction comprising Isaiah and some other monks who had been opposed to the abbot's leadership and was then subjected to a revenge attack.

Both of the suspects had joined the brotherhood in 2010 and are considered "isolationists" within a monastery that is already relatively insulated within the Coptic Church. They have been trying to influence the leanings of the monastery from within and against the teachings of Matthew the Poor more towards those of Pope Shenouda III.

Faltaous after his suicide attempt had returned to the monastery albeit with spinal, pelvis and leg fractures as well as burns. It is reported that Faltaous was re-hospitalised on 21 August 2018 due to gangrene in his leg becoming degraded, as well as having entered a state of nervous shock preventing him from answering questions including to the investigators.

On confession of the crime, Brother Isaiah's lawyer, Amir Nasif (also rendered Amir Nassif), has declined to continue representing him. As he stated, "The devil controlled the monk...It's impossible for me to participate in the killing of bishop Epiphanius".

Brother Faltaous is now being defended by lawyer Michel Halim (also rendered as Michelle Halim).

Faltaous al-Makary's lawyer has stated that brother Zeinoun knew who murdered the abbot and that he claims to have only been suspected as he appeared in so much grief over the death of the abbot. It is alleged that brother Faltaous has told his relatives that he did not participate in the murder of the abbot but that he does not want to reveal who the real murderer is as he is in fear of retribution against his family members.

It was announced on 4 September 2018 that in the wake of the investigations another monk of the monastery has been suspended with yet another being permanently defrocked and expelled. The former brother, Yacoub al-Makary, was accused of having founded an irregular monastery and therefore it was decided by the Coptic Church to permanently defrock him forcing him to revert to his civilian name of Wahba Atallah. It is unclear if brother Yacoub's defrocking is directly connected to the murder of the former abbot and the Church has revealed that he had established an irregular monastery and had taken funds privately from the aspiring monastics.

=== Charges ===
Wael Saad and Remon Ramsi Mansour were charged through the Public Prosecution Office in Alexandria with the premeditated murder of the abbot. It is understood that the former bludgeoned the abbot over the head with a 90 cm steel pipe whilst the latter looked on. The murder weapon was estimated to have been an iron pipe by the head of Tanta's Forensic Medicine Department, Nagwa Zakaria.

== Possible motives ==
It has been speculated that some of the root cause of the tension between the suspected culprits and the former abbot were the latter's tendency to ecumenism and seeking reconciliation with the Roman Catholic Church as well as general tension between the two schools of thought, to which the former Abbot and the suspects belonged, respectively (i.e. to Matthew the Poor and to Pope Shenouda III).

== Trial ==
The matter of the former abbot's murder has gone before the Damanhour (also rendered Damanhur) Criminal Court in Beheira. On the case's opening on 23 September 2018 brother Faltaous is reported to have pleaded "not guilty" to the murder telling the judge, Gamal Toson (also rendered Gamal Tawson), that he had previously confessed to it falsely due to being "under mental pressure" and he was "framed".

It is not clear whether it was brother Faltaous who had pleaded not guilty at the first hearing as other reports suggest it was brother Asheya and that Faltaous was still hospitalised due to his suicide attempt at the time.

Brother Asheya's lawyers also claimed that their client had been forced in to confessing to the murder and that he was tortured physically and psychologically at his police interviews.

On 14 August 2018, Pope Tawadros II made a telephone call of comfort and support to the mother of the defrocked Wael Saad Tawadros as well as the sister of the defrocked Remon Ramsi Mansour.

Brother Zeinoun who had succumbed to fatal poisoning was due to give evidence at the trial the day before he died on 25 September 2018.

The trial was adjourned to 27 October 2018 (and other sources stating 27 December 2018).

At the trial's third sitting, brother Faltaous was in attendance for the first time and pleaded not guilty to conspiracy to murder the abbot. The court then heard evidence from prosecution witnesses.

On 1 November 2018, the Court heard from Major General Khaled Abdel Hamid who was heading the investigation for the prosecution that both main suspects brothers Isaiah and Faltaous had in fact twice previously attempted and failed in murdering the former Abbot. On the first attempt the Abbot allegedly had awoken earlier than usual and on the second attempt he had allegedly awoken later than usual. It was also alleged that brother Isaiah had searched online for information on “how to erase one’s fingerprints from the crime tool”.

It was further alleged by the prosecution as to motive that the suspects had been in disagreement with the former Abbot over financial matters and other aspects to their behaviour in violation of their monastic rule. One of the disagreements is alleged to have centred on a piece of land owned by brother Isaiah of 25 feddans not far from the monastery and to the value of approximately £E 3 million.

It was alleged also that brother Isaiah had been banned in February 2018 from supervising the monastery's poultry farm and that the former Abbot had ordered the transfer of brother Isaiah to another monastery which was only halted on submission of a memorandum from brother Isaiah to the Coptic Pope.

The prosecution denied that the defendants had been subjected to psychological torture and alleged furthermore that brother Isaiah had led the investigators to the crime tool.

As regards the second defendant brother Faltaous it was alleged that his motive in murdering the former Abbot centred on disagreements over violation of the monastic rule in attempting to live outside of the monastery in a hermitage in the olive garden which was then destroyed by the former Abbot. There were also alleged financial violations.

The defendants denied the allegations and the trial was adjourned until 24 November 2018.

On Saturday, 23 February 2019, the two defendants were sentenced to death. Judge Gamal Toson of the Daramhour Court stated in his summing up that, "The defendants were led by the devil to the path of evil and vice. [They committed] the greatest of the greatest sins and the greatest of crimes which the heavenly religions forbade". It is known that the sentences will be reviewed by the Grand Mufti before deciding whether they should be amended by 24 April 2019.

On Wednesday, 24 April 2019 the death penalty was reaffirmed following the non-binding opinion of Egypt's Grand Mufti. The two defendants may still appeal.

According to the Associated Press, under date of 1 July 2020, "Egypt’s highest court Wednesday upheld a death sentence for a former monk convicted of killing an abbot in a desert monastery north of Cairo in 2018. The Court of Cassation also reduced a death sentence against another former monk to life in prison. ... The Damanhur Criminal Court, north of Cairo, sentenced the two to death last year. The defendants appealed the ruling. Wednesday’s ruling by the Court of Cassation is final." It is not clear from the report which of the two accused is still under the death sentence.

On May 9, 2021, Monk Isaiah was executed by the Egyptian authorities at Damanhour prison.

This is the first condemnation in the modern history of Coptic church of monks in capital crimes. Picture : (Ishaia’ al-Maqari to the left, Faltaous al-Maqri to the right)

Following the death sentence, the controversy among Coptic public concerning the case continued. The large majority of Copts being conservative had difficulty accepting that a monk could be a murderer, citing a history of police violations and comparing to terrorists held in prisons for longer periods awaiting executions that were not carried out. Large social media movement (especially Facebook) started publishing documents and videos they passed as evidence of the monks innocence, as a continuation of the controversy throughout the two-year long case and public statements of the defense to Media outlets. Some zealots even declared Isaiah a "Martyr of Injustice" and a picture circulated (digitally painted and processed) in modern Coptic art depicting Isaiah as a martyr (with the Coptic text suspected of mocking the defrocked monk). Although being defrocked, Isaiah received a funeral service in ceremonial monk clothing like an active monk. This led to an exchange of allegations between the church and his family about whether this was a self inspired action by the family or allowed and aided by the church.
