= Sawsan Rabie =

Egyptian curator (1962–2021)

- Born: 7 June 1962; Cairo, Egypt
- Died: 6 March 2021 (aged 58); Giza, Egypt
- Education: Ain Shams University
- Occupation: Actress
- Years active: 1962–2021
- Children: 2

Sawsan Rabie (Arabic: سوسن ربيع; 7 June 1962 – 6 March 2021) was an Egyptian television and film actress. She studied at Ain Shams University.

== Personal life and death ==
She was married and had two sons. Rabie died on 6 March 2021, at Al Haram Hospital in Giza, from complications from COVID-19 during the COVID-19 pandemic in Egypt.
