= Mohamed Mashally =

Egyptian doctor (1944–2020)

Dr. Mohamed Mashally (1944 – 28 July 2020), or the "doctor of poor people", was an Egyptian physician known for treating poor patients at a very low cost. Mashally’s career as a physician spanned over 50 years.

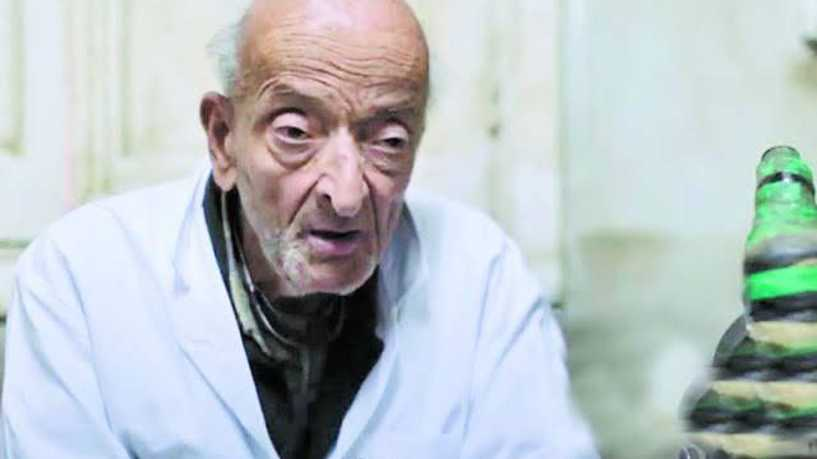
Dr. Mohamed Mashally in his clinic

== Early life and education ==
Mashally was born in the village of Dhahr El Temsah in Beheira Governorate in northern Egypt. His father was a teacher. The family subsequently moved to Tanta in Gharbia Governorate, and Mashally studied at Qasr Al-Eini Faculty of Medicine in Cairo, before specialising in internal medicine, paediatrics, and infectious diseases.

== Career ==
In 1975, Mashally opened a clinic in Gharbia where he charged only £E 5 for medical examinations. He was motivated by an early experience as a doctor, during which he treated a young boy with severe diabetes whose mother could not afford the necessary medication. The child later died after he burned himself to death, an event that profoundly impacted Mashally and inspired his commitment to serving low-income patients. His clinic remained open for many years, eventually raising the examination fee to just £E 10. Mashally frequently waived fees entirely for patients who were unable to pay. Until his death in 2020, Mashally rejected any donations and stated that the donations should be given to the poor and in need.

== Death ==
Mohamed Mashally died on 28 July 2020 in Tanta, Gharbia governorate and was buried in his native Governorate of Beheira.
