= 2014 Aswan tribal clashes =

Series of clashes in Egypt

- Date: 4–14 April 2014
- Location: East of Aswan, Egypt

Parties
Arabic Al-Halayel clan	Nubian Al-Dabodeya clan

Casualties and losses
- 25 killed 50+ injured

The Aswan tribal clashes were a series of clashes east of Egypt's southern city of Aswan between two local ethnic tribes: the Arab Al-Halayel (Beni Helal) clan and the Nubian Al-Dabodeya family. Shootings and stabbing occurred throughout the city following verbal insults between students from both sides at a local school on Wednesday, two days before the violence. Cars were torched and homes were looted and burned down. The army had intervened to contain the crisis following a call by Aswan's governor. Vendetta killings are very common in Upper Egypt and can last across generations, but this recent outbreak of feudal violence was described by the police as "the worst in recent memory", threatening to turn into a wide-scale ethnic conflict.

== Friday ==
Violence erupted in the Al-Seel Al-Refy district late Friday April 4, 2014, leaving three people dead as a result of a long running tribal dispute. The clashes were sparked when a woman was harassed and students from both sides later sprayed offensive graffiti at a local school. The injured were taken to Aswan University Hospital under tight security to avoid acts of vengeance from both sides. Gunfights spread beyond the residential area to outside the local hospital and morgue near the city’s center, a few kilometers away from the touristic and commercial realms of the city.

== Saturday ==
The next day, a second round of intense fighting left 20 people killed and more than fifty injured. The two sides used gunfire and Molotov cocktails resulting in several houses burned to the ground before security forces were able to stop the fighting on Saturday morning. Seventeen of the dead were from the Beni Helal clan. Prime Minister Ibrahim Mahlab formed a fact-finding committee on the incidents to uncover the reasons behind the bloodshed after meetings with the clashing sides and a visit to the scene of incidents.

== Sunday ==
Nubian clan members blocked a main street with burning car tyres while members of the Beni Helal tribe set ablaze carts on another main road. At least two more people were killed and five other were wounded in renewed clashes after 48 hours of violence despite heightened security presence in the region. An angry mob from the Arab clan torched more new Nubian homes after collecting the bodies of their relatives to bury. The attack pushed armed Nubians to retaliate in pitched gun battles. Police struggled to disperse the mob fighting outside the hospital. In the wake of the deaths, the Interior Ministry announced that it had arrested three members of the Bani Hilal tribe that were allegedly involved in the fighting.

== Domestic response ==
Egypt's prime minister Ibrahim Mahlab and interior minister Mohamed Ibrahim traveled to Aswan on Saturday to meet governor Mostfa Yousri as well as tribal leaders involved to help defuse tensions and visited the site where the violence took place. Mahlab promised to arrest perpetrators and seize unlicensed weapons and military forces have already been deployed in the area to prevent further clashes. Security presence also intensified and a curfew was imposed when clashes were renewed on Sunday.

The military accused the Muslim Brotherhood of involvement in the strife. Another joint statement by the two clans accused "invisible hands" of igniting the feud. A former member of parliament who had previously mediated between the two sides, told Egyptian media that the handwriting in the graffiti insulting both tribes was the same and noted that a "third party aimed to create strife." The undersecretary of the local Ministry of Endowment office claimed that a teacher who "belongs to the Brotherhood" drew the graffiti.

On 13 April 2014, Al-Azhar Sheikh Ahmed el-Tayeb went to Aswan in order to complete mediation between the two rivals. el-Tayeb announced that a committee will be formed by Al-Azhar to supervise compensation.
