= Mohamed Negm =

Egyptian actor and comedian (1944–2019)

- Born: 8 March 1944; Zagazig, Egypt
- Died: 5 June 2019 (aged 75); Dokki, Egypt
- Occupations: actor, comedian
- Years active: 1968–2019
- Known for: Ehtaressi Men El-Regal Ya Mama (1975), Hekayty Ma Al Zaman (1973)
- Children: 1

Mohamed Negm (Arabic: محمد نجم; 8 March 1944 – 5 June 2019) was an Egyptian actor and comedian.

== Career ==
Negm began his career in the 1960s with the troupe of iconic theatre director and actor Abdel-Monim Madbouly. Thene started acting in 1970 with small roles in cinema and television then he founded his own theatre which bears his name.

One of his most famous plays is Cuckoo's Nest. He is considered a landmark in comedy. Negm put on dozens of other plays, including One Wife is Enough (Zawga Waheda Takfi) (1979) starring Salah Zulfikar. In the same year, Negm starred in Cuckoo's Nest (Esh El-Maganeen) (1979), with Hassan Abdeen and Laila Elwi, and it has always been one of his most popular, and it was staged for over three years. The comedian gave many classic performances including in Hekayty Ma'a El-Zaman, Moled Ya Donia, Bamba Kashar, and many others.

== Death ==
He died on 5 June 2019 due to a stroke, at the age of 75.
