= Abu Muhsin al-Masri =

Egyptian al-Qaeda member (1958–2020)

- Born: Husam Abd-al-Ra'uf; 1958; Egypt
- Died: c. 24 October 2020 (aged 61–62) Ghazni Province, Afghanistan
- Allegiance: al-Qaeda

Abu Muhsin al-Masri (Arabic: أبو محسن المصري, born Husam Abd-al-Ra'uf, Arabic: حسام عبد الرؤوف; 1958 – c. 24 October 2020) was an Egyptian militant and a high-ranking member of al-Qaeda.

== Background ==
He was added to FBI’s Most Wanted Terrorists List in 2019. He was killed in an operation by the National Directorate of Security (NDS) in Central Ghazni Province, Afghanistan. Director of US National Counter-Terrorism Center, Chris Miller, confirmed the death of al-Masri. However, the Federal Bureau of Investigation (FBI) declined to issue any statement in relation to the death of al-Masri.
