= Samia Amin =

Egyptian actress (1945–2020)

- Born: 24 March 1945; Cairo
- Died: 2 August 2020 (aged 75)
- Occupation: Actress
- Years active: 1967-2020

Samia Amin (24 March 1945 – 2 August 2020) (Arabic: سامية أمين ) was an Egyptian actress.

== Career ==
Amin started her career in 1967, and played roles such as a Sa'idi woman and a farmer. During her career, she participated in more than 30 theatre and TV works. One of her most famous roles was her performance in the television series adh-Dho' ash-Sharad. Her son is the Egyptian actor Ahmed Eldemerdash.

== Death ==
Amin died on 2 August 2020, aged 75.
