= Talaat al-Shayeb =

Egyptian translator and intellectual

Talaat Al-Shayeb
- Born: 1942; Al-Batanun village, Egypt
- Died: 1 April 2017 (aged 74–75); New Damietta
- Education: Cairo University

Talaat al-Shayeb (Arabic:طلعت الشايب) (1942–2017) was an Egyptian author, translator and intellectual. He translated and reviewed a nunber of international literature.

== Early life ==
Talaat al-Shayeb was born in 1942 in Al-Batanun village, in the Shibin El Kom Center in modern Menoufia Governorate, then in the Kingdom of Egypt. His parents were an Egyptian. He studied in Al-muaalimeen college in Cairo University in 1958

== Literary Work ==
Al-Shayeb considered one of the most outstanding Egyptian translator who translated from English to Arabic in Egypt in particular, and in the Arabic world in general. He was distinguished of his choices of the titles of the books that he was translating. Al-Shayeb was interested of socio-political and development subjects, in addition to the subjects that contains the third world and dialogue between cultures and civilizations.

Al-shayeb has translated many books and novels in languages like: French, English and Russian to Arabic, the total of which he translated has exceeded 20 work, including: Normal Girl by Arthur Miller, Silk by Alessandro Baricco, Nude Before God by Shiv K. Kumar, The Silent Angel novel by Heinrich Paulus, Follow Your Heart by the Italian Susanna Tamaro, Slowness by Milan kondera, The Pigeon by the German Patrick Zuskind.

Notable works translated by Al-Shayeb include The Clash of Civilizations and the Remaking of the World Order by Samuel Huntington, The Idea of Decline in Western History by Arthur Hermann, and The Cultural Cold War: The CIA and the World of Arts and Letters by Frances Stonor Saunders. He also translated the book In My Childhood, which a study of Arabic biography. As it is distinguished as a translation with a complete literary and narrative flavor of the doctoral thesis in Arabic literature by the Swiss researcher (Titz Roque), In addition to a selection of international poetry, including the poetry collection Voices of Conscience. The book includes fifty poems in English from the International Poetry Bureau of several poets, some of which were translated from the languages of their original poets, before Shayeb translated them into Arabic.

Al-Shayeb also edited the complete encyclopedia of the works of Malaysian Prime Minister Mahathir Mohamad in addition to translating 3 books, including: Islam and the Islamic Nation, A New Plan for Asia, and The Challenge.

Al-shayeb had a high position in the field of the literate and translation Egyptian and Arab cultural community which qualified him to take the position of assistant director of the Egyptian National Center for Translation since its inception in 2007. He remained in his position for four years until his resignation in 2010 to devote himself to reading and translating and participation in local and international cultural confesses and forum.

== Works ==
- The Limits of Freedom of Expression: The Experience of Writing A story and A Novel During the Reign of Abdel Nasser and Al Sadat. (original title: hudod horiyat al ta’abeer: Tajrubat kitabat al-qissa wa Al riwaya fi ahdi abdel nasser wa al sadat) (1995)
- Clash of Civilization: Rebuilding the International System (original title: e’aadat son’a al nitham al alami), (1998)
- Normal Girl (original title: fataah aadeya) (1998)
- The Intellectuals (original title: Al mothaqafoon), (1998)
- Follow Your Heart, (original title: Itba’ae qalbik) (1999)
- Fear of The Mirrors, (alkhouf min almiraya), (2000)
- I am The Moon: Selections From the Chinese Fable, (original title: ana alqamar: mukhtarat min alkhurafa alseeneya) (2000)
- Written: To Emagine a New Story for Your Life, (original title: an tatakhayal qissa jadeedah lihayatik), (2002)
- In My Childhood: Study in the Arabic Biography, (original titlefi tufolati: dirasa fi al seerah al thatiya al Arabia), (2002)
- The Plight of the African Writer, (original title: mihnat al katib al afreeky), (2005)
- American Orientalism: The United States and the Middle East Since 1945, (original title: al istishraq al amrieki: al wilayaat almutahida wa alshark al awsat muntho aam 1945) (2009)
- The Idea of Decline in the Western History, (original title fikrat al edmihlal fi al tareek al gharbi), (2009)
- Who Paid the Piper?: The Cultural Cold War, (original title: man allathy dafa lil zammar ), (2009)
- Arts and Literature Under the Pressure of Globalization, (original title: alfonoon wa aladaab that thagt al awlama), (2009)
- Perhaps One Day in Aleppo Other Stories: Selections of the American short story, (original title: rubamafi halab that youm kesas ukhra: mukhtarat min alkissa alkaseera alamreciya .
- Silk, (original title: alhareer), (2012)
- The World is a Short Story (stories collections), (original title: Alaalam kissa kaseera), (2013)
- Sounds of Conscience, Fifty Poems of World Poetry (original title: sawt althameer: khamsoon kaseeda min al shir alaalamy), (2013)
- Universal Cold War, (original title: alharb albarida alkawniya), (2014)
- The Mediterranean: the History of a Sea, No Sea Like It, (original title: alabyad almutawasit: tareek bahar laysa kamithlih bahar), (2015)
- Depth Obsession, (original title:hawas alomk), (2015)
- Cold War Literate: Writing of the Universal Conflict (original title: adab alharb albarida: kitabat alsiraa alkawni), (2015)
- European Foreign Policy: Is Europe Still Important?, (original title: alsiyasat alkharigia al urobea: hal mazalat muhima), (2016)
- The Silent Angel, (original title: almalak alsamit) (2017)
- From Babylon to the Translator: Interpreting the Middle East, (original title: min babil ela al Tarajima), (2017)
- Cultural Cold War, (original title: alharb albarida althakafia), (2018)
- A public History of the World: As Mankind Made It from the Stone Age to the New Millennium. (Book in two parts) (original title: tareek shabi lilaalam: kama sanaoh al jins albashari min alas alhajari lil alfia aljadeeda), (2019). It was Talaat Al-Shayeb's last work before his death and was published after his death.

== Death ==
Al-Shayeb died on 1 April 2017 after a sudden health crisis during his participation in a symposium of Al-Torji Cultural Salon in New Damietta, where he died before arriving to the hospital.
