= Samir Gharbo =

Egyptian water polo player (1925–2018)

Personal information
- Born: March 13, 1925; Suez, Egypt
- Died: April 10, 2018 (aged 93)

Sport
- Sport: Water polo

Samir Gharbo (13 March 1925 – 10 April 2018) was an Egyptian water polo player who competed in the 1948 Summer Olympics and in the 1952 Summer Olympics.
