= Abdel Fattah el-Sisi =

President of Egypt since 2014

His Excellency Abdel Fattah el-Sisi
- عبد الفتاح السيسى
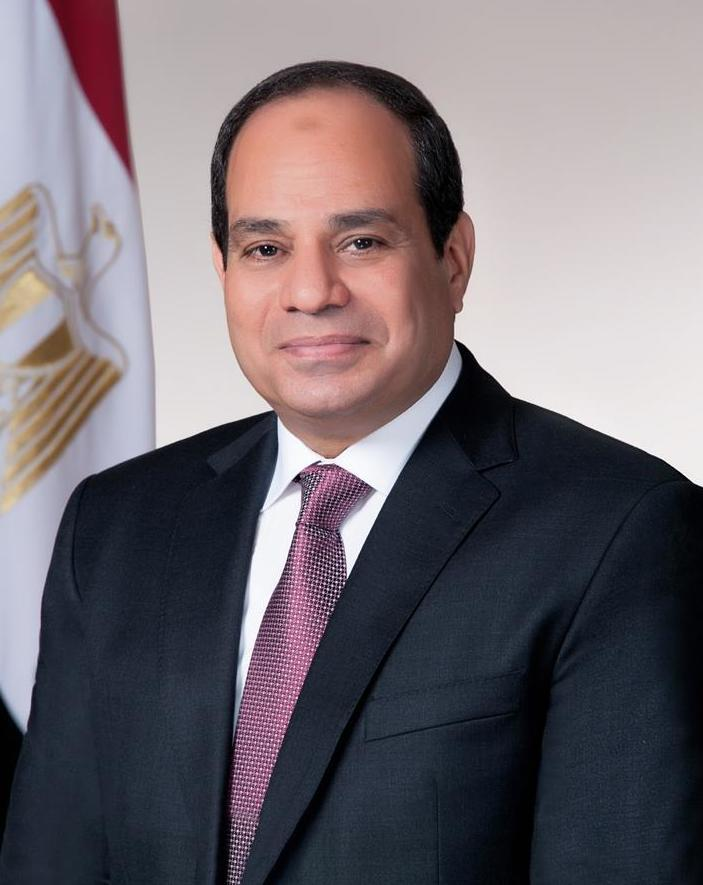
- Official portrait, 2017

6th President of Egypt
- Incumbent
- Assumed office 8 June 2014
- Prime Minister: Ibrahim Mahlab; Sherif Ismail; Mostafa Madbouly
- Preceded by: Mohamed Morsi; Adly Mansour (interim)

Deputy Prime Minister of Egypt
- In office 16 July 2013 – 26 March 2014
- Prime Minister: Hazem al-Beblawi; Ibrahim Mahlab

17th Chairperson of the African Union
- In office 10 February 2019 – 10 February 2020
- Preceded by: Paul Kagame
- Succeeded by: Cyril Ramaphosa

Minister of Defence
- In office 12 August 2012 – 26 March 2014
- Prime Minister: Hesham Qandil; Hazem al-Beblawi; Ibrahim Mahlab
- Preceded by: Mohamed Hussein Tantawi
- Succeeded by: Sedki Sobhy

Commander-in-Chief of the Armed Forces
- In office 12 August 2012 – 26 March 2014
- Preceded by: Mohamed Hussein Tantawi
- Succeeded by: Sedki Sobhy

Director of Military Intelligence
- In office 3 January 2010 – 12 August 2012
- Preceded by: Murad Muwafi
- Succeeded by: Mahmoud Hegazy

Personal details
- Born: Abd el-Fattah Saeed Hussein Khalil el-Sisi; 19 November 1954 (age 71) El Gamaleya, Cairo, Egypt
- Party: Independent
- Spouse: Entissar Amer (m. 1977)
- Children: 4, including Mahmoud
- Education: Egyptian Military Academy

Military service
- Branch/service: Egyptian Army
- Years of service: 1977–2014
- Rank: Field marshal
- Unit: Infantry
- Battles/wars: Gulf War; Sinai insurgency; Second Libyan Civil War; Yemeni Civil War; Egyptian crisis

Abdel Fattah Saeed Hussein Khalil el-Sisi (Note: Arabic: عبد الفتاح سعيد حسين خليل السيسى pronounced [ʕæbdel.fætˈtæːħ sæˈʕiːd ħeˈseːn xæˈliːl ɪsˈsiːsi]) (born 19 November 1954) is an Egyptian politician and retired military officer who has served as the sixth president of Egypt since 2014.

After the 2011 Egyptian revolution and 2012 election of Mohamed Morsi to the Egyptian presidency, the first democratic election in the history of the country, Sisi was appointed Minister of Defense and Commander-in-Chief of the Egyptian Armed Forces in August 2012, replacing Hussein Tantawi. Following large scale protests against Morsi's presidency, Sisi led the 2013 Egyptian coup d'état, overthrowing Morsi on 3 July 2013. Demonstrations and sit-ins organized by supporters of the Muslim Brotherhood and Egyptian democracy followed.

Under the command of Sisi, two camps of protesters were violently dispersed in Cairo: one at al-Nahda Square and a larger one at Rabaa al-Adawiya Square, the Rabaa massacre, leading to international criticism. The dispersal of pro-Morsi sit-ins by the police and military forces resulted in the killing of about 800 to 1,000+ protestors and the arrests of almost 19,000. Human Rights Watch describes the massacres as crimes against humanity.

After the 2014 presidential election, Sisi was sworn into office as President of Egypt in June 2014. Sisi faced minimal opposition in the 2018 and 2023 presidential elections, after other candidates were barred from running or boycotted the election due to repression. Most independent observers view Sisi as a dictator. He leads an authoritarian government and, according to Human Rights Watch, "relies on naked coercion and the military and security services as his main vehicles of control". Elements of his rule have been described as even more draconian than that of prior authoritarian leader Hosni Mubarak, who was president from 1981 to 2011. In 2024, Egyptian citizens and activists organised an online "Dignity Revolution", resulting in widespread anti-regime protests. Sisi's government heavily cracked down on dissent in response, arbitrarily detaining hundreds. Analysts have described Egypt under Sisi as "The Sick Man of the Middle East" due to his fragile rule and Egypt's economic turbulence.

== Early life and military education ==
Sisi was born in the Gamaleya neighbourhood of Historic Cairo on 19 November 1954 to Said Hussein Khalil al-Sisi and Soad Ibrahim Mohamed, both from Monufia Governorate. He grew up in Gamaleya, near al-Azhar Mosque, in a quarter where Muslims, Jews and Christians resided and in which he later recalled how, during his childhood, he had heard church bells and watched Jews flock to synagogue unhindered.

He later enrolled in the Egyptian Military Academy, and upon graduating he held various command positions in the Egyptian Armed Forces and served as Egypt's military attaché in Riyadh. In 1987, he attended the Egyptian Command and Staff College. In 1992, he continued his military career by enrolling in the British Command and Staff College, and, in 2006, enrolled in the United States Army War College in Carlisle, Pennsylvania. Sisi was the youngest member of the Supreme Council of the Armed Forces (SCAF) during the Egyptian Revolution of 2011, serving as the director of military intelligence and reconnaissance department. He was later chosen to replace Mohamed Hussein Tantawi and serve as the commander-in-chief and Minister of Defense and Military Production on 12 August 2012.

Sisi's family origins were in the Monufia Governorate. He is the second eldest of eight siblings. His father, a conservative Muslim, who later had six additional children with a second wife, owned an antiques shop for tourists in the historic bazaar of Khan el-Khalili.

Sisi and his siblings studied at the nearby library at al-Azhar University. Unlike his brothers—one of whom is a senior judge, another a civil servant—Sisi went to a local army-run secondary school, where he developed a relationship with his maternal cousin, Entissar Amer. They were married upon Sisi's graduation from the Egyptian Military Academy in 1977. He attended the following courses:

- General Command and Staff Course, Egyptian Command and Staff College, 1987;
- General Command and Staff Course, Joint Command and Staff College, United Kingdom, 1992;
- War Course, Fellowship of the Higher War College, Nasser Military Academy, Egypt, 2003;
- War Course, United States Army War College, United States, 2006;
- Egyptian Armed Forces military attaché in Riyadh, Saudi Arabia;
- Basic Infantry Course, United States

== Military career (1977–2014) ==
Sisi received his commission as a military officer in 1977, serving in the mechanised infantry and specialising in anti-tank warfare and mortar warfare. He became Commander of the Northern Military Region-Alexandria in 2008 and then Director of Military Intelligence and Reconnaissance from 2010 until his appointment as Defense Minister by former President Mohamed Morsi in 2012. Sisi was the youngest member of the Supreme Council of the Armed Forces.

While a member of the Supreme Council, he made controversial statements regarding allegations that Egyptian soldiers had subjected detained female demonstrators to forced virginity tests. He is reported to have told Egypt's state-owned newspaper that "the virginity-test procedure was done to protect the girls from rape, as well as to protect the soldiers and officers from rape accusations". He was the first member of the Supreme Council of the Armed Forces to admit that the invasive tests had been carried out.

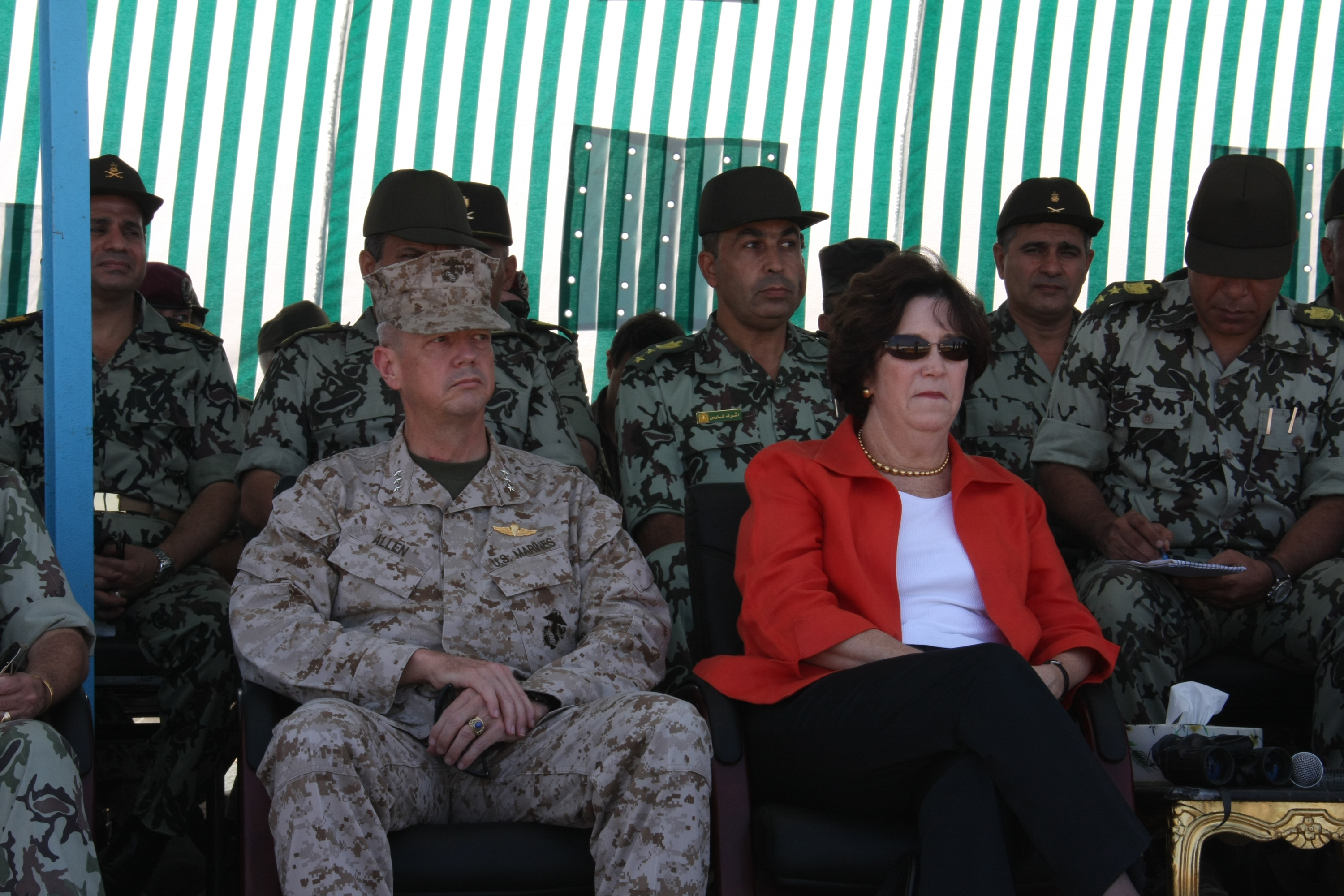
Sisi (far left, back row) attending Exercise Bright Star, 2009

=== Main command positions ===
- Commander, 509th Mechanized Infantry Battalion
- Chief of Staff, 134th Mechanized Infantry Brigade
- Commander, 16th Mechanized Infantry Brigade
- Chief of Staff, 2nd Mechanized Infantry Division
- Chief of Staff, Northern Military Zone
- Deputy Director, Military Intelligence and Reconnaissance Department
- Director, Military Intelligence and Reconnaissance Department

Also reported is commander of the 23rd Mechanized Division, Third Field Army.

=== Minister of Defense ===
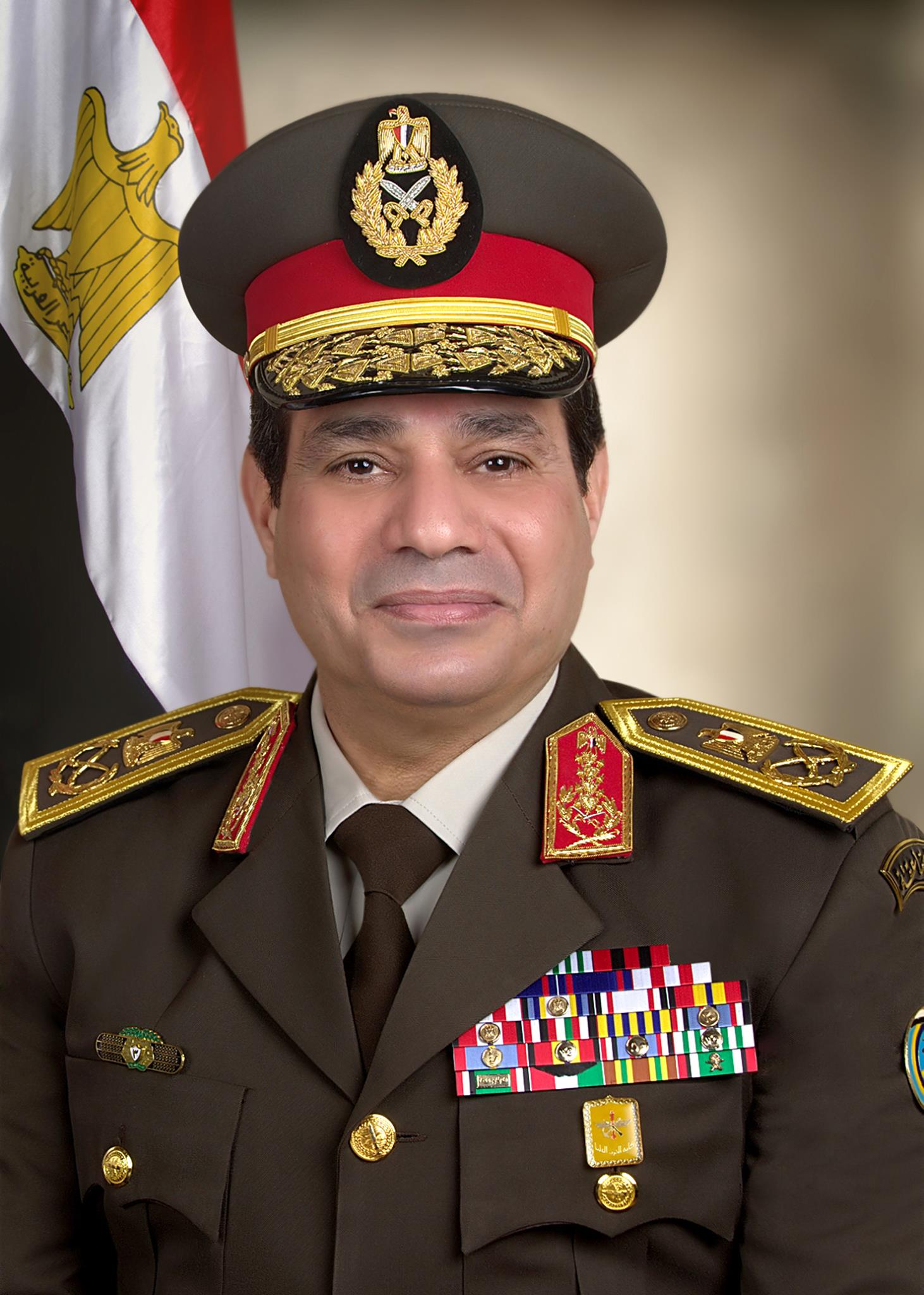
Abdel Fattah el-Sisi's official portrait as Minister of Defense, 2014

On 12 August 2012, Egyptian President Mohamed Morsi made a decision to replace the Mubarak-era Field Marshal Mohamed Hussein Tantawi, the head of the Egyptian Armed Forces, with then little-known Sisi. He also promoted him to the rank of colonel general. Sisi was then described by the official website of the ruling Muslim Brotherhood-aligned Freedom and Justice Party as a "defense minister with revolutionary taste". Sisi also took the post of Minister of Defense and Military Production in the Qandil Cabinet.

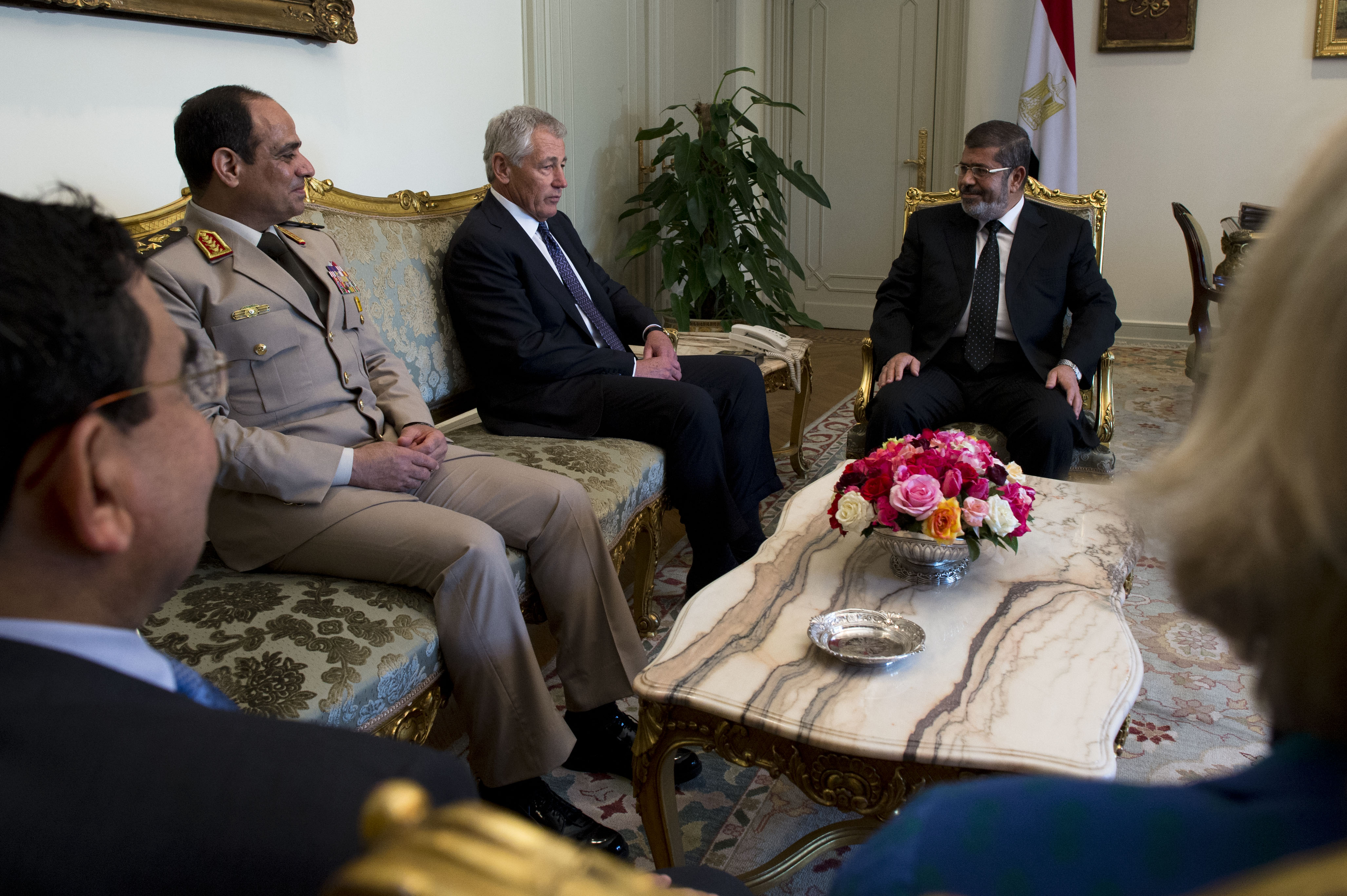
General al-Sisi (left) and then President Mohamed Morsi (right) listen to visiting U.S. Secretary of Defense Chuck Hagel (centre) during a meeting with U.S. officials on 24 April 2013, just months before Sisi overthrew Morsi in a coup d'état.

Sisi was appointed as Minister of Defense on 12 August 2012. He remained in office under the new government formed after the deposition of Morsi, and led by Hazem al-Beblawi. He was also appointed Deputy Prime Minister of Egypt. On 27 January 2014, he was promoted to the rank of field marshal.

=== Coup d'état and Rabaa massacre ===
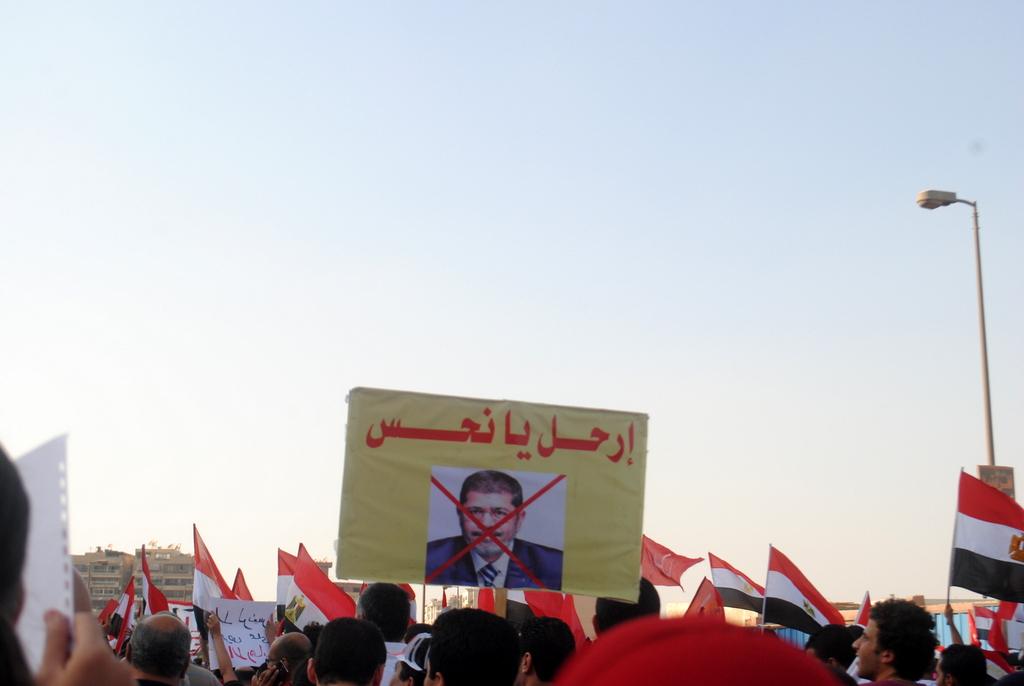
Demonstrations against President Morsi, June 2013

Mass demonstrations occurred on 30 June 2013 as Egyptians took to the streets to protest policies of the democratically-elected Morsi government. Soon afterwards, the Egyptian Army issued a 48-hour ultimatum which aired on television that gave the country's political parties until 3 July to meet their demands. The Egyptian military also threatened to intervene if the dispute was not resolved by then.

On 3 July 2013, the Egyptian Armed Forces initiated a coup d'état. The army then installed the Chief Justice of the Supreme Constitutional Court Adly Mansour as the interim head of state in his place until a new president could be elected, and ordered the arrest of many members of the Muslim Brotherhood on charges of "inciting violence and disturbing general security and peace". Sisi announced on television that the president had "failed to meet the demands of the Egyptian people" and declared that the constitution would be temporarily suspended, which was met by acceptance from anti-Morsi protesters and condemnation from pro-Morsi supporters in Rabaa al-Adawiya.

On 24 July 2013, during a speech at a military parade, Sisi called for mass demonstrations to grant the Egyptian military and police a "mandate" to crack down on pro-democracy protestors. While supporters interpreted this to mean that Sisi felt the need of the people to prove to the world that it was not a coup but the popular will, the statement was seen by opponents as contradicting the military's pledges to hand over power to civilians after removing Morsi and as indicating an imminent crackdown against Islamists.

The reactions to Sisi's announcement ranged from open support from the interim Egyptian presidency and the Tamarod movement to rejection by much of civil society, the Muslim Brotherhood, the Salafi Nour Party, the Strong Egypt Party, the liberal April 6 Youth Movement and human rights groups.

During the dispersal process of anti-coup protestors, the Egyptian military under Sisi's command was involved in assisting the national police in dispersing two sit-ins held by anti-coup protestors in Rabaa el-Adaweya and Nahda squares. This action resulted in led to murder of over 900 protestors by Egyptian security forces in the Rabaa Massacre. Human Rights Watch described the sit-in dispersals as crimes against humanity and called them "one of the world's largest killings of demonstrators in a single day in recent history." In 2023, Amnesty International released stated that, "The 10-year anniversary of the Rabaa massacre is a stark reminder of how impunity for the mass killing of over 900 people has enabled an all-out assault on peaceful dissent, an erosion of any fair trial safeguards in the criminal justice system, and unspeakable cruelty in prisons over the past decade, Amnesty International said today."

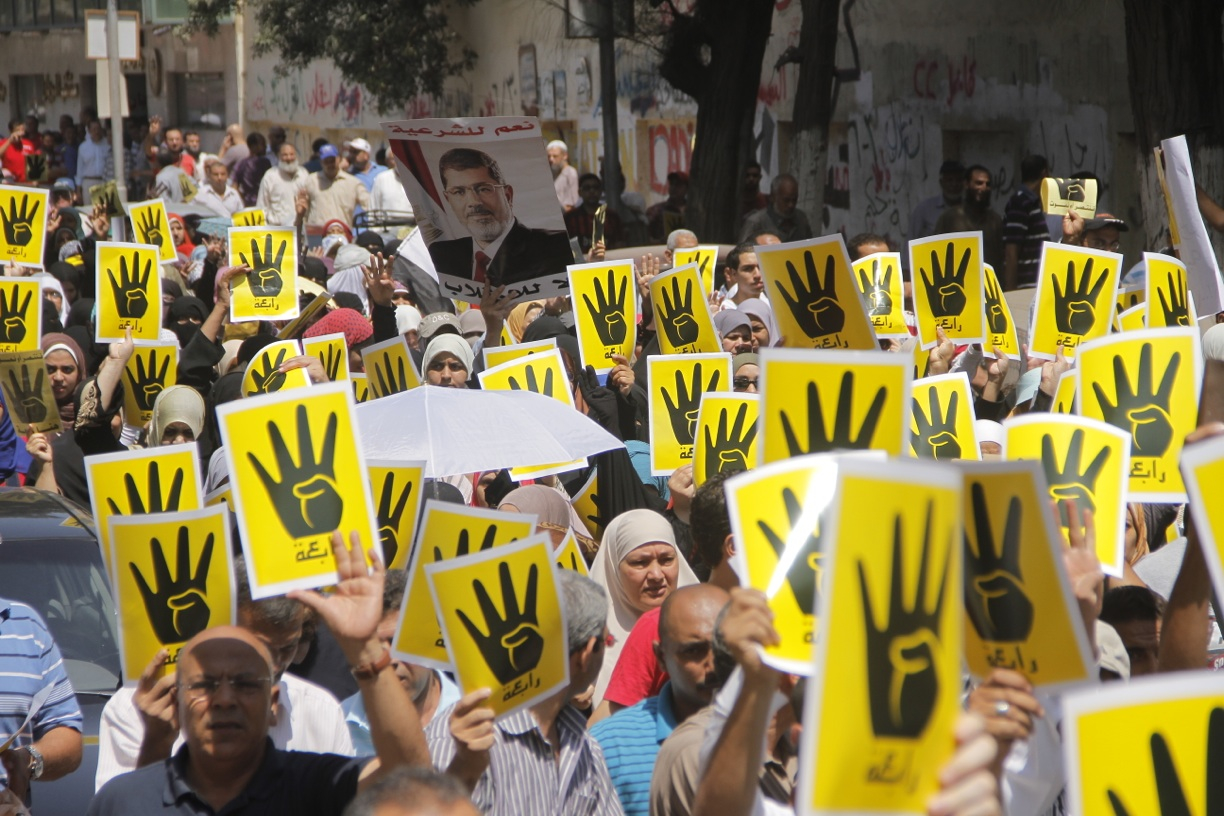
Muslim Brotherhood supporters protesting against Sisi in solidarity with the victims of the Rabaa Massacre in Cairo, August 2013

Writing for British newspaper The Independent in August 2013, Robert Fisk described then-General Sisi as being at a loss, but that a massacre—as Fisk called the sit-in dispersal—would go down in history as an infamy. Writing for the American magazine Time, Lee Smith concluded that "Egypt's new leader [was] unfit to rule", referring not to the actual head of government at the time, interim president Adly Mansour, but to Sisi.

In a file published by the State Information Services, the government explained the raids by stating that "police went on to use force dispersing the sit-in on 14 August 2013 with the least possible damage, causing hundreds of civilians and police to fall as victims, while Muslim Brotherhood supporters imposed a blockade for 46 days against the people in al-Nahda and Rabaa al-Adawiya squares under the name of sit-in where tens of protesters took to the street daily hindered the lives of the Egyptians, causing unrest and the death or injury of many victims as well as damage to public and private properties".

On 3 August 2013, Sisi gave his first interview since the overthrow of Mohamed Morsi. Speaking to The Washington Post, he criticised the US response, and accused the Obama administration of disregarding the Egyptian popular will and of providing insufficient support amid threats of a civil war, saying, "You left the Egyptians. You turned your back on the Egyptians and they won't forget that."

On the 40th anniversary of the Yom Kippur War (also known as the October War) on 6 October 2013, Sisi called for the "unification of Arabs" during a ceremony attended by the ministers of defence of the UAE, Bahrain, Morocco, Jordan and Iraq. He declared the Egyptian army's solidarity with anti-Morsi rallies and commented that the relationship between the army and people was "hard to break", adding: "We would die before you [the Egyptian people] would feel pain". He also compared the army to the Great Pyramid of Giza, saying that "it cannot be broken".

==== Civil liberties ====
After Sisi had removed Morsi from office and disbanded the Egyptian Senate, in September 2013 interim president Adly Mansour temporarily decreed that ministers could award contracts without a request for tender. In the next month, the government awarded building contracts worth approximately one billion dollars to the Egyptian Army. In April 2014, the interim government's Investment Law banned appeals against government contracts.

Also in September 2013, the interim government removed pre-trial detention limits for certain crimes, allowing certain individuals remain in detention indefinitely. In November 2013, the interim government temporarily banned protests in an attempt to combat the growing pro-Brotherhood unrest; the police arrested thousands of Egyptians using the new law.

On 24 March 2014, an Egyptian court sentenced 529 members of the Muslim Brotherhood to death, following an attack on a police station in 2013, an act described by Amnesty International as "the largest single batch of simultaneous death sentences we've seen in recent years [...] anywhere in the world". The BBC reported that by May 2016, approximately 40,000 people, mostly Brotherhood members or loyalists, had been imprisoned since Morsi's overthrow.

==== Cult of personality ====
The anti-Morsi demonstrators on the streets welcomed Sisi's announcement of the overthrow of Morsi with celebrations and carried posters of Sisi, chanting "The Army and the People are one hand" and supporting General Sisi. On social networks, thousands of Egyptians changed their profile pictures to pictures of Sisi, while others started campaigns requesting that Sisi be promoted to the rank of field marshal, and others hoped that he would be nominated in the next presidential elections.

Cupcakes, chocolate and necklaces bearing the "CC" initials were created, restaurants in Egypt named sandwiches after him, blogs shared his pictures, and columns, op-eds, television shows and interviews discussed the "new idol of the Nile valley" in the Egyptian mainstream media. On 6 December 2013, Sisi was named "Time Person of the Year" in Time magazine's annual reader poll. The accompanying article noted that "Sisi's success reflected the genuine popularity of a man who led what was essentially a military coup in July against the democratically elected government of then President Mohammed Morsi".

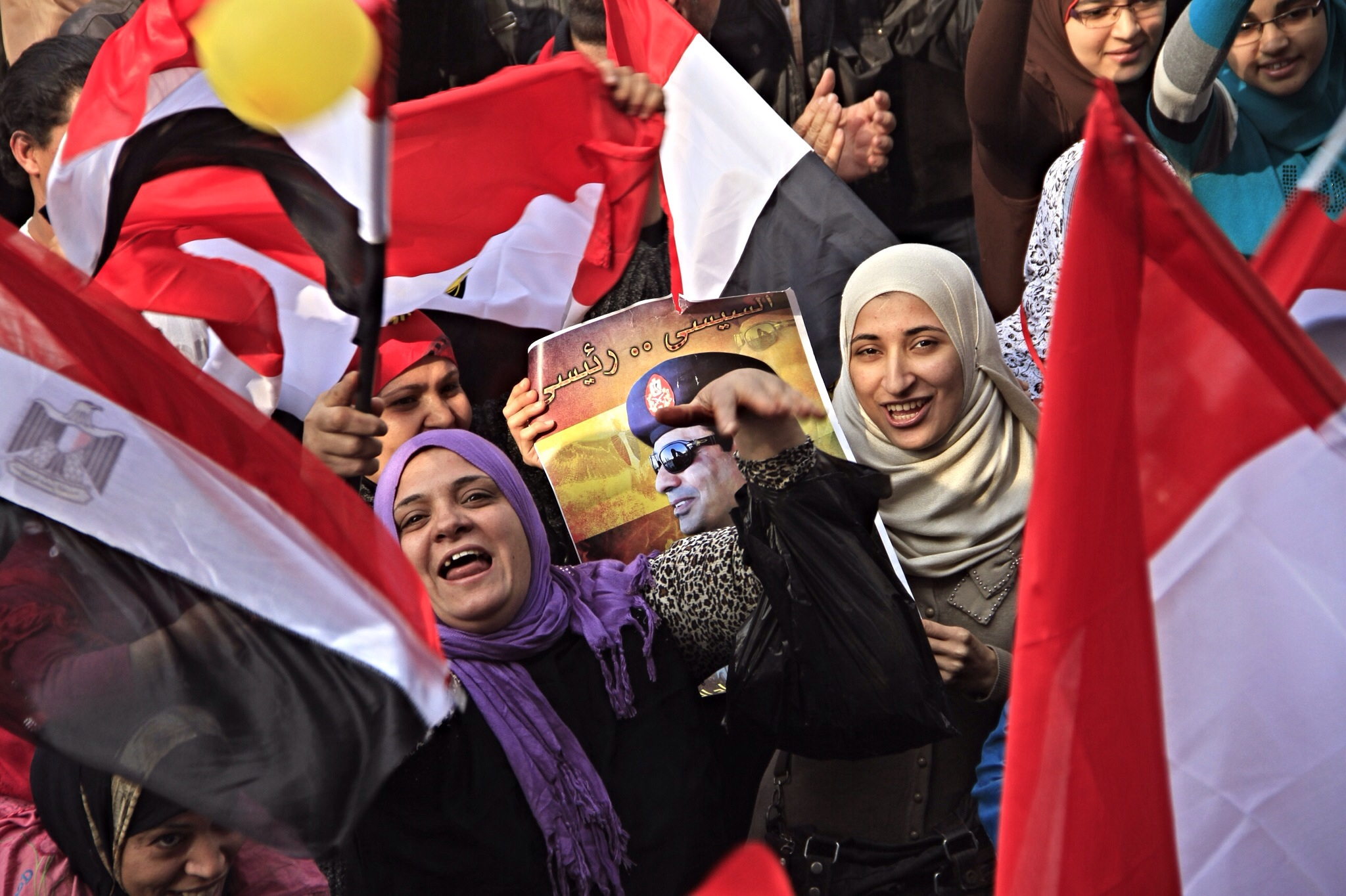
Sisi's supporters holding flags and pictures of him during the 2014 presidential election

The "Kamel Gemilak" (Finish Your Favor) and "Sisi for President" campaigns were started to gather signatures to press Sisi, who at the time stated that he had no desire to govern, to run for presidency. Many politicians and parties including Egyptians and non-Egyptians had announced their support for Sisi in the event of his running for president, including the National Salvation Front, Tamarod, Amr Moussa, a previous candidate for the presidency, Abdel-Hakim Abdel-Nasser, son of late President Gamal Abdel Nasser, unsuccessful presidential candidate Ahmed Shafik, Prime Minister Hazem Al Beblawi, Naguib Sawiris, the Free Egyptians Party, the Revolutionary Forces Bloc, and the Russian president Vladimir Putin.

Hamdeen Sabahi ran against him in the presidential race. Subsequently, Sabahi issued criticisms of Sisi and his candidacy by expressing doubt about Sisi's commitment to democracy, arguing that the general bears a measure of direct and indirect responsibility for the human rights violations carried out during the period of the interim government. He also denounced what he deemed to be the transitional government's hostility toward the goals of the revolution.

Kamel Gemilak claimed to have collected 26 million signatures asking Sisi to run for president. On 21 January 2014, Kamel Gemilak organised a mass conference call in Cairo International Stadium to call on Sisi to run for president. On 6 February 2014, the Kuwaiti newspaper al-Seyassah claimed that Sisi would run for president, saying that he had to meet the wishes of the Egyptian people for him to run.

On 26 March 2014 Sisi announced that he would run for president in the presidential election. Shortly after his announcement, popular hashtags were started for and against Sisi's presidential bid. The presidential election, which took place in May 2014, saw Sisi win 96 percent of votes counted. It was notably held without the participation of the Muslim Brotherhood's Freedom & Justice Party, which had won every prior post-Mubarak electoral contest, and continues to remain absent from subsequent elections.

== Presidency (2014–present) ==
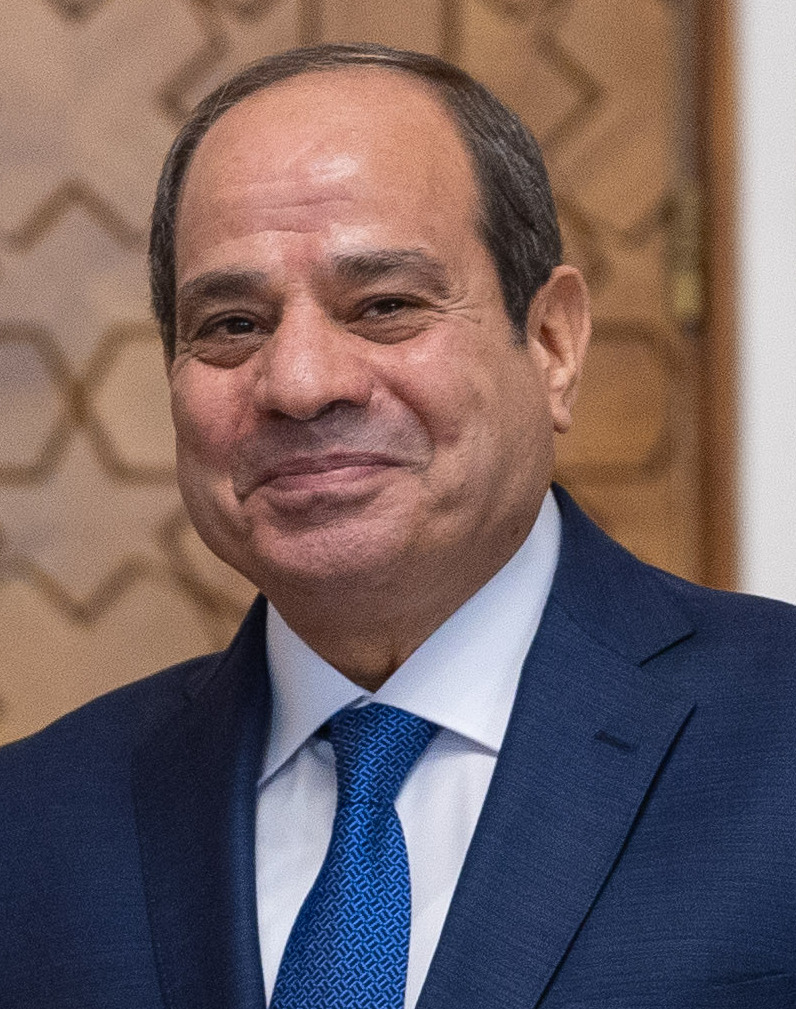
Sisi in 2023

President Sisi was sworn into office on 8 June 2014. The event was marked by an impromptu public holiday in Egypt in conjunction with festivals held nationwide. Tahrir Square was prepared to receive millions of Egyptians celebrating Sisi's presidency; police and soldiers shut down the square outlets with barbed wires and barricades, as well as electronic portals for detecting any explosives that could spoil the festivities.

Sisi's oath of office was administered in the morning in Egypt's Supreme constitutional court in front of the deputy head of the constitutional court, Maher Sami, who described Sisi as a "rebel soldier" and a "revolutionary hero"; ex-president Adly Mansour; other constitutional court members; and a group of Egypt's top politicians. Sisi later moved to the Heliopolis Palace, where a 21-gun salute welcomed the new president, before the ex-president received Sisi near the palace's stairway. Sisi then presided over a reception for the foreign presidents, emirs, kings, and official delegations who had been invited. No representatives of Turkey, Tunisia or Qatar were invited, reportedly because of their governments' critical stances regarding then-recent coup in Egypt; representatives of Israel were also not invited.

In a ceremony at Heliopolis Palace, Sisi gave a speech to the attendees. He and the previous president, Adly Mansour, also signed a document officially transferring power to Sisi, which was the first time in Egyptian history that power had been transferred in this way. Sisi then went on to Koubbeh Palace, where the final ceremony was held. There, he gave the final speech of the day to 1,200 attendees representing a spectrum of the Egyptian people—from various walks of life and from each of the provinces of Egypt. He described the problems that he said Egypt was facing, and his plan for addressing them, and declared, "In its next phase, Egypt will witness a total rise on both internal and external fronts, to compensate for what we have missed and correct the mistakes of the past". Sisi then issued his first presidential decree, conferring the Order of the Nile upon the previous interim-president, Adly Mansour.

=== Domestic policy ===
According to the American organization Freedom House in 2021, President Abdel Fattah al-Sisi has governed Egypt in an authoritarian manner. Freedom House claims that meaningful political opposition is virtually nonexistent in the country, and that security forces engage in human rights abuses with impunity.

Sisi has expressed his personal concerns about the issue of sexual assault in Egypt. He was photographed during a hospital visit to a woman receiving treatment after an assault during celebrations in Cairo's Tahrir Square, ordering the army, the police, and the media to counter the issue.

Sisi has called for the reform and modernisation of Islam; to that end, he has taken measures within Egypt such as regulating mosque sermons and changing school textbooks (including the removal of some content on Saladin and Uqba ibn Nafi inciting or glorifying hatred and violence). He has also called for an end to the Islamic verbal divorce; however, this was rejected by a council of scholars from Al-Azhar University.

Sisi also became the first Egyptian president in the country's history to attend Christmas Mass and gave a speech at the Coptic Orthodox Christmas service in Cairo in January 2015 calling for unity and wishing the Christians a merry Christmas.

==== Human rights policy ====
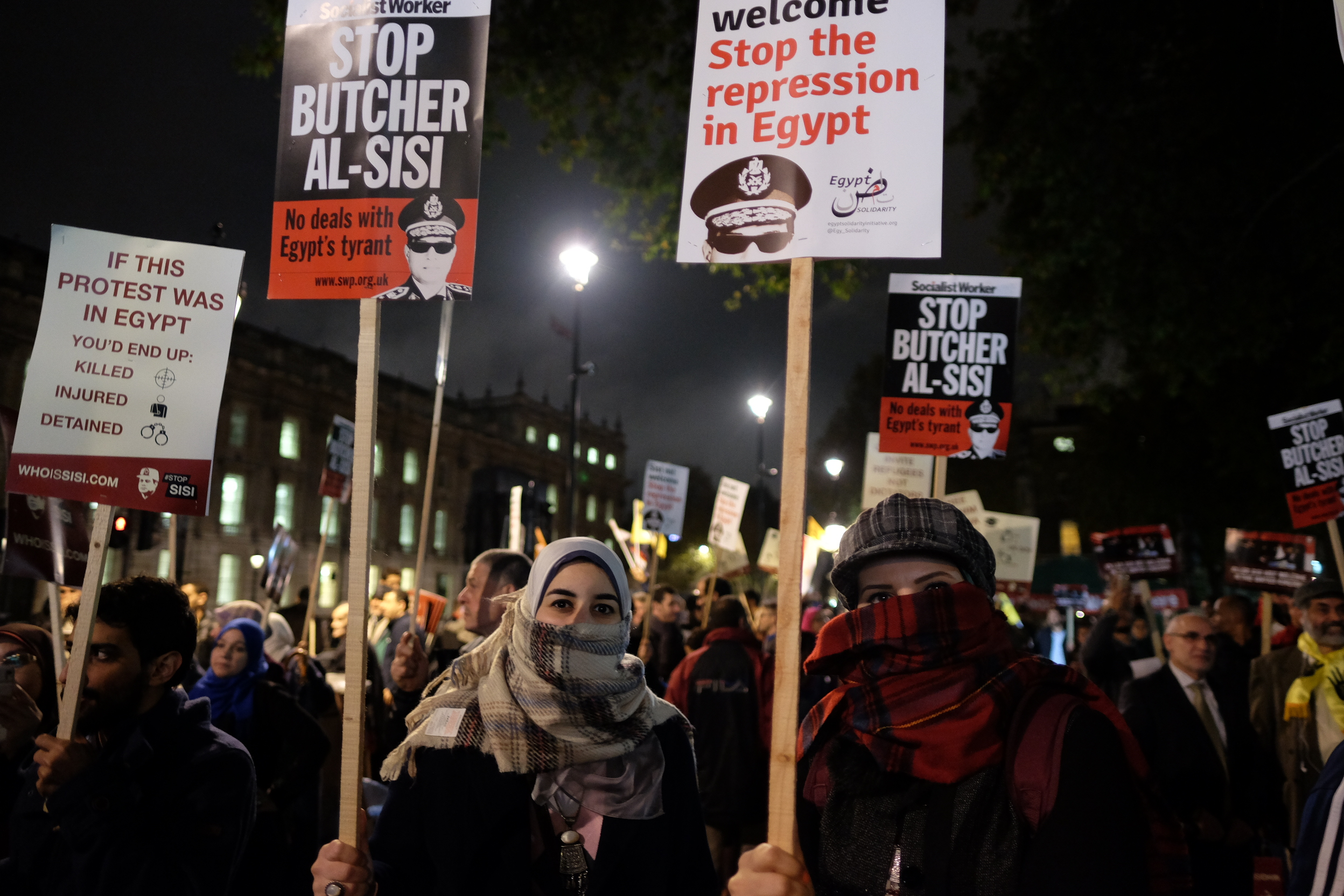
Protesters outside 10 Downing Street opposed to Sisi's visit to the UK, November 2015

The U.S.-based organization Human Rights Watch has accused Sisi's government of using torture and enforced disappearances against political opponents and criminal suspects. HRW has claimed that extrajudicial killings were committed by the military during its campaign against Wilayah Sayna, an ISIS affiliate in North Sinai. HRW has also accused Sisi's government of using prosecutions, travel bans and asset freezes against human rights defenders, and legislations that HRW says threatens the country's civil society. HRW has also accused the government of conducting arbitrary arrests and torture against children as young as twelve.

International human rights organizations such as Human Rights Watch and Amnesty International estimated that there were about 60,000 political prisoners in Egypt as of January 2020.

Protests against Sisi's government broke out on 20 September 2019, after videos published by Spain-based Egyptian contractor Mohamed Ali alleged that public funds had been mismanaged under Sisi's presidency. The protests were quickly dispersed by police shortly afterward.

Sisi blamed political Islam for protests and instability. According to him, "As long as we have political Islam movements that aspire for power, our region will remain in a state of instability." Sisi stated that public opinion in Egypt would not accept political Islam to return to government, referring to the protests against Morsi in 2013 and Morsi's subsequent overthrow.

==== Economic reforms ====
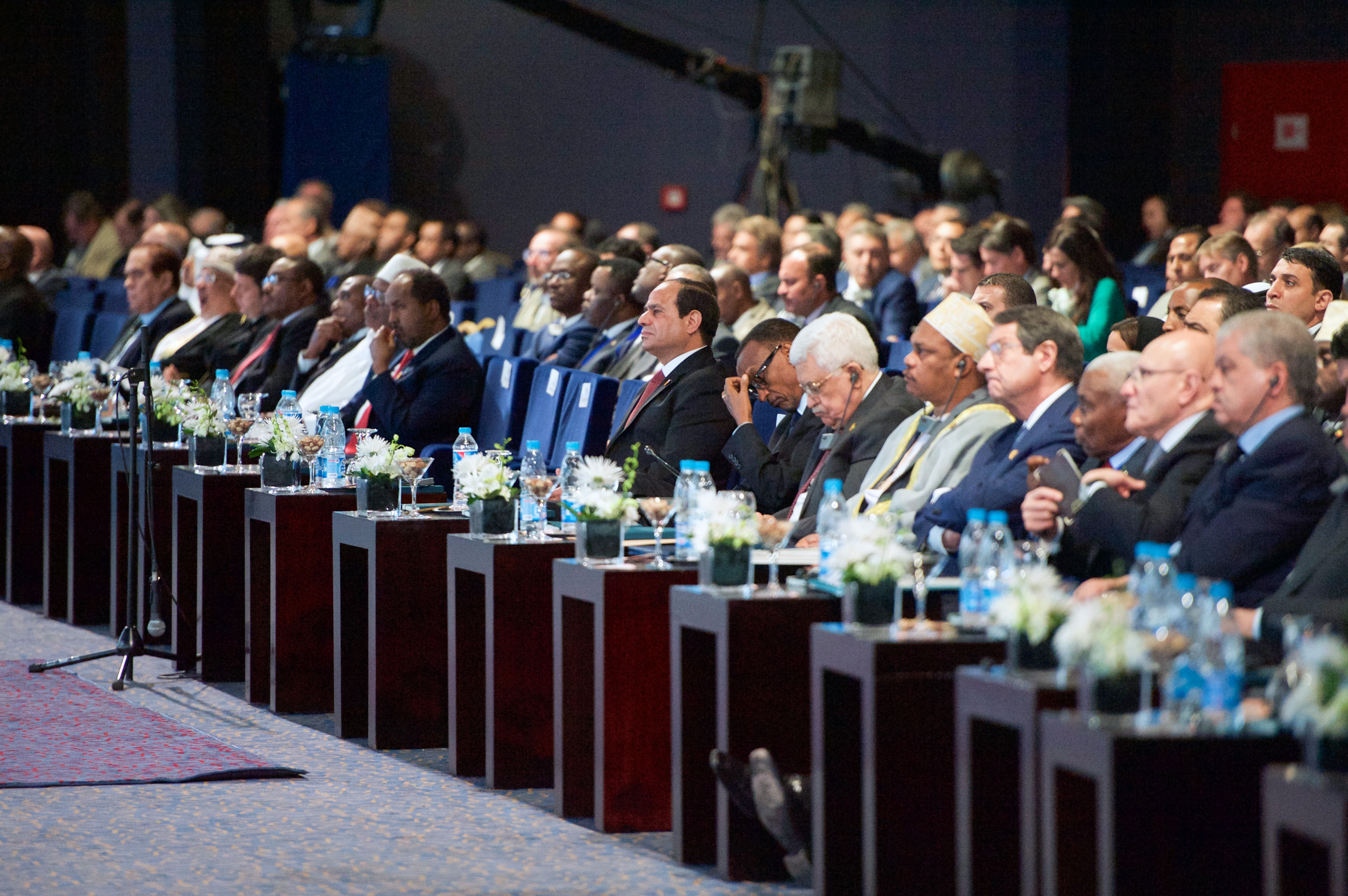
Sisi listens as US Secretary of State John Kerry addresses the EEDC

Sisi, who is reportedly facing a severe economic ordeal in Egypt, has decided to raise fuel prices by 78 percent as an introduction to cut the subsidies on basic food stuffs and energy, which use nearly a quarter of the state budget. The Egyptian government has traditionally provided these subsidies as a crucial aid to millions of people who live in poverty, fearing people's anger in five years time. Egypt had spent $96 billion on energy subsidies in a decade, which made gasoline in Egypt among the world's cheapest.

Cutting the energy subsidies will save EGP51 billion. The government hopes the decision will benefit services such as health and education. Sisi also raised taxes on alcohol and cigarettes, applying a flat tax on local and imported cigarettes to between 25 and 40 cents per pack, as well as new property taxes, and plans to introduce a new scheme for value-added taxes. Chicken prices would reportedly rise by 25 percent days after the decision because of added transportation costs. Mini-bus and taxi fares were raised by about 13 percent.

Slashing subsidies was recommended by international financial institutions, but no prior Egyptian leader had managed to broach the issue, fearing unrest in a country where nearly 30 percent of the population lives in poverty and rely on government aid. President Sisi defended the decision to raise fuel prices, saying it was "bitter medicine" that should have been taken before and was "50 years late" but was not taken, as governments feared a backlash like the Bread Riots of 1977.

Sisi, who had previously accepted only half of his own pay, called on Egyptians to make sacrifices, vowing to repair an economy growing at the slowest pace in two decades. Sisi warned Egyptians of more pain over the next two years from economic problems that he said had accumulated over the last four decades and needed to be fixed. Egypt also paid more than $6 billion it owed to foreign oil companies within two months. By March 2015 after 8 months of Sisi's rule, Egypt's external debt fell to $39.9 billion, a drop of 13.5 percent.

In 2015, as a result of the economic reforms, Moody's raised Egypt's credit ratings outlook to stable from negative and Fitch Ratings upgraded Egypt's credit rating one step to "B" from "B−". In November 2013, Standard & Poor's rated Egypt B-minus with a stable outlook and upgraded Egypt's credit rating . In April 2015, Moody's upgraded Egypt's outlook from Caa1 to B3 with stable outlook expecting real GDP growth in Egypt to recover to 4.5% year-on-year for the fiscal year 2015, which ends in June, and then to rise to around 5–6% over the coming four years compared to 2.5% in 2014.

In May 2015, Egypt chose the banks to handle its return to the international bond market after a gap of five years marking a return of economic and political stability in the country after the revolution of 2011. In early 2016, the Egyptian pound suffered from devaluation: in February when the pound was allowed to float briefly, its value reduced rapidly from £E7.83 per US dollar to £E8.95 per dollar, resulting in increased prices for everyday goods.

==== Energy policy ====
Considered its worst in decades, Egypt's energy crisis that helped inflame the protests against former president Mohamed Morsi continued to grow in Sisi's first months in office, challenging the new government. Due to shortage in energy production, growing consumption, terrorist attacks on Egypt's energy infrastructure, debts to foreign oil companies and the absence of the needed periodic maintenance of the power plants, the energy blackout rates in Egypt rose to unprecedented levels, with some parts of the country facing around six power cuts a day for up to two hours each.

In August 2014, daily electricity consumption hit a record high of 27.7 gigawatts, 20% more power than stations could provide. The next month Egypt suffered a massive power outage that halted parts of the Cairo Metro, took television stations off the air, and ground much of the country to a halt for several hours because of the sudden loss of 50 percent of the country's power generation. Sisi said that the idler would be held accountable and promised to partially solve the economic crisis by August 2015, and that, beginning with December that year, the crisis will be dealt with entirely.

Both long-term and short-term plans were introduced. In the short-term, Egypt signed a contract with General Electric (GE) to provide the country with 2.6 gigawatts by the summer of 2015. The first phase entered service in June and the final phase was expected to be completed by the end of August, making it one of the fastest energy transferring operations in the world according to GE.

In June 2015, Sisi's administration stated that for the first time in years, Egypt achieved a surplus in power generating capacity estimated at 2.9 gigawatts. In the long-term, Egypt paid more than $6 billion it owed to foreign oil companies between January and March. Energy contracts were placed as a top priority in the Egypt Economic Development Conference in March 2015, resulting in a $9 billion contract with Siemens to supply gas and wind power plants to boost the country's electricity generation by 50 percent, in addition to an energy deal worth $12 billion (£E91.5 billion) with BP to provide the country with an extra quarter of local energy production.

Sisi stated that Egypt is not just solving its energy crisis, but rather seeking to become a "global hub for energy trading". In Nicosia on 21 November 2017 he met President of Cyprus Nicos Anastasiades and the Prime Minister of Greece Alexis Tsipras. They encouraged and welcomed private sector initiatives of energy infrastructure projects, important for energy security of all three countries such as the EuroAfrica Interconnector, interconnector between Greek, Cypriot, and Egypt power grids via submarine power cable of length around 1,619-kilometre (1,006 mi).

==== National projects ====
In August 2014, President Sisi initiated a new Suez Canal, a parallel channel running about one-third the length of the existing waterway, which would double capacity of the existing canal from 49 to 97 ships a day. The new canal is expected to increase the Suez Canal's revenues by 259% from current annual revenues of $5 billion. The project cost around 60 billion Egyptian-pounds ($8.4 billion) and was fast-tracked over a year. Sisi insisted funding come from Egyptian sources only. The new canal was inaugurated on schedule on 6 August 2015.

Sisi introduced the Suez Canal Area Development Project which developed five new seaports in the three provinces surrounding the canal, a new industrial zone west of the Gulf of Suez, economic zones around the waterway, seven new tunnels between Sinai and the Egyptian home land, building a new Ismailia city, huge fish farms, and a technology valley within Ismailia.

Sisi started the National Roads Project, which involves building a road network of more than 4,400 kilometres and uses 104 acres of land, promising that there are many development and reconstruction campaigns for Egypt to reduce the unemployment rate and increase the poor's income.

An ambitious plan to build a new city near Cairo to serve as the country's new capital was announced during the Egypt Economic Development Conference. Located east of Cairo approximately midway between Cairo and Suez, this proposed new capital of Egypt is yet to be formally named and is intended to relieve population pressures from the greater Cairo area.

In 2016, President Sisi set a national goal of eliminating all unsafe slums in two years. The first stage of the project was inaugurated on 30 May 2016 containing 11,000 housing units built at a cost of £E1.56 billion (US$177.8 Million). Funding was provided by the "Long Live Egypt" economic development fund in collaboration with civilian charitable organizations. The ultimate goal is the construction of 850,000 housing units with additional stages in processes funded in the same manner.

An agricultural plan, under the name "New Delta Project", aims to expand the Egyptian Delta and construct housing and farmlands westwards to increase Egypt's food sufficiency and general agricultural production.

==== Opinion polls ====
In an August 2014 poll by Egypt's Baseera, the Centre for Public Opinion Research, eight percent were unhappy with Sisi's performance and ten percent said they could not identify their position. 78 percent said they would vote for Sisi should the presidential elections were held the next day, while 11 percent said they would not. Eighty-nine percent said that there was improvement in the security situation after Sisi's taking office. Seventy-three percent said that fuel has become regularly available since Sisi's election. 35 percent of respondents believed price controls had improved, while 32 percent believed that they have become worse. Twenty-nine percent of the respondents did not see any change, and three percent were undecided.

An April 2016 poll by Baseera after 22 months in office, indicated that Sisi garnered 79% approval rating. 8% were undecided and 13% disapprove of the president's performance. These numbers indicate a moderate drop from the last poll done in 2014.

In October 2016, Baseera conducted a poll that reports that 68% of respondents support Sisi, a 14% fall from the August poll. It included that the reason for the fall was the ongoing price hikes.

An October 2016 survey by Princeton University scholars found that "roughly 58% of respondents hold positive implicit attitudes toward Sisi".

=== Foreign policy ===
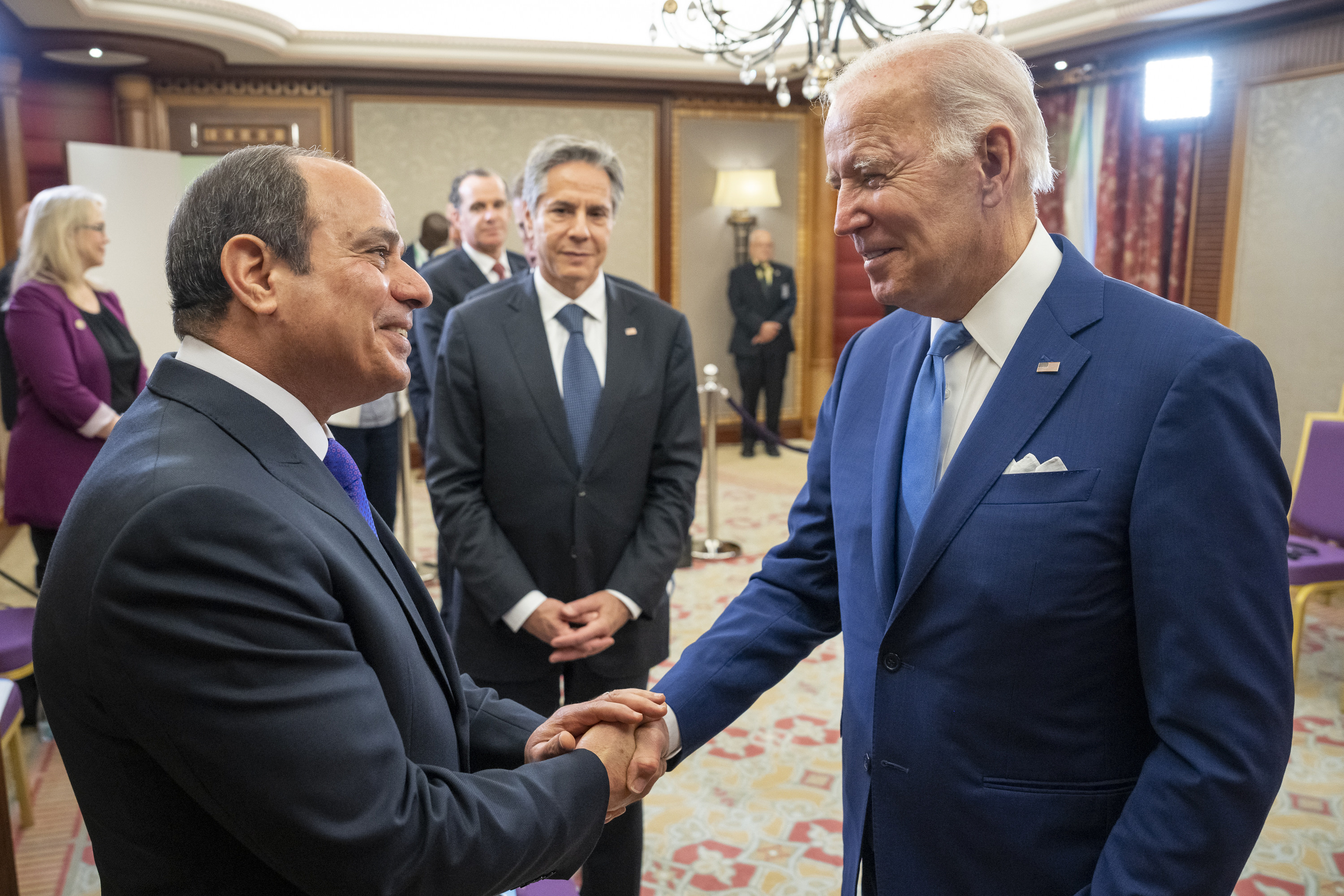
Sisi with U.S. President Joe Biden at the GCC+3 summit in Jeddah, Saudi Arabia, 16 July 2022

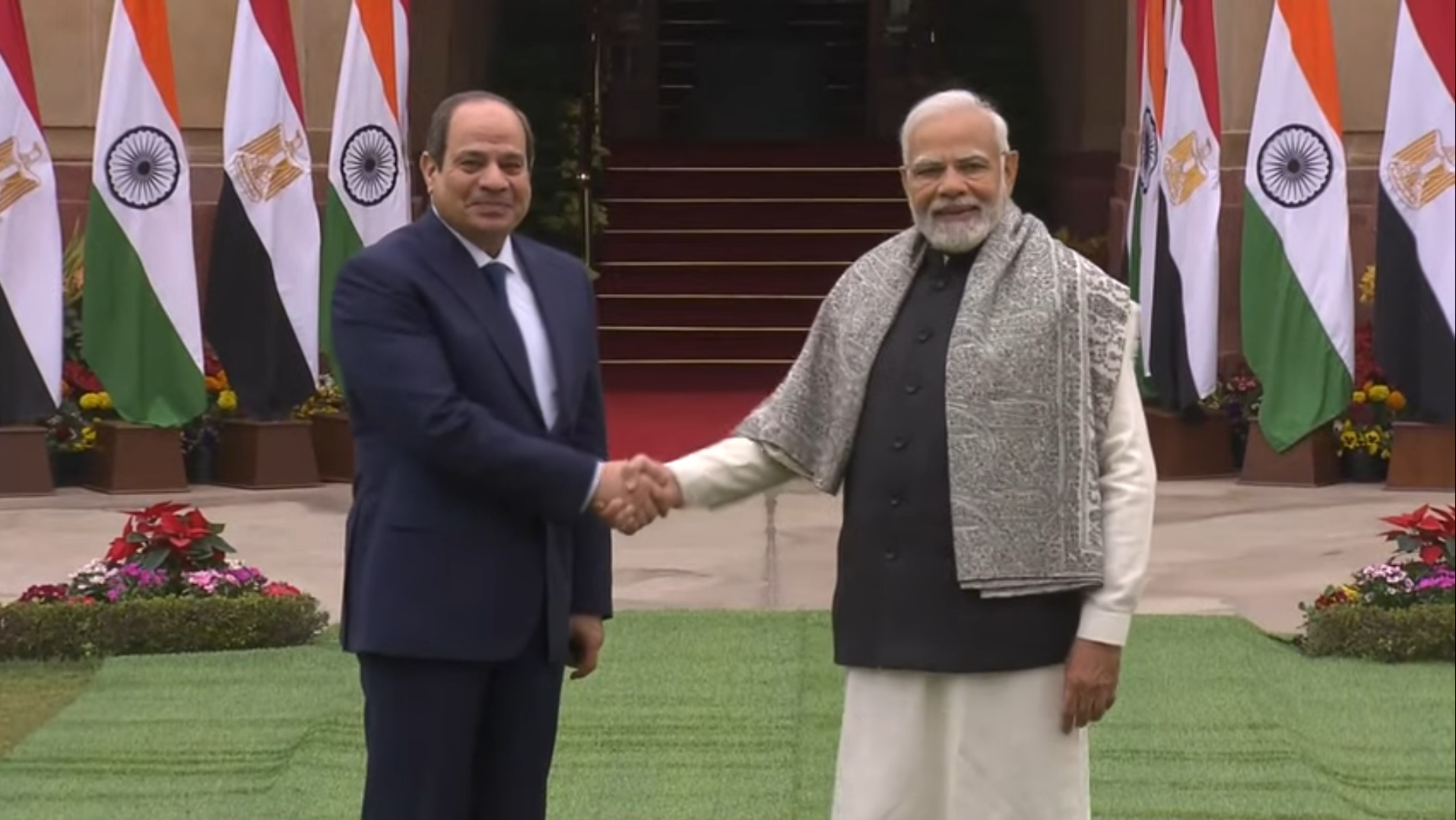
Sisi with Indian PM Narendra Modi at the Hyderabad House in India, 25 January 2023

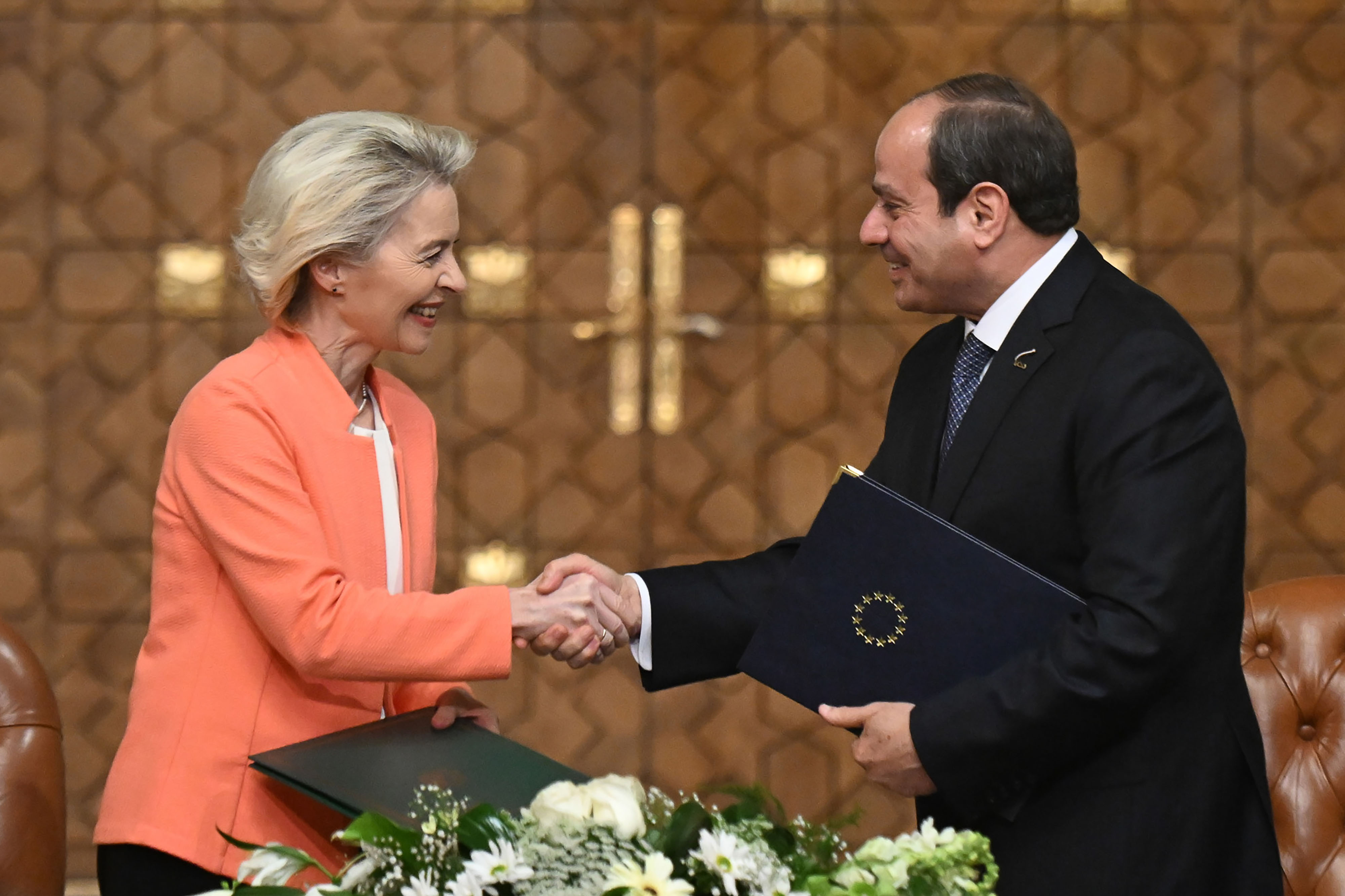
Sisi and European Commission President Ursula von der Leyen, 17 March 2024

==== Africa ====
In his first foreign visit since taking office, Sisi took a tour to fellow North African country Algeria, seeking support to counter Islamist insurgencies in North Africa. Shortly before Sisi arrived in Malabo, Equatorial Guinea to participate in the 23rd ordinary session of the African Union summit where he gave his speech blaming the AU for freezing Egypt's membership a year before. Sisi also announced the establishment of an Egyptian partnership agency for Africa's development. He also concluded the tour with a few hours' visit to Sudan.

The dispute between Egypt and Ethiopia over the Grand Ethiopian Renaissance Dam escalated in 2021. Sisi warned: "I am telling our brothers in Ethiopia, let's not reach the point where you touch a drop of Egypt's water, because all options are open."

==== Israel and Palestine ====
Relations with Israel improved significantly following Mohamed Morsi's removal, with Sisi saying that he had talked to Israel's prime minister, Benjamin Netanyahu, "a lot". Sisi was described by The Economist as "the most pro-Israeli Egyptian leader ever". With continuous support for Palestine, the Sisi administration supports the two-state solution establishing a Palestinian state on lands that were occupied in 1967 with East Jerusalem as its capital which would resolve the Israeli–Palestinian conflict while achieving some of the Palestinian demands and granting Israel the security it wants.

The first months of Sisi's presidency witnessed the 2014 Gaza War. Egypt also criticised the IDF operation in the Gaza Strip as "oppressive policies of mass punishment rejecting 'the irresponsible Israeli escalation' in the occupied Palestinian territory, which comes in the form of 'excessive' and unnecessary use of military force leading to the death of innocent civilians". It also demanded Israel adopt self-restraint and to keep in mind that being an "occupation force", it has a legal and moral duty to protect civilian lives.

After Egypt proposed an initiative for a ceasefire later accepted by Israel and rejected by Hamas, the Sisi administration urged the world to intervene and stop the crisis when it stated that its ceasefire efforts have been met with "obstinacy and stubbornness". Egypt hosted several meetings with both Israeli and Palestinian officials in Cairo to mediate a ceasefire. President Sisi also ordered the Egyptian Armed Forces to transport 500 tons of aid, consisting of food and medical supplies, to Palestinians in the Gaza Strip. A statement was also released by the military saying that Egypt is pursuing its efforts to "stop the Israeli aggression on the Gaza Strip" under the president's supervision. The War ended with an Egyptian-brokered ceasefire on 26 August 2014.

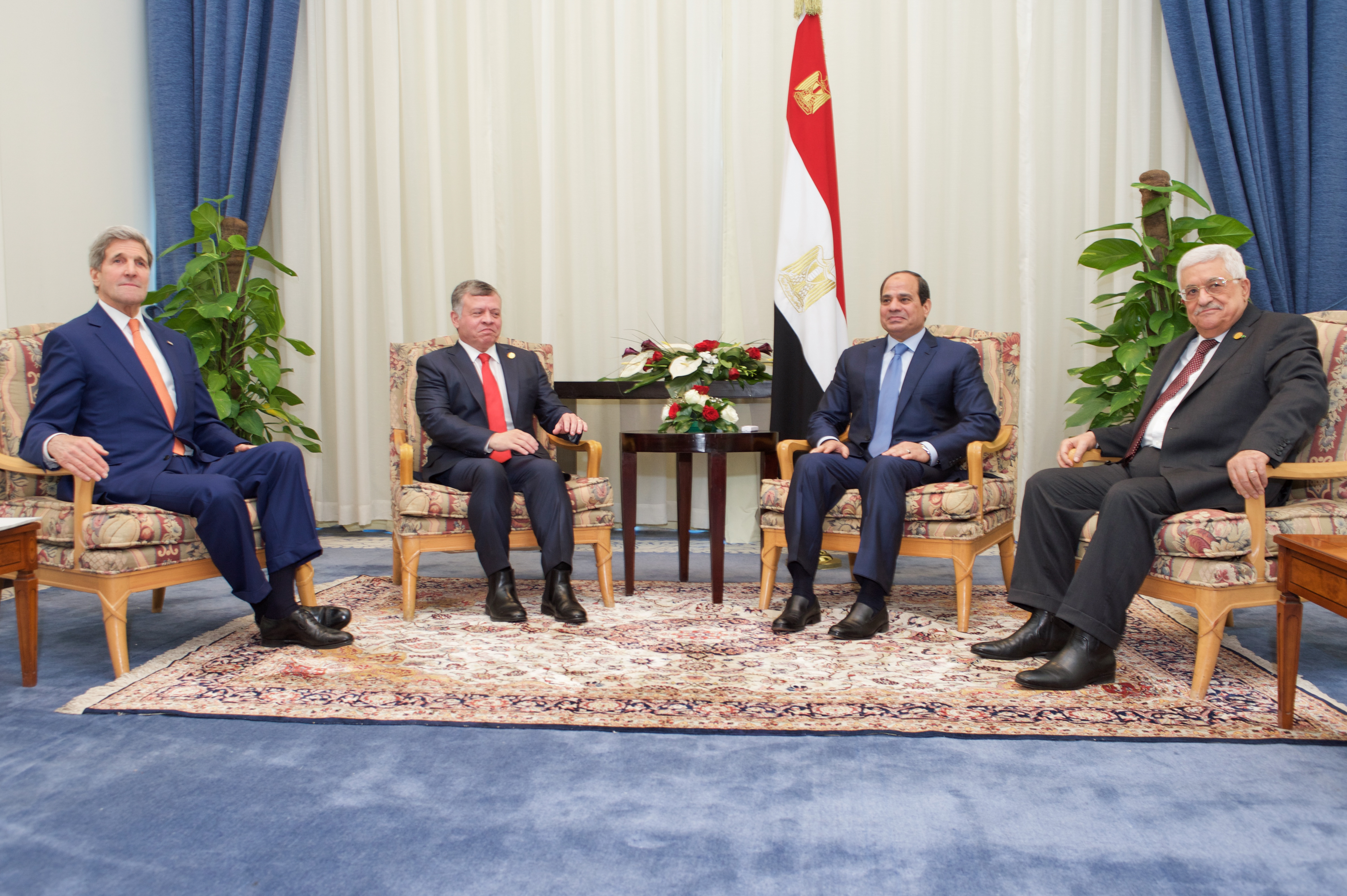
U.S. Secretary of State John Kerry, King Abdullah II of Jordan, Egyptian President Sisi, and Palestinian Authority President Mahmoud Abbas sit together at the Congress Center in Sharm el-Sheikh, Egypt, on 13 March 2015

Egypt hosted the international donor conference in Cairo aiming to raise 4 billion (3.2 billion euros) to reconstruct the Gaza Strip. Sisi described the 2014 Gaza War as a great chance to end the 66-year-old conflict calling on Israel to reach a peace deal with the Palestinians and saying "I call on the Israeli people and the government: now is the time to end the conflict ... so that prosperity prevails, so that we all can have peace and security."

Sisi mainly blames the Israeli–Palestinian conflict for the extremism in the Middle East describing it as a "fertile environment for the growth and spread of extremism, violence and terrorism". Sisi promised that Egypt would guarantee that Palestine would not violate the peace treaty, when reached expressing Egypt's willingness to deploy Egyptian observer forces in the Palestinian Authority in the West Bank and Gaza Strip.

Sisi also stipulated that the Palestinian Authority would take power in the Gaza Strip in future peace plans and conditioned an easing of transit restrictions at the Rafah checkpoint on the presence of a force from the Palestinian Authority's Presidential Guard being stationed on the Gaza side of the crossing as the Sisi administration considers Hamas an enemy, blaming them for the killing of 16 Egyptian soldiers in 2012 and over the alleged involvement in the prisons' storming in the wake of Egyptian Revolution of 2011.

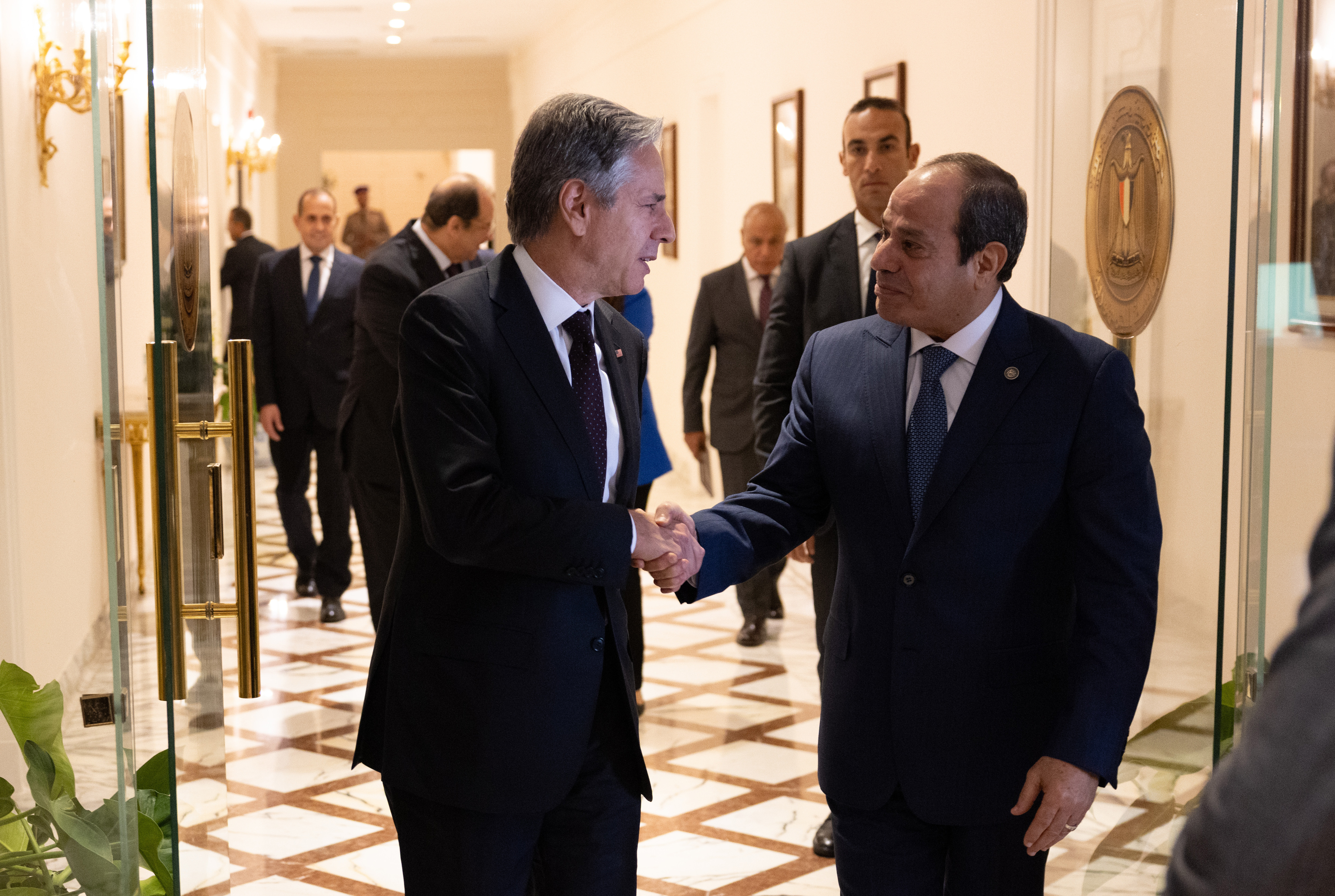
Sisi and US Secretary of State Antony Blinken discuss the Gaza ceasefire in Cairo, 18 September 2024

In January 2020, in response to the Trump peace plan, the Sisi government issued a statement stating that it "recogniz[ed] the importance of considering the U.S. administration's initiative", that it "call[ed] on the two relevant parties to undertake a careful and thorough consideration of the U.S. vision to achieve peace" and supporting the "restor[ation] to the Palestinian people [of] their full legitimate rights through the establishment of a sovereign independent state in the Palestinian occupied territories in accordance with international legitimacy and resolutions". Egypt's stance was different to those of Jordan, Syria and Lebanon, which all opposed the plan in January 2020.

Sisi welcomed the Trump-brokered Israel–United Arab Emirates peace agreement, saying he was gladdened by the suspension of Israel's plans to annex parts of the occupied Palestinian territories in the West Bank. He also personally congratulated the Emirate of Abu Dhabi's Crown Prince Mohammed bin Zayed Al Nahyan on the deal.

On 22 March 2022, Sisi met with Mohamed bin Zayed Al Nahyan and Israeli Prime Minister Naftali Bennett. They discussed trilateral relations, the Iran nuclear deal and the Russian invasion of Ukraine.

In October 2023, during the Gaza war, Sisi said that Israel's bombing of Gaza "went beyond the right to self-defence, turning into collective punishment for 2.3 million people in Gaza", On 25 October 2023, Sisi warned that Israel's ground invasion of the Gaza Strip would cause "many, many civilian casualties".

==== Turkey ====
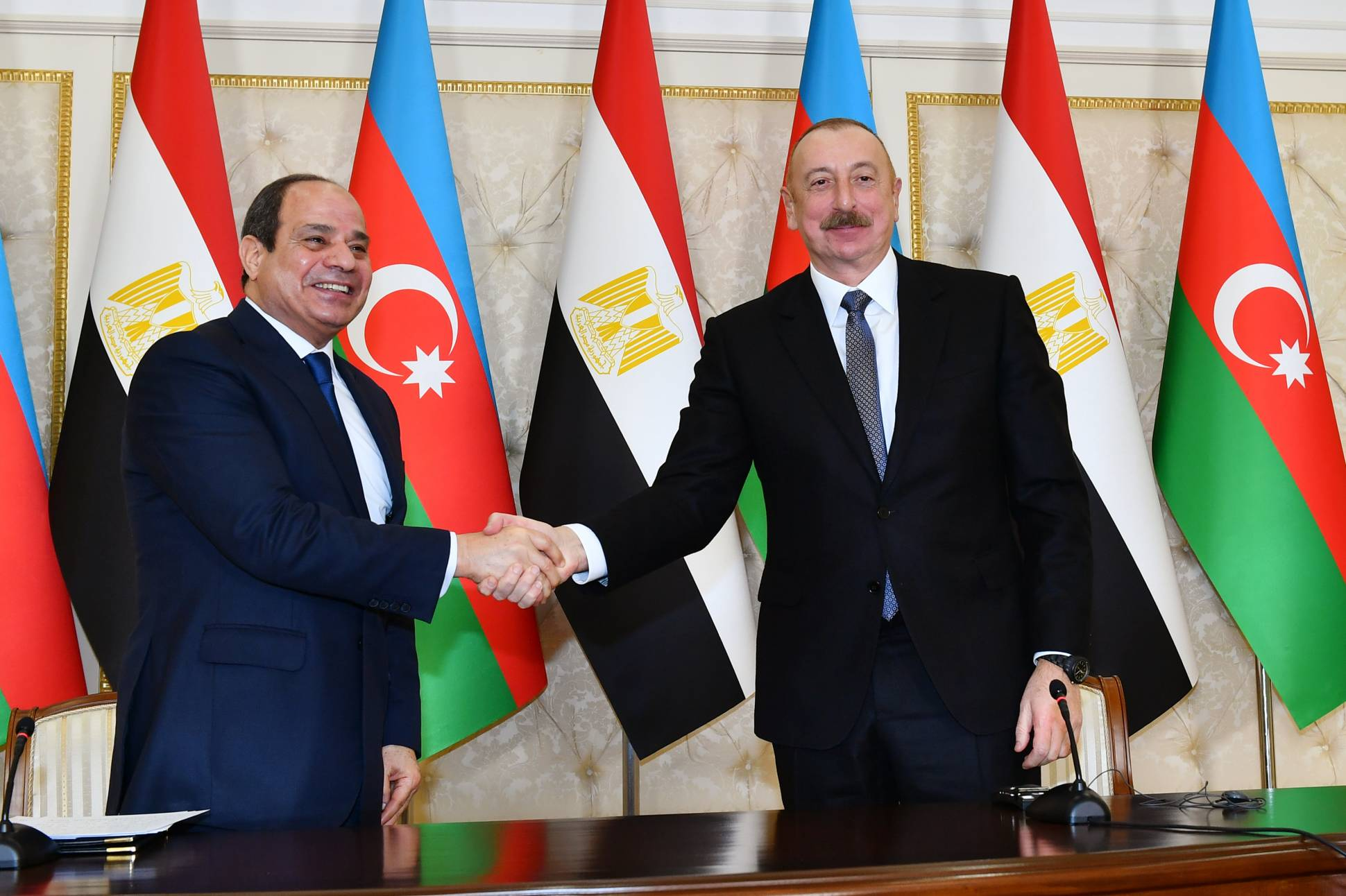
Sisi and Azerbaijan's President Ilham Aliyev, who is a close ally of Turkey, 28 January 2023

Relations between Egypt and Turkey deteriorated significantly after Morsi's ousting. Recep Tayyip Erdoğan, then Prime Minister, was the only major world leader to call Morsi's ouster a coup, calling for the immediate release of Morsi and insisting that he was the legitimate president of Egypt. Turkish Minister for European Affairs Egemen Bagis also called for the UN Security Council to "take action" in Egypt. Erdoğan was said not to recognise Sisi as president of Egypt and called him an "illegitimate tyrant" in response to the 2014 Gaza War and alleged Egyptian support for Israel in its war against Hamas.

In response to Erdoğan's remarks, the Egyptian Foreign Ministry warned that the Egypt–Turkey relationship would be worsened while Sisi refused to respond. Egypt's foreign ministry accused Erdogan of provocation and interfering in Egypt's internal affairs. In November 2013, Egypt told the Turkish ambassador to leave the country, a day after Erdoğan called for Morsi to be freed. Relations with Ankara were lowered to chargé d'affaires. The Egyptian foreign ministry said that Egypt had cancelled joint naval drills with Turkey, over Turkey's interference in Egypt's domestic affairs.

In September 2014, Egypt's foreign minister cancelled a meeting with now-President Erdoğan requested by Turkey after Erdoğan made a speech critical of Egypt in the UN General Assembly. An advisor to the Turkish president denied that the countries' leaders were planning to meet. Sisi's administration also decided to cancel the "roll-on/roll-off" agreement with Turkey, blocking Turkey from transporting Turkish containers to the Gulf via Egyptian ports.

In 2014, an intense campaign started by Egypt and Saudi Arabia against Turkey made it lose its predicted easy victory of membership in the United Nations Security Council. In March 2021, Erdoğan said that Turkey was "keen on strengthening relations with Egypt". Egypt appreciated Turkey's comments, but said that Turkey must turn the chapter and start taking action. Turkey has ordered Muslim Brotherhood-affiliated channels based in the country to calm criticism of Egypt and its president, or even completely stop it.

==== Arab world ====
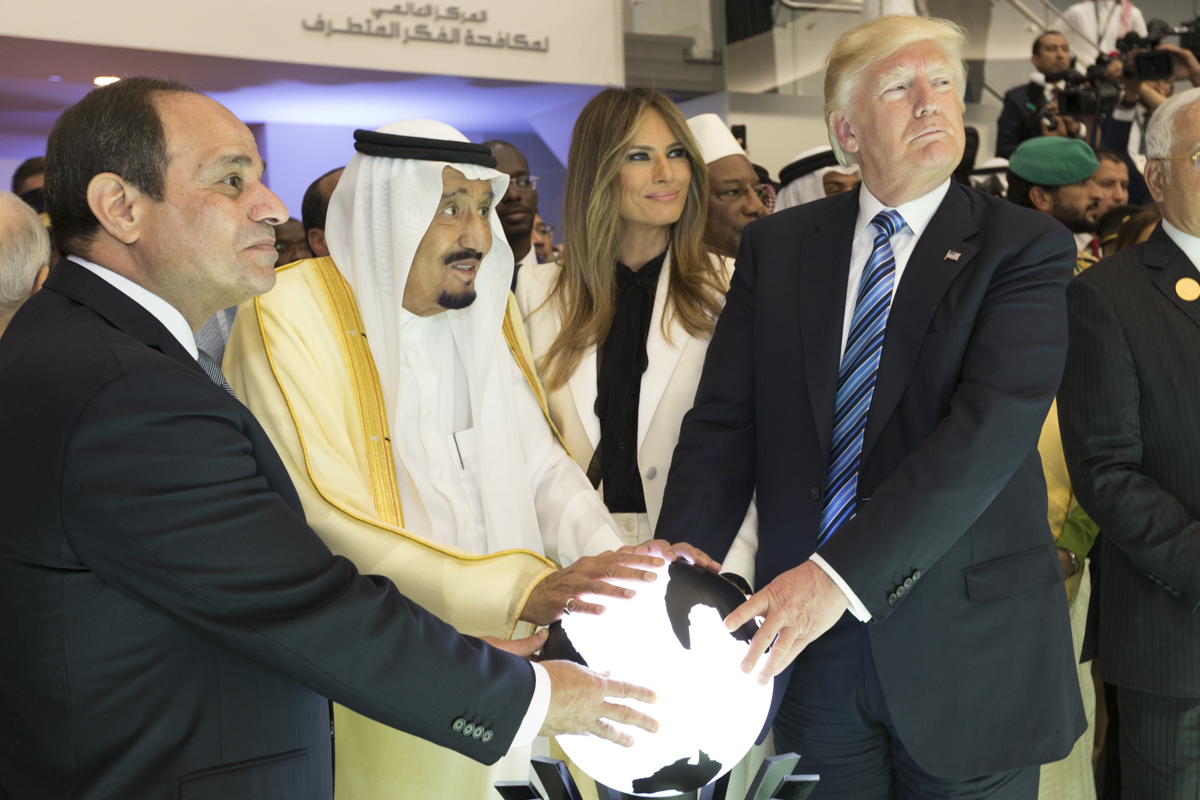
Sisi, King Salman of Saudi Arabia and U.S. President Donald Trump at the 2017 Riyadh summit in Saudi Arabia

Al Jazeera reported in June 2014: "Saudi Arabia, the world's top oil exporter, and its wealthy Gulf Arab partners Kuwait and the United Arab Emirates have given more than $20 billion to help Egypt since Morsi's overthrow, Sisi said last month, and are likely to pledge more." In 2015, Egypt participated in the Saudi Arabian-led military intervention in Yemen.

In April 2016, King Salman of Saudi Arabia made a five-day visit to Egypt, during which the two countries signed economic agreements worth approximately $25 billion and also made an agreement to "return" Tiran and Sanafir, two Egyptian-administered islands in the Gulf of Aqaba, to Saudi control. The announcement of the transfer of the islands provoked a backlash in both social media and traditional media, including outlets which had been firmly pro-Sisi.

In January 2017, an Egyptian court gave its final ruling rejecting the controversial government transfer of the two islands to Saudi Arabia. The Supreme Constitutional Court froze that ruling and allowed Sisi to ratify the deal with Saudi Arabia, making these two islands included in Mohammed Bin Salman's NEOM megacity. In November 2016, Sisi said that he supported the presidency of Bashar al-Assad in Syria for the sake of stability.

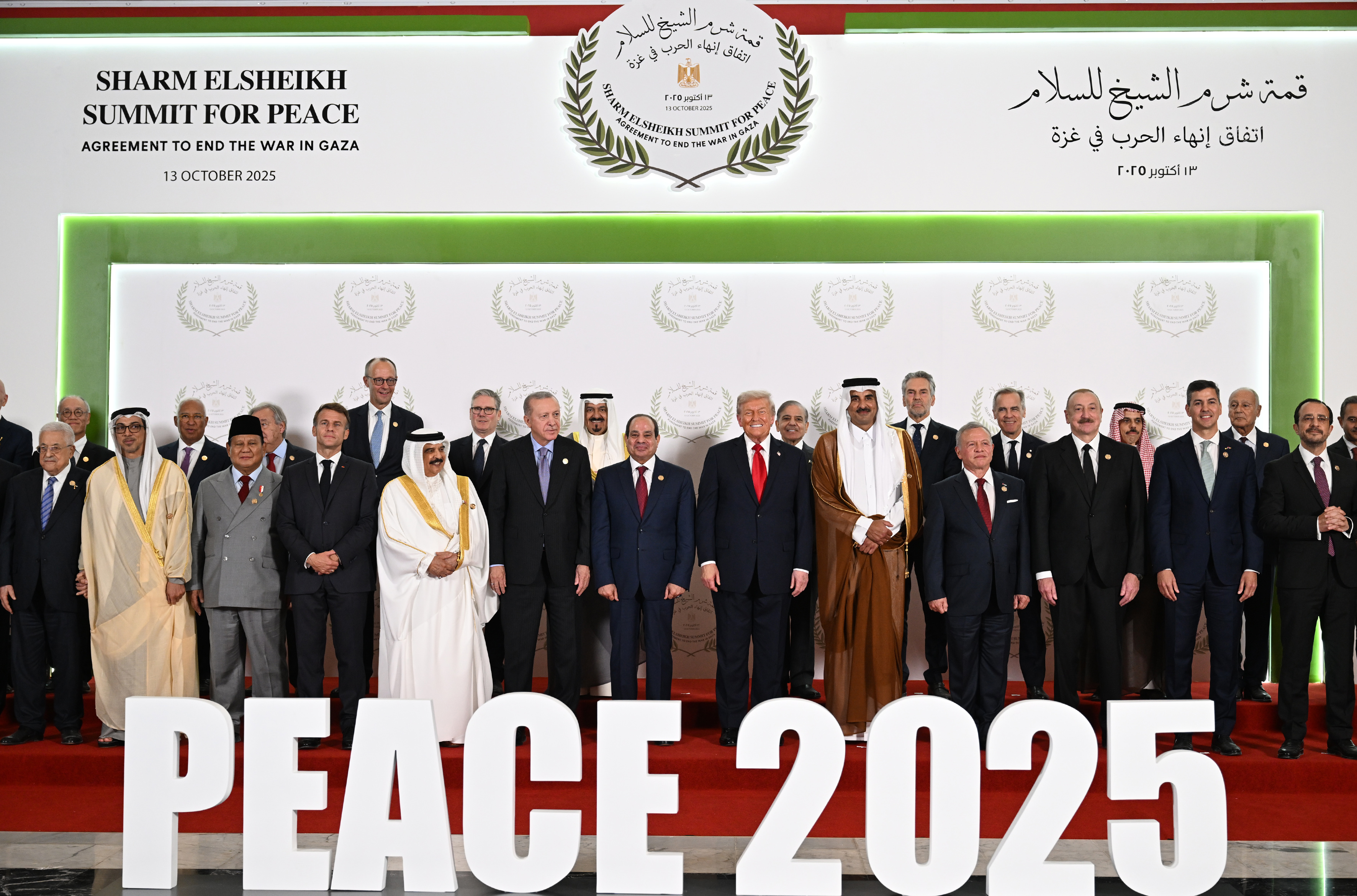
Sisi at the Gaza peace summit in Sharm El Sheikh, Egypt, 13 October 2025

In a February 2017 article in Foreign Affairs, Oren Kessler, the Deputy Director for Research at the Foundation for Defense of Democracies, suggests that there are three reasons for Sisi's pro-Assad position: Egypt's common enemies with Syria (ISIS and the Muslim Brotherhood) as opposed to Saudi Arabia's antagonism with Iran; Egypt and Syria's shared opposition to the policies of President Erdoğan of Turkey; and Egypt's growing relations with Russia, a close ally of Syria. Kessler concludes that the sentiment of "revolution fatigue" amplifies Sisi's support for Assad.

On 24 June 2022, Sisi met with Qatar's Emir Tamim bin Hamad Al Thani on his first official visit to Egypt since 2015. They discussed diplomatic and economic relations after Qatar and Egypt had signed investments contracts worth more than US$5 billion in March 2022.

In February 2025, Sisi congratulated Ahmed Al-Sharaa on his appointment as the new President of Syria by armed factions. El-Sisi wished Al-Sharaa success in fulfilling the aspirations of the Syrian people. Al-Sharaa, described as an Islamist and former affiliate of Al-Qaeda, has been seeking support from Arab and Western leaders since leading a rebel offensive that ousted former Syrian President Bashar al-Assad in 2024.

Following U.S.-Israeli strikes on Iran and subsequent Iranian retaliation against Gulf states, Sisi condemned the attacks on Arab nations and warned of the risk of regional chaos.

==== Russia ====
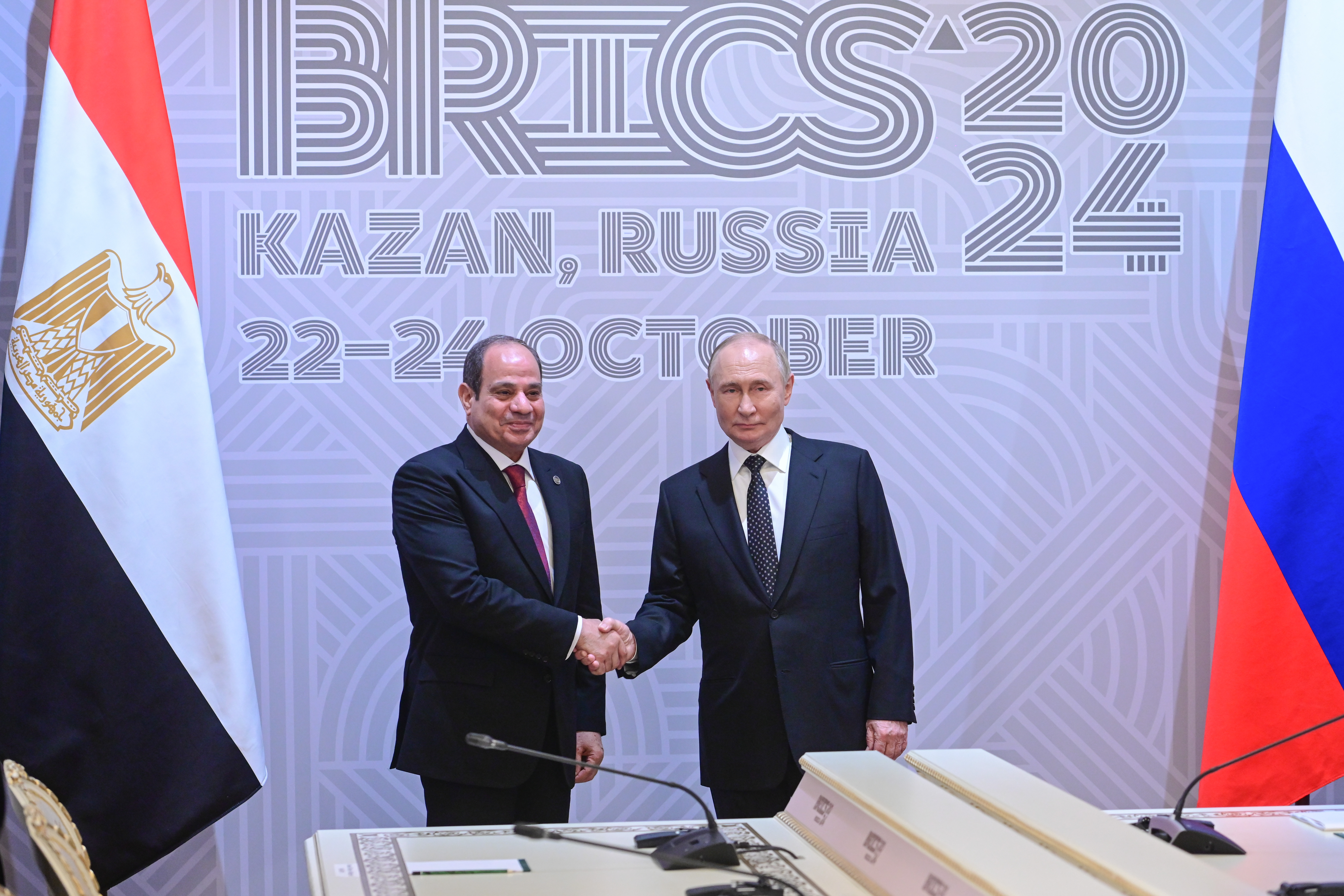
President Sisi with President Vladimir Putin during the 16th BRICS Summit in Kazan, Russia, 22 October 2024

Both military and political relations between Egypt and Russia witnessed significant improvements after Morsi's overthrow, coinciding with the deterioration in relations between Egypt and the United States, which was once considered its important ally in the Middle East. Unlike the US, Russia supported Sisi's actions from the start, including his presidential bid. Russia reportedly offered Egypt a huge military weapons deal after the US had suspended some military aid and postponed weapons delivery to Egypt. The Russian President Vladimir Putin was the first to congratulate Sisi on his inauguration. Sisi made Russia his first destination abroad as defence minister after being promoted to the rank of Field Marshal where he met with the Russian President Vladimir Putin and the Russian Minister of Defense General Sergei Shoigu to negotiate an arms deal with Russia instead of the United States.

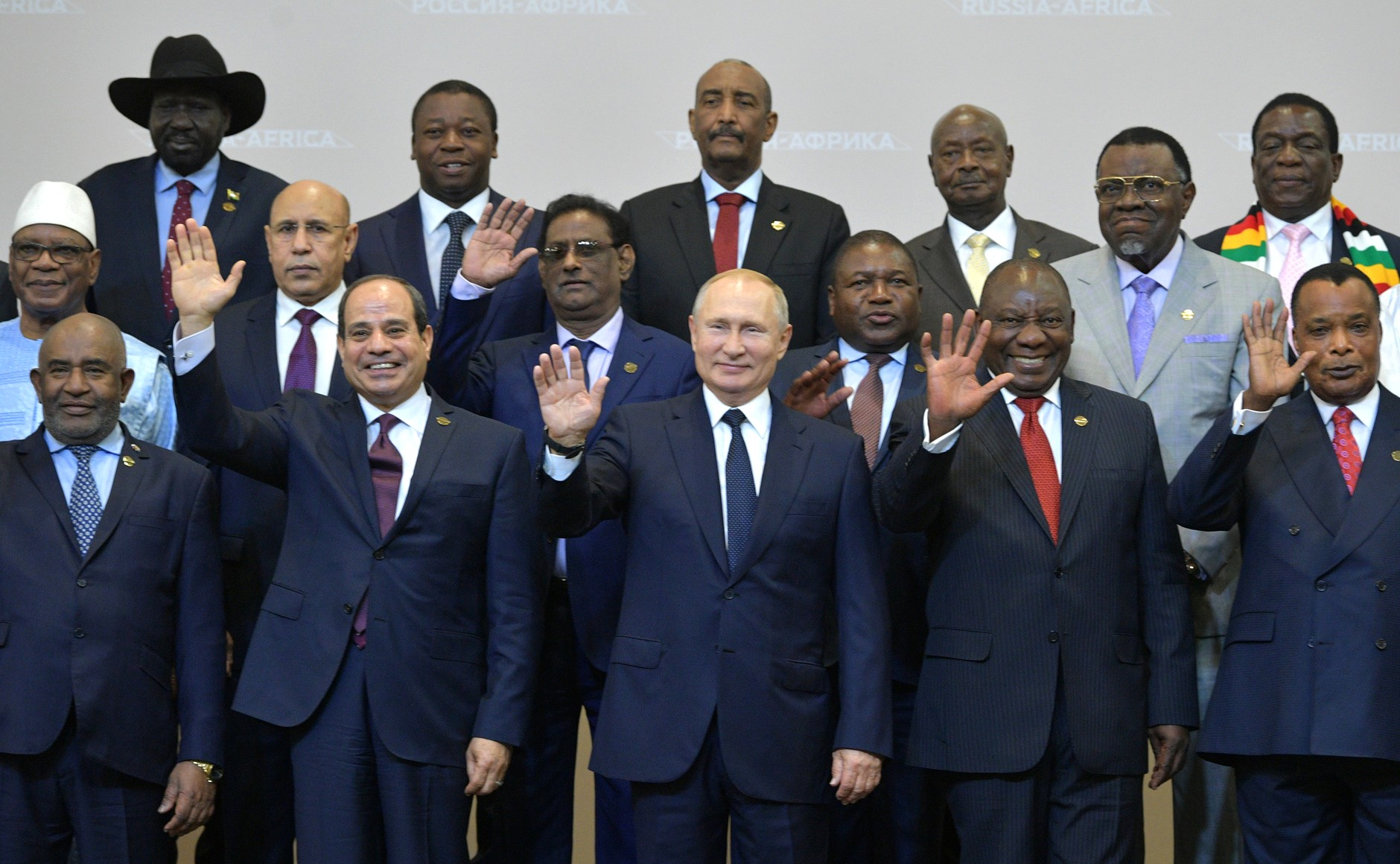
Sisi and Putin at the Russia–Africa Summit in Sochi, 24 October 2019

Sisi also visited Russia as President at Putin's invitation. The visit was described by Putin as reflective of "the special nature" of the relation between the two countries. Sisi was welcomed by General Sergei Shoigu who showed him different Russian-made military vehicles and weapons. Moscow's Vedemosti business daily reported that Russia and Egypt are nearing a $3 billion (2.2 billion euro) weapons agreement.

President Putin also accompanied him on a visit to the Russian cruiser Moskva before they gave a joint televised statement. Sisi announced in his statement that there was a new plan of "renewing and developing" giant projects established by the former Soviet Union. President Putin announced an agreement to provide Egypt with 5 to 5.5 million tons of wheat and to increase Egypt's supply of agricultural goods to Russia by 30 percent. In addition, a free trade zone was also discussed.

On 11 December 2017, during President Vladimir Putin's visit to Cairo, the two countries signed agreements in which Russia would build Egypt's first nuclear reactor, and supply nuclear fuel. It was also agreed that a "Russian Industrial Zone" would be built along the Suez Canal, explained by Putin as being "the biggest regional center for producing Russian products onto the markets of the Middle-East and North Africa". In July 2023, Sisi attended the 2023 Russia–Africa Summit in Saint Petersburg and met with Vladimir Putin.

==== United States ====
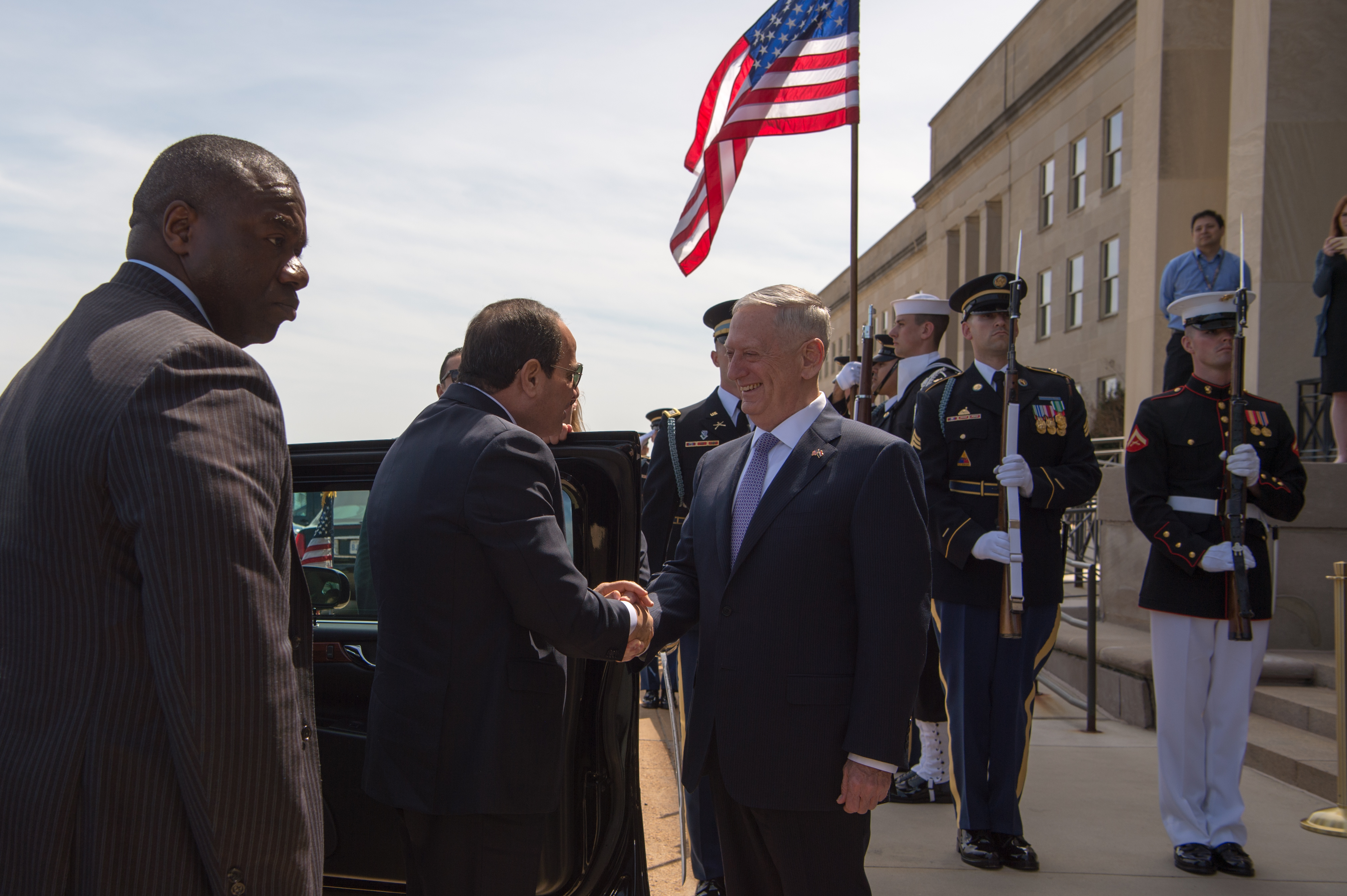
US Defense Secretary Jim Mattis meets with President Abdel Fattah Sisi during a meeting held at the Pentagon in Washington.

Relations between Egypt and the United States witnessed tensions after the overthrow of Mohamed Morsi. The United States under the Obama administration strongly condemned Sisi's administration on several occasions before deciding to delay selling four F-16 fighter jets, Apaches and Abrams' kits to Egypt. The US also cancelled the Bright Star joint military exercise with the Egyptian Armed Forces.

Sisi's administration called on Barack Obama's administration to exercise restraint in dealing with "racially charged" unrest in Ferguson, echoing language the US used to caution Egypt previously as it cracked down on Islamist protesters. Egyptian security checked US Secretary of State John Kerry and his top aides with a stationary metal detector and a handheld wand before their meeting with Sisi in what was considered an unusual screening for a senior State Department official. Sisi also skipped President Obama's invitation to the American-African summit.

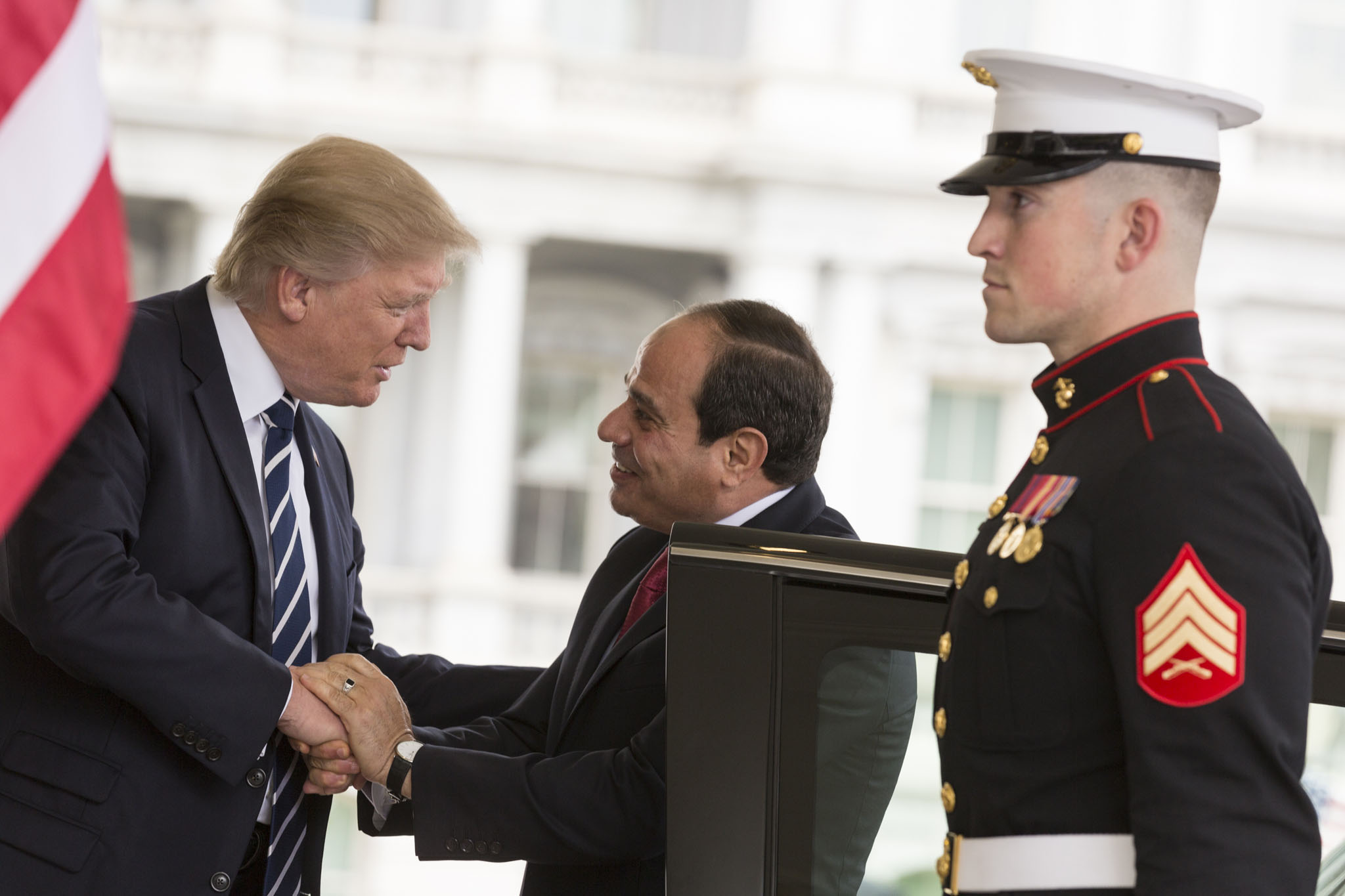
US President Donald Trump welcomes Sisi, 3 April 2017

Despite evidence of tensions, a 2014 news story, BBC reported: "The US has revealed it has released $575m in military aid to Egypt that had been frozen since the ousting of President Mohammed Morsi last year." In September 2014 Sisi visited the US to address the UN General assembly in New York. An extensive media campaign produced billboards which were distributed all over New York City, welcoming the Egyptian president. In August 2015, Secretary of State John Kerry was in Cairo for a "U.S.-Egypt strategic dialogue".

Following the election of Republican Donald Trump as the president of the United States, the two countries looked to improve the Egyptian-American relations. Sisi and Trump had met during the opening of the seventy-first session of the United Nations General Assembly in September 2016. The absence of Egypt in President Trump's travel ban towards seven Muslim countries was noted in Washington, although the Congress has voiced human rights concerns over the handling of dissidents.

On 22 March 2017, it was reported that Sisi would be travelling to Washington to meet with Trump on 3 April 2017. Trump praised Sisi, saying that Sisi had "done a tremendous job under trying circumstance". On 26 August 2019, Trump met with Sisi, along with other global leaders, in the 45th G7 summit in Biarritz, France. Trump continued his earlier praise of Sisi, saying that "Egypt has made tremendous progress under a great leader's leadership". At the conference, Trump referred to Sisi as his "favorite dictator".

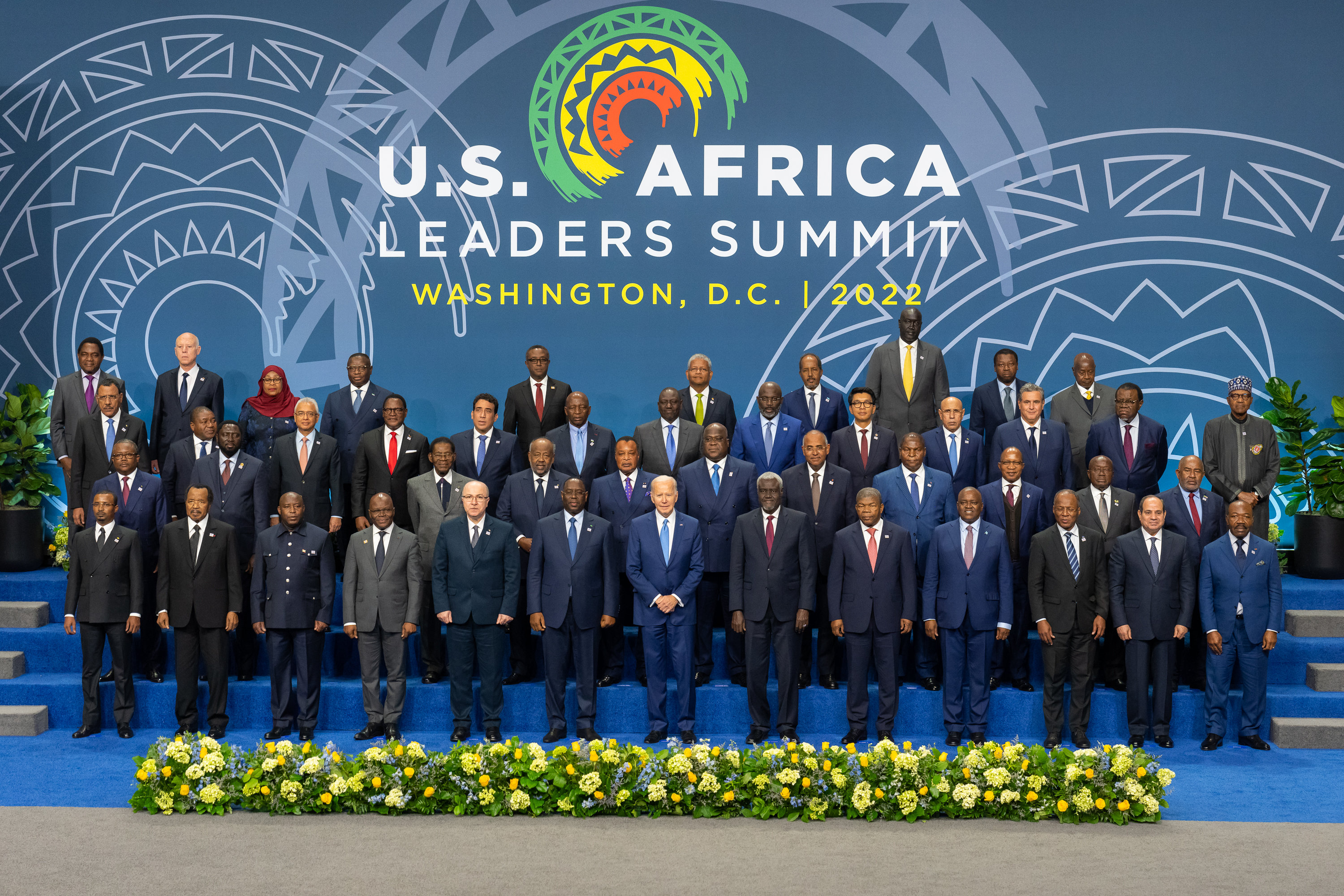
Sisi and US President Joe Biden at the United States–Africa Leaders Summit in Washington, December 2022

Sisi criticized Donald Trump's decision to recognize Jerusalem as Israel's capital. According to Sisi, the Trump administration's decision "would undermine the chances of peace in the Middle East".

The Biden administration pressed Sisi to improve Egypt's human rights record—which is generally perceived to be poor—but nonetheless approved in February 2021 a $197 million sale of Rolling Airframe Missiles for the Egyptian Navy's coastal defences, citing the country's role in regional security as a major non-NATO ally.

=== Political opposition ===
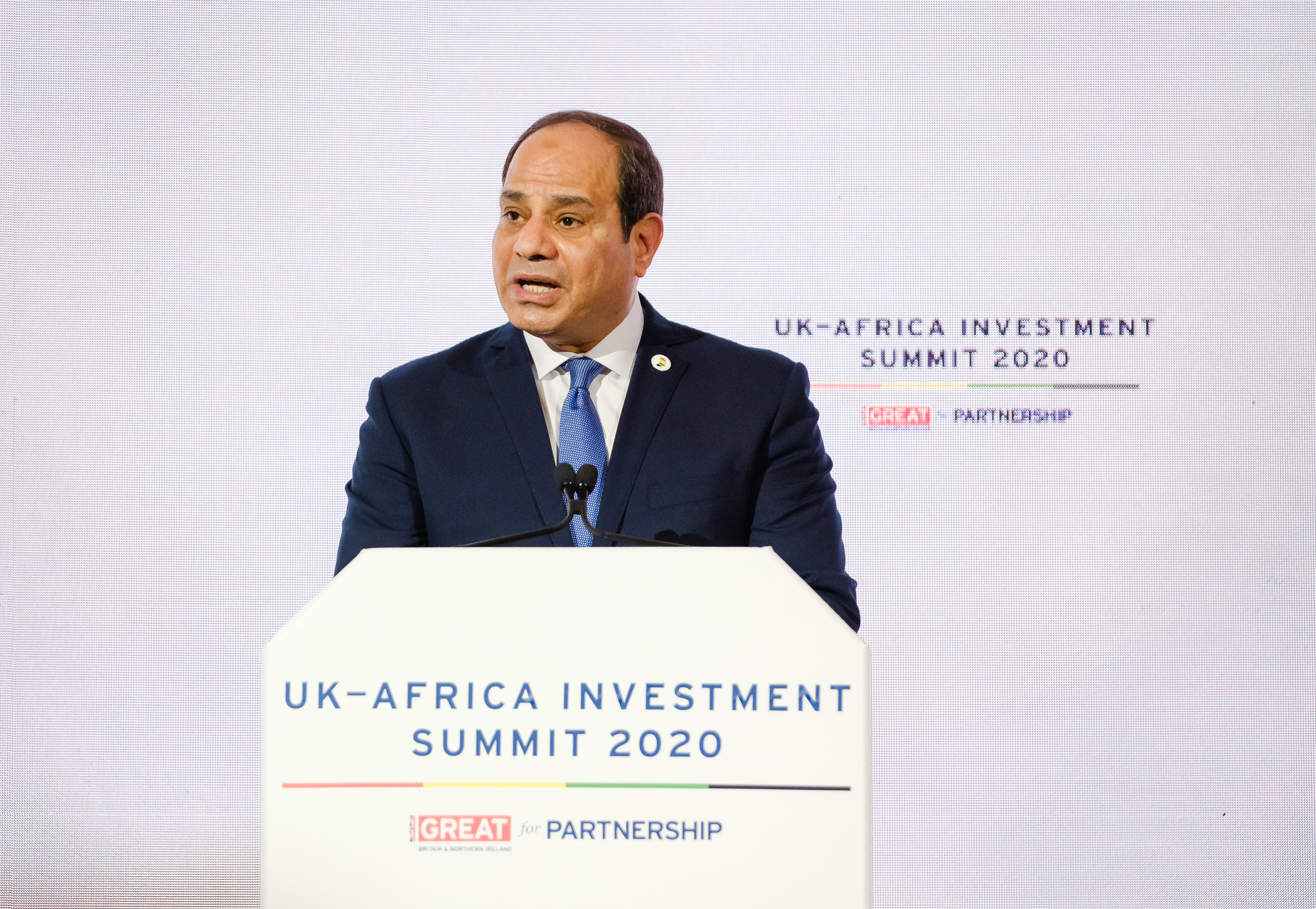
President Sisi speaking at the UK-Africa Investment Summit in London, 2020

In September 2019, building contractor Mohamed Ali, in exile in Spain, published videos online that directly criticised Sisi, claiming corruption and ineffectiveness. Ali's videos led to protests in 2019, which Sisi responded to in several speeches. The protests were dispersed by police shortly afterward, leading to the arrests of more than 4,000 protestors.

In November 2019, member of the House of Representatives Ahmed Tantawi submitted a formal parliamentary proposal and a YouTube video online for Sisi to finish his term in 2022 rather than 2024, and for consultation on institutional reforms to take place, to allow change to take place by political methods. Tantawi also announced his candidacy against Sisi in the 2023 Egyptian presidential election, but as a result of Tantawi not getting enough endorsements, he withdrew from the elections.

On 28 December 2019, Mohamed Ali released the "Egyptian Consensus Document" with a list of four key principles and four key actions for replacing Sisi's system of government, which Ali claimed represented the consensus of a wide range of the Egyptian opposition. The following day, the Egyptian National Action Group (ENAG) including Ayman Nour as spokesperson was launched, with a similar claim of representing the consensus of a broad array of the Egyptian opposition ("centrists, liberals, leftists [and] Islamists") with a consensus program for replacing Sisi's governmental system.

=== January 25 Revolutionaries Movement ===
The Flag of the Kingdom of Egypt used by the organisation on social media

The January 25 Revolutionaries Movement was a revolutionary movement started in Syria in January 2025 aimed at overthrowing Abdel Fattah el-Sisi. Throughout November and December 2024, the Syrian opposition led by Hay'at Tahrir al-Sham successfully captured Damascus and subsequently ended the rule of Bashar al-Assad, who had good relations with Egyptian president Sisi. The group was founded with the goal of deposing President Sisi and ending his rule over Egypt, similar to what had occurred to his Syrian counterpart.

A prominent figure and leader of the group is Ahmed al-Mansour, an Egyptian national who served in the Hay'at Tahrir al-Sham during the Syrian civil war. On January 15, Mansour was arrested by the Syrian authorities, leaving the movement without a leader and putting into question the future existence of the group

The Israeli N12 has referred to the movement as "Jihadists" and called the creation of the revolutionary movement "in the spirit of the era" referring to the Syrian revolution. An Egyptian pro-Sisi television host, Ahmed Mussa, called the movement a "threat to national security".

=== 2026 Iran War ===
Despite El Sisi maintaining a strong neutral stance on the 2026 Iran War and acting as a mediator between the United States and Iran. Egypt was heavily affected by the conflict, Leading to more economic stagnation and an increase in Fuel prices. On the 29th of July, A drone strike occurred on the port in Damietta with many pointing to Iran being a potential perpetrator despite not claiming responsibility."

Later on October 18th, Following talks between Egypt and Saudi Arabia about the Bab al-Mandab Strait crisis and the broader Houthi–Saudi conflict. The Egyptian House of Representatives had an emergency session regarding support for Saudi Arabia in the Yemeni conflict, With El Sisi pledging full support for the defence of Saudi Arabia against the Houthis"

=== Potential end of term in 2030 ===
Since becoming president in 2014, El Sisi repeatedly won 3 consecutive presidential elections with many critics claiming Voter Fraud and Political corruption as potential causes for his repeated victories. However in October of 2026, El Sisi announced he will be stepping down in 2030 as his current presidential term will expire in the same year, Despite many close people associated to El Sisi hinting at him amending the constitution and running for re-election. Sisi has also outlined a plan for the country's main military academy to train potential future leaders for 30 months, A decision heavily criticized by many for not including any civilians or non-military affiliated individuals. A committee overseen by the speaker of parliament and including intellectuals, politicians and the ministers of higher education and justice, would develop criteria for selecting candidates and draft legislation for the training programme."

== Personal life and public image ==
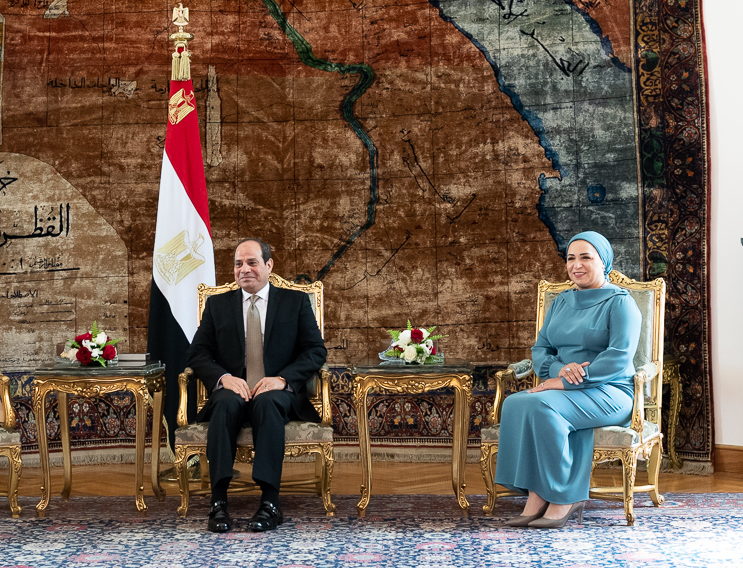
Sisi and his wife Entissar Amer in 2018

Sisi is protective of the privacy of his family, even though two of his sons hold positions in the government. He is married to his cousin Entissar Amer, and is the father of three sons and one daughter. His son Mahmoud is married to the daughter of former Egyptian army chief Mahmoud Hegazy.

Sisi comes from a religious family and frequently quotes Quranic verses during informal conversations; Sisi's wife wears the hijab. Sisi is known to be quiet and is often called the Quiet General. Even as a young man he was often called "General Sisi" due to his perceived orderly demeanor.

According to Sherifa Zuhur, a professor at the War College, when Sisi attended, many American officers expressed doubts that Muslims could be democratic. Sisi disputed this opinion; he and others were critical of decisions made in Iraq and Libya. Sisi wrote his term paper at the War College on democracy and its applications in the Middle East. In his paper, he argues in favor of democracy based on its past successes. Zuhur also had the impression that Sisi supported a gradual move towards pluralism. While at the War College, Sisi sometimes led Friday prayers at the local mosque.

Sisi described himself as "a doctor whose diagnoses are sought after by top philosophers and prominent world leaders". Upon his ascension to the presidency, Sisi's public persona was characterized by British newspaper The Guardian as one marked by "calmness and piety with a mixture of austerity and warmth".

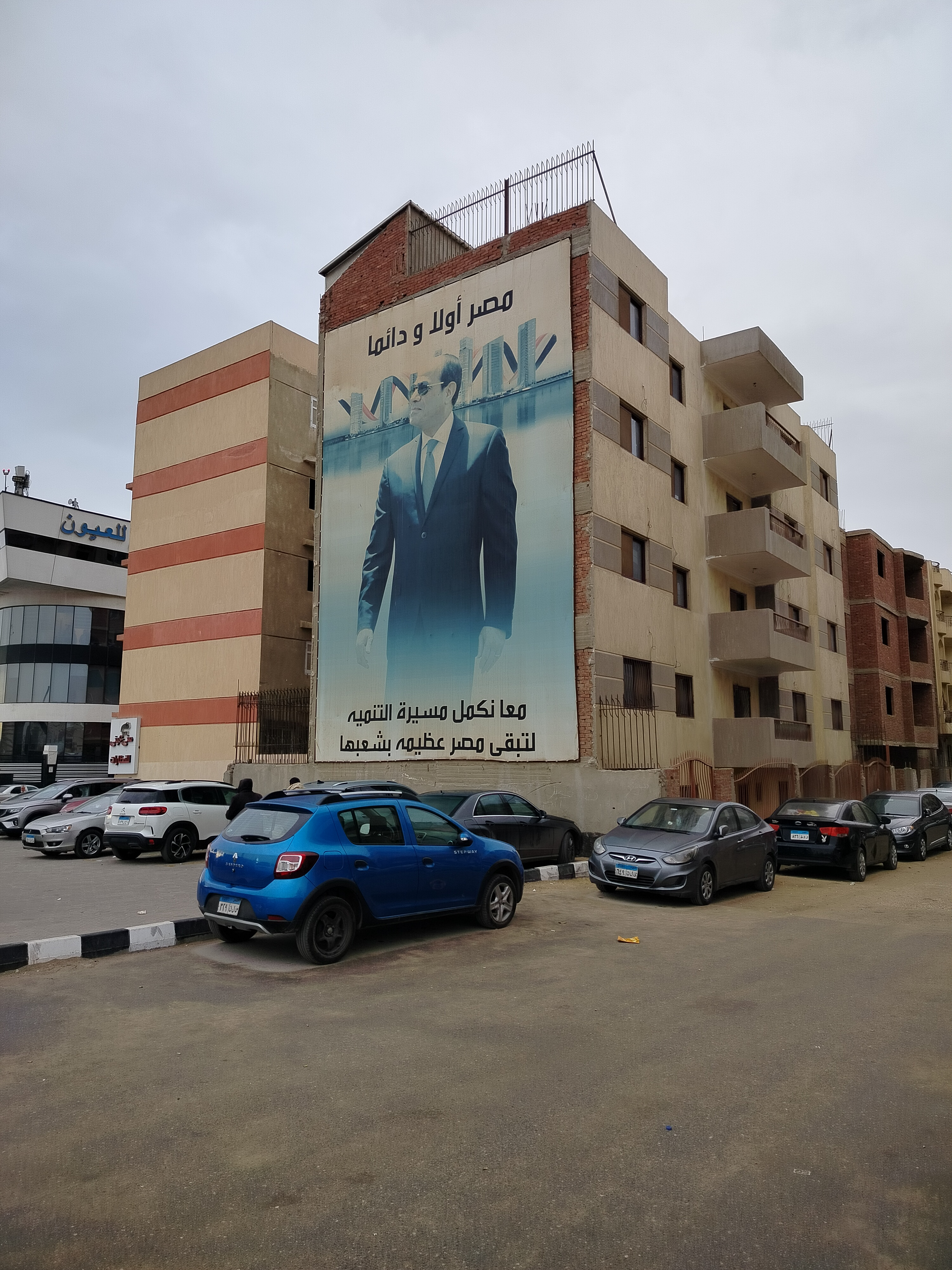
Pro-Sisi billboard in Cairo. The text translates to "Egypt is and always is first, together we continue the development path to make Egypt prosperous with its people."

In 2013, Sisi became one of the most popular political figures in Egypt. Since becoming president his popularity has slowly decreased, with him being labelled authoritarian by several individuals. His economic policies, including the increasing price of the United States dollar, first in late 2016, then in the 2020s has been scrutinised. Sisi's handling of the Gaza war has also been criticised by some figures, specifically his refusal to let Palestinian refugees enter Egypt.

His administration was scrutinized even more during the Global March to Gaza movement in June 2025, when Egyptian border guards got into violent clashes with them after refusing their entry, attracting further criticism internationally and domestically. Sisi has been nicknamed "the Mexican" by Egyptians critical of his leadership, owing to the similarity between his name and the word "El-Meksiki", and also in reference to Joe Biden erroneously calling Sisi the president of Mexico.

== Electoral history ==
Electoral history of Abdel Fattah el-Sisi
Year	Office	Party	Votes received				Result
Year	Office	Party	Total	%	P.	Swing	Result
2014	President of Egypt	IND	23,780,114	96.91%	1st	—N/a	Won
2018	President of Egypt	IND	21,835,387	97.08%	1st	+0.17	Won
2023	President of Egypt	IND	39,702,451	89.65%	1st	-7.43	Won

== Recognition ==
=== Military ===
- 30 June 2013 Revolution Medal
- 25 January 2011 Revolution Medal
- Silver Jubilee of Liberation of Sinai Medal (2007)
- Golden Jubilee of 23 July 1952 Revolution (2002)
- Silver Jubilee of October War 1973 Medal (1998)
- Longevity and Exemplary Service Medal
- October War 1973 Medal (1973)
- Kuwait Liberation Medal
- Kuwait Liberation Medal (Egypt)
- Liberation of Sinai Decoration (1982)
- Distinguished Service Decoration
- Military Duty Decoration, Second Class
- Military Duty Decoration, First Class
- Military Courage Decoration
- Republic's Military Decoration
- Training Decoration
- Army Day Decoration

=== Civil ===
- Bahrain: Collar of the Order of Sheikh Isa bin Salman Al Khalifa, 8 May 2017
- Belarus: Medal of the Order of the Friendship of Peoples, 18 June 2019
- Cyprus: Grand Cross of the Order of Makarios III, 20 November 2017
- Denmark: Knight of the Order of the Elephant, 6 December 2024
- France: Grand Cross of the Legion of Honour, 7 December 2020
- Greece: Grand Cross of the Order of the Redeemer
- Guinea: Grand Cross of the National Order of Merit, 7 April 2019
- Ivory Coast: Grand Cross of the National Order of the Ivory Coast, 11 April 2019
- KSA: Collar of the Order of Abdulaziz Al Saud
- Kuwait: Collar of the Order of Mubarak the Great, 5 January 2015
- Malaysia: Grand Cordon of the Order of the Crown of the Realm, 10 October 2026
- Mauritania: Grand Cordon of the National Order of Merit
- Oman: Collar of the Order of Oman, 21 May 2023
- Portugal: Grand Collar of the Order of Prince Henry
- Serbia: Grand Cross of the Order of the Republic of Serbia
- Spain: Collar of the Order of Isabella the Catholic, 16 September 2025
- Sudan: Collar of the National Order of Sudan
- United Arab Emirates: Collar of the Order of Zayed
- Arab League: Medal of Arab tourism
- Medal of the Order of St. George from Semperoper (Dresden) (later withdrawn)
- Honorary PhD from National University of Public Service (Budapest)

== Publications ==
- El-Sisi, Abdel Fattah (15 March 2006). Democracy in the Middle East (PDF) (Thesis). U.S. Army War College. Archived from the original (PDF) on 1 May 2016.

== See also ==
- Attempted assassination of Abdel Fattah el‑Sisi in Mecca
- Politics of Egypt
- Gamal Abdel Nasser
- Anwar Sadat
- Post-coup unrest in Egypt (2013–2014)
- Egyptian Crisis (2011–2014)
- Arab Winter

== Notes ==
Government offices
Preceded by Murad Muwafi	Director of Military Intelligence; 2010–2012	Succeeded by Mahmoud Hegazy
Military offices
Preceded by Mohamed Hussein Tantawi	General Commander of the Armed Forces; 2012–2014	Succeeded by Sedki Sobhy
Political offices
Preceded by Mohamed Hussein Tantawi	Minister of Defence; 2012–2014	Succeeded by Sedki Sobhy
Preceded by Momtaz El-Saeed	Deputy Prime Minister of Egypt; 2013–2014	Vacant
Preceded by Adly Mansour; Interim	President of Egypt; 2014–present	Incumbent
Diplomatic posts
Preceded by Paul Kagame	Chairperson of the African Union; 2019–2020	Succeeded by Cyril Ramaphosa
