= National Roads Project =

Infrastructure project in Egypt

The National Roads Project is a large Egyptian infrastructure project initiated by the Egyptian President Abdel Fattah el-Sisi in August 2014. The project is a part of the Egypt Vision 2030.

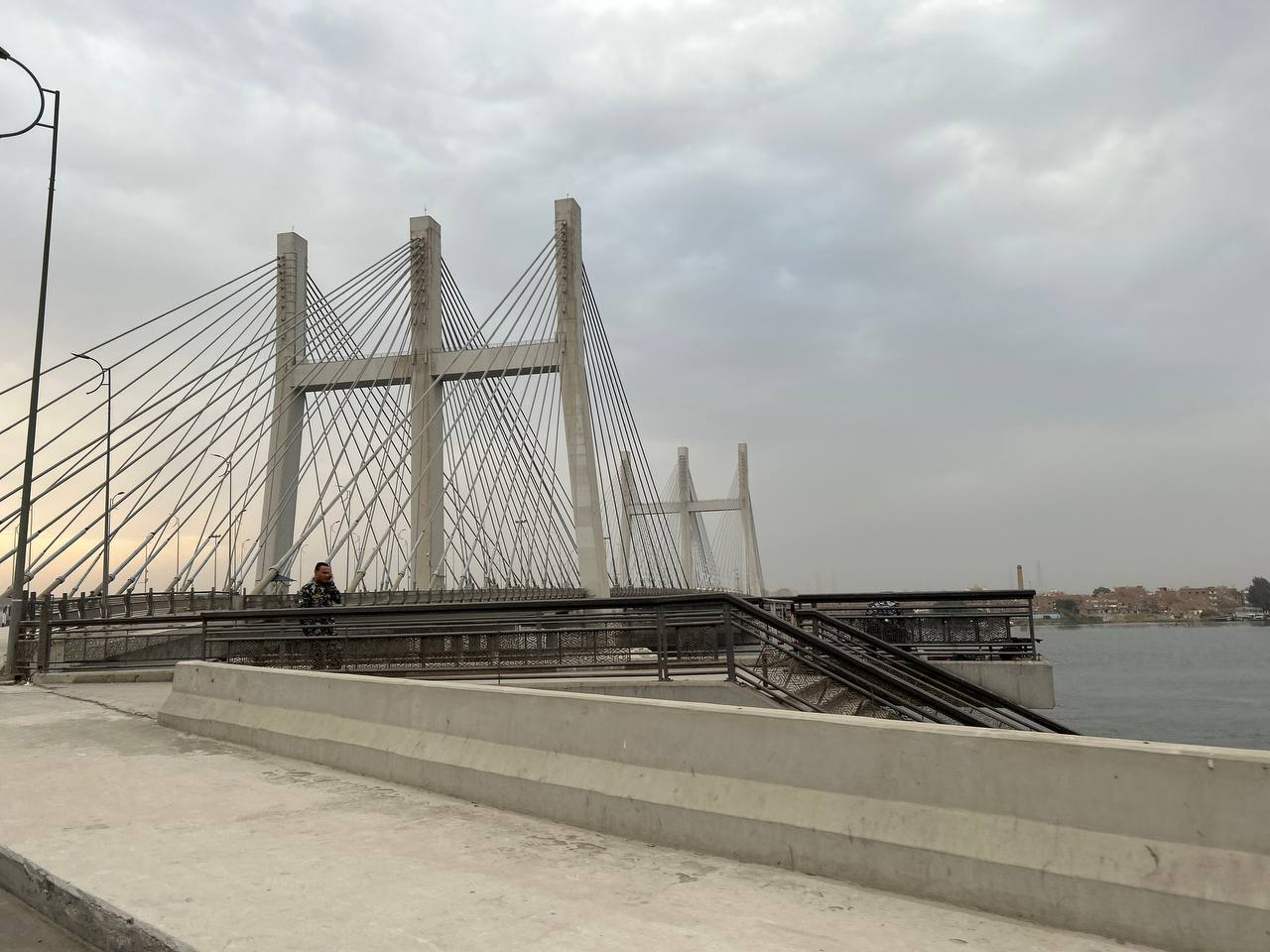
The Tahya Misr Bridge in Cairo.

== Overview ==
A part of Egypt Vision 2030, the project aims sustainable development, linking transportation systems with national economic and social development requirements. It also aims facilitating movement out of the densely populated Nile Valley into new urban, industrial, and agricultural zones in the Red Sea and Western Desert, and also positioning Egypt as a global logistics hub by linking ports to national roads and participating in continental projects like the Cairo-Cape Town Road. After finalizing the project, it is expected to reduce travel times across the country by approximately 23–27% and improving the transportation of goods, which accounts for over 98% of domestic movement.

The project includes the construction of 39 new roadways with a total length of 4,400 km, accounting for around 10% of the total length of all roads in Egypt. The project is expected to be completed within 2 years and cost £E36 billion. Among the planned roads are the Ismailia-Banha (33 km), the Sohag-Red Sea Road (180 km) and the Wadi al-Natrun-Alamein (134 km).

== See also ==
- Egypt Vision 2030
- Egyptian Government
