= Attempted assassination of Abdel Fattah el‑Sisi in Mecca =

Attempted assassination of Abdel Fattah el-Sisi in Mecca
- Part of Terrorism in Egypt
- Date: August 2014 (plot revealed publicly in 2016)
- Location: Mecca, Saudi Arabia
- Type: Alleged bombing plot
- Motive: Jihadist extremism (alleged)
- Target: Abdel Fattah el-Sisi

Members of the Islamic State–affiliated group Sinai Province attempted to assassinate Egyptian President Abdel Fattah el-Sisi during his Umrah pilgrimage in Mecca, Saudi Arabia in 2014. The plot was publicly revealed by Egyptian prosecutors in November 2016 as part of a case involving 292 suspects accused of planning terrorist operations inside and outside Egypt.

== The Mecca plot ==
=== Planning ===
According to prosecutors, the suspects believed el-Sisi would stay at the Swissotel Makkah Clock Tower overlooking the Masjid al-Haram. Members of the cell allegedly purchased materials in Mecca to assemble explosive devices and stored them on the 34th floor of the hotel. The suspected ringleader, identified as Ahmed Bayoumi, reportedly coordinated logistics and surveillance.

=== Suicide component ===
Investigations claimed that the wife of one of the defendants volunteered to wear a suicide belt and detonate it inside the hotel lobby to divert security forces while other members attempted the assassination.

=== Failure of the plot ===
According to prosecutors, the plot did not materialize because el-Sisi did not stay in the targeted hotel.

== Related plot in Egypt ==
Authorities stated that a parallel conspiracy inside Egypt involved dismissed police officers and a dentist who allegedly planned to attack el-Sisi’s motorcade in Cairo.

== Arrests, trial, and sentencing ==
On 20 November 2016, 292 individuals were referred to a military court on charges including membership in Sinai Province and conspiring to assassinate the president.

On 4 February 2019, a military court sentenced eight defendants to death and 32 to life imprisonment. Others received sentences ranging from 3 to 15 years.

On 13 October 2021, Egypt’s High Military Appeals Court upheld life sentences for 32 defendants and reduced two sentences from life to 15 years.

== See also ==
- Sinai insurgency
- Islamic State – Sinai Province
- Abdel Fattah el-Sisi
- Terrorism in Egypt
- Mohammed bin Nayef
