= Ahmed Mussa (presenter) =

Egyptian journalist and television host (born 1961)

- أحمد موسى
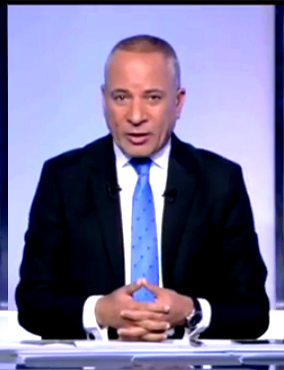
- Born: 10 September 1961 (age 65); Sohag, Egypt
- Education: Sohag University
- Occupation: Presenter
- Spouse: Aya al-Jammal
- Children: Marwan, Mennat Allah

Ahmed Mussa (Arabic: أحمد موسى; born 10 September 1961), an Egyptian journalist and TV presenter. He also works for Sada El-Balad channel and presents political programs.

== Early life and career ==
Mussa was born in September 1961, in Sohag, Egypt. In 1979, Mussa enrolled at the Faculty of Mass Communication at Sohag University, and graduated from it and obtained his BA in 1983, where he began working in the Egyptian media and press since his graduation. He worked for Al-Tahrir channel, and after a while he left it to move to the Egyptian Channel, Sada El-Balad to present a program named in Arabic: على مسؤوليتي.

== Personal life ==
Mussa married Aya al-Jammal, and had two children with her.
