= Entissar Amer =

First lady of Egypt

- انتصار عامر
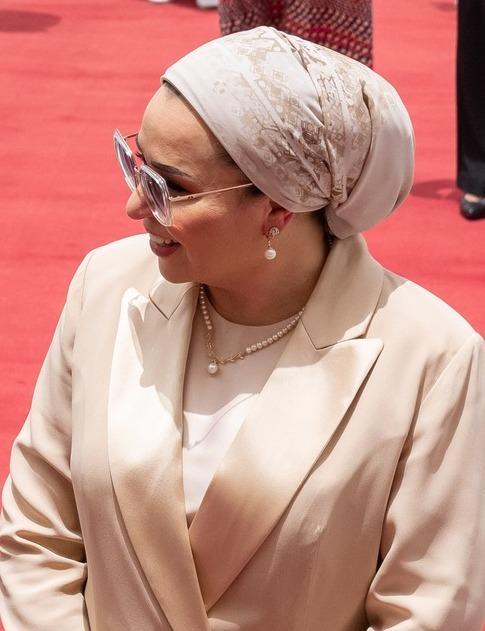
- Amer in 2023

First Lady of Egypt
- Assumed role 8 June 2014
- President: Abdel Fattah el-Sisi
- Preceded by: Naglaa Mahmoud

Personal details
- Born: Entissar (or Intissar) Ahmed Amer; 3 December 1956 (age 69) Cairo, Republic of Egypt
- Spouse: Abdel Fattah el-Sisi (m. 1977)
- Children: 4, including Mahmoud
- Education: Ain Shams University

Entissar Amer (Arabic: انتصار عامر, IPA: [enteˈsˤɑːɾ ˈʕæːmeɾ]; born 3 December 1956) is the current First Lady of Egypt, since her husband Abdel Fattah el-Sisi became the sixth president of Egypt on 8 June 2014.

== Education ==
Amer received her high school diploma from El Abbassia High School in 1977. She received a BCom degree in accounting from Ain Shams University.

== Family ==
Amer married her cousin Abdel Fattah el-Sisi in 1977, after he graduated from the Military Academy. They have three sons and one daughter: Mahmoud, Mostafa, Hassan and Aya.

Amer became the First Lady of Egypt upon her husband's appointment as the president of Egypt after the June 2013 Egyptian protests, which pushed for a military coup, throwing Mohamed Morsi out of power. Judge Adly Mansour was appointed as an acting president during the transitional period from 3 July 2013 to 7 June 2014. El-Sisi won the presidential election that was held afterward, and took the oath of office on 8 June 2014.

== Corruption allegation ==
An Egyptian who was formerly a military contractor, Mohamed Ali, alleged that Amer was part of "rampant corruption" involving military officials and Sisi's relatives. Street protests took place in response to his claims about Amer and her husband.

Honorary titles
Preceded by Naglaa Mahmoud	First Lady of Egypt; 2014 – present	Incumbent
