= Al-Amthal =

al-Amthal (Arabic: أَمْثَال) is a literary term used to describe Arabic proverbs. Ancient Arab scholars wrote books of compilations of proverbs, called "Kitab al-Amthal". The most famous collection of medieval Arabic proverbs is Mjm’a Al’amthal by Ahmad ibn Muhammad al-Maydani.

== Examples ==
Proverbs	English Translation
اطلب من العلوم علماً ينفعك ينفي الأذى والعيب ثم يرفعك.	Ask the sciences for knowledge that will benefit you, negate harm and defect, and then elevate you.
العلم يرفع بيتاً لا عماد له والجهل يهدم بيت العز والشرف.	Knowledge raises a house without pillars, and ignorance destroys the house of glory and honor.
أعلمه الرماية كل يوم فلما اشتد ساعده رماني.	I taught him archery every day, and when he got good at it, he threw an arrow at me.
تجري الرياح بما لا تشتهي السفن.	Winds blow counter to what ships desire.
أرسل حكيماً ولا توصه.	Send a wise man and do not advise him.
السكوت علامة الرضا.	Silence is the sign of approval.
خير الكلام ما قل ودل.	Good brevity makes sense.
هذا الشبل من ذاك الأسد.	This cub is from that lion.
إذا قصرت يدك على المكافأة، فاطل لسانك بالشكر.	If you’re unable to reward, then make sure to thank.
أرى كل إنسان يرى عيب غيره ويعمى عن العيب الذي هو فيه.	Everyone is critical of the flaws of others, but blind to their own.
