= Mahmoud el-Sisi =

Egyptian brigadier general (born 1982)

Deputy Head of General Intelligence Directorate
- Incumbent
- Assumed office June 2018
- President: Abdel Fattah el-Sisi

Personal details
- Born: Mahmoud Abdel Fattah Saeed Hussein Khalil el-Sisi; 1982 (age 43–44)
- Spouse: Noha Al-Tohami
- Parents: Abdel Fattah el-Sisi; Entissar Amer

Military service
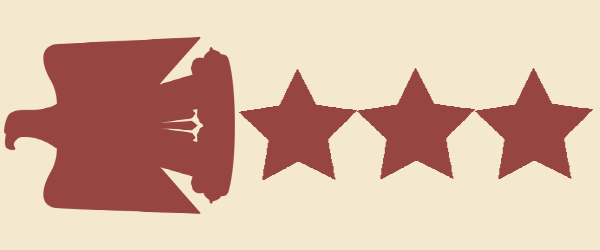
- Rank: Brigadier general

Mahmoud Abdel Fattah Saeed Hussein Khalil el-Sisi (Arabic: محمود عبد الفتاح سعيد حسين خليل السيسي; born 1982) is the deputy head of the Egyptian General Intelligence Directorate and the son of Egyptian President Abdel Fattah el-Sisi.

== Biography ==
Mahmoud is the oldest son of President Abdel Fattah El-Sisi and his wife Entissar Amer, who are cousins. He is a graduate of the Egyptian Military Academy. He was a major in the Military Intelligence, then in June 2018 he rose to the rank of brigadier general, and was appointed deputy head of General Intelligence, after he was head of the agency's technical office, under the leadership of Major General Abbas Kamel. Mohamed Ali, the building contractor whose online videos criticising president el-Sisi sparked off the September 2019 Egyptian protests claimed that Mahmoud el-Sisi was the de facto real head of the Mukhabarat.

L'Espresso linked Egyptian President Abdel Fattah el-Sisi's son Mahmoud el-Sisi to the murder of Giulio Regeni, stating that "It is hard to think that el-Sisi's son was not aware of Regeni's movements before he disappeared."

On 20 November 2019, two GIS officials interviewed by Mada Masr stated that Mahmoud was to be shifted from GIS to the Military Intelligence agency and assigned to a diplomatic position in Moscow in 2020. The reason cited for the move and attributed to people close to president el-Sisi was a "negative impact on [president el-Sisi's] image" resulting from Mahmoud's alleged ineffectiveness in his responsibilities and visible role in high-level decision-making. The reason attributed to senior United Arab Emirates government officials is that they saw Mahmoud's role as "damaging to the president". Regional and international media attention to Mahmoud's role was cited as significantly harming president el-Sisi's image and threatening the "stability of the administration". The proposed move was "welcomed" by Russian authorities. In response to Mada Masr's report, Mada Masr journalist Shady Zalat was detained by Egyptian security services for a day and a half; 18 Mada Masr staff, freelancers and foreign journalists were detained incommunicado inside the journal's office for several hours on 24 November; three were briefly detained; and laptops and telephones were confiscated. Chief Editor Lina Attalah described the preparation of the report as having had "every single detail [confirmed] by at least two separate sources — and when it came to some details, as many as four".

== Personal life ==
He is married to Noha Al-Tohami, the daughter of Farid Al-Tohamy, the former head of the General Intelligence and Administrative Control Authority.
