= Abdullah Morsi =

Egyptian presidential son (1994–2019)

- Born: 3 September 1994; Sharqia Governorate, Egypt
- Died: 4 September 2019 (aged 25); Giza, Egypt
- Resting place: Nasr City
- Parents: Mohamed Morsi (father); Naglaa Mahmoud (mother)

Abdullah Mohamed Mohamed Morsi Eissa al-Ayyat (Arabic: عبد الله محمد محمد مرسي عيسى العياط, romanized: ʿAbdullāh Muḥammad Muḥammad Mursī ʻĪsá alʻAyāṭ; 3 September 1994 – 4 September 2019) was the son of Mohamed Morsi, who was the fifth President of Egypt and served from 2012 to 2013, when he was ousted in a military coup.

== Biography ==
Born on 3 September 1994 in Sharqia Governorate, Abdullah Morsi was the youngest son of Mohamed Morsi, who was Egypt's first democratically elected president in 2012 and was overthrown in a coup the following year. Abdullah's mother was Naglaa Mahmoud who was Mohamed's cousin. On 1 March 2014, he was arrested for consuming hashish, and released on bail a few days later. He was sentenced to one year in prison, his lawyer denouncing it as a "fabricated" case. He was released on 22 July 2015.

In 2018 he studied business administration at the Canadian International College. On 10 October 2018, he was arrested for "spreading fake news" for having denounced during an interview with the Associated Press, the conditions of detention of his father. He was released on bail. His father died in detention on 17 June 2019. Abdullah Morsi accused President Abdel Fattah al-Sisi of having killed him.

He died less than three months after the death of his father, on 4 September 2019, of what was said at the time to be a heart attack while driving his car; he had just turned 25 the day before. On 6 September 2019, in the middle of the night (to ward off any revolt), he was buried in all discretion and under close surveillance in the Cairo district of Nasr City, alongside his father, in the presence of his family. On 7 September 2020, Abdullah's lawyers stated that he had actually died after being injected with a lethal substance and not by a heart attack while driving his car as had originally been reported.
