= First Lady of Egypt =

Spouse of the President of Egypt

First Lady of Egypt سيدة مصر الأولى

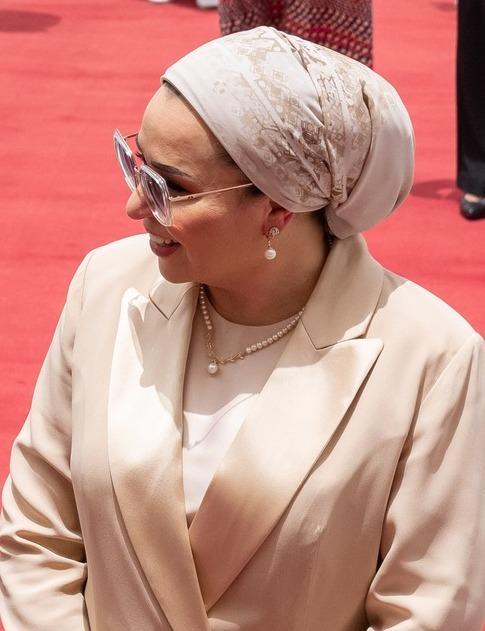
- Incumbent; Entissar Amer since 8 June 2014
- Residence: Heliopolis Palace
- Precursor: Queen Consort of Egypt
- Inaugural holder: Aisha Labib
- Formation: 18 June 1953

First Lady of Egypt (Arabic: سيدة مصر الأولى, romanized: Sayyidat Miṣr al-ūlá) is the official title of the wife of the president of Egypt.

== History ==
The title was established on June 18 1953 following the abolishment of the monarchy and the declaration of the republic, replacing the Queen Consort of Egypt title.

Aisha Labib became Egypt’s first First Lady as she was the wife of Egypt’s first President Muhammad Naguib. Naguib’s presidency was short lived and was succeeded by Gamal Abdel Nasser and as a result, Tahia Abdel Nasser, the daughter of a Persian immigrant to Egypt became Egypt’s second First Lady.

Jehan Sadat became the First Lady of Egypt on 15 October 1970 following Anwar Sadat’s inauguration as president. Jehan was born to an Upper-Egyptian father and a British mother from England.

Suzzane Mubarak became Egypt’s fourth First Lady on the 14th of October 1981. Suzanne was also born to an Upper-Egyptian father from Al Minya and a British mother, from Wales. She is also Egypt’s first Christian First Lady.

Naglaa Mahmoud became Egypt’s fifth First Lady on June 30 2012 following the victory of Egypt’s first democratically president Mohamed Morsi (2012–2013). Mrs. Naglaa rejected the title of First Lady, preferring to be called "First Servant," the "president's wife," or "Um Ahmed," a traditional name which means mother of Ahmed, her oldest son.

== First ladies of Egypt (1953–present) ==
Name	Portrait	Term begins	Term ends	President of Egypt
Aisha Labib		18 June 1953	14 November 1954	Mohamed Naguib
Tahia Abdel Nasser		23 June 1956	28 September 1970	Gamal Abdel Nasser
Jehan Sadat		28 September 1970	6 October 1981	Anwar Sadat
Wafeya el Otefi (acting)		6 October 1981	14 October 1981	Sufi Abu Taleb (acting)
Suzanne Mubarak		14 October 1981	11 February 2011	Hosni Mubarak
Naglaa Mahmoud		30 June 2012	3 July 2013	Mohamed Morsi
Entissar Amer		8 June 2014	Incumbent	Abdel Fattah el-Sisi

== See also ==
- List of presidents of Egypt
