= Gamal Abdel Nasser Museum =

Biographical museum in Cairo, Egypt

- Established: 28 September 2016
- Location: Cairo, Egypt
- Coordinates: 30.086520°N 31.310653°E
- Type: Biographical museum
- Owner: Egyptian Government

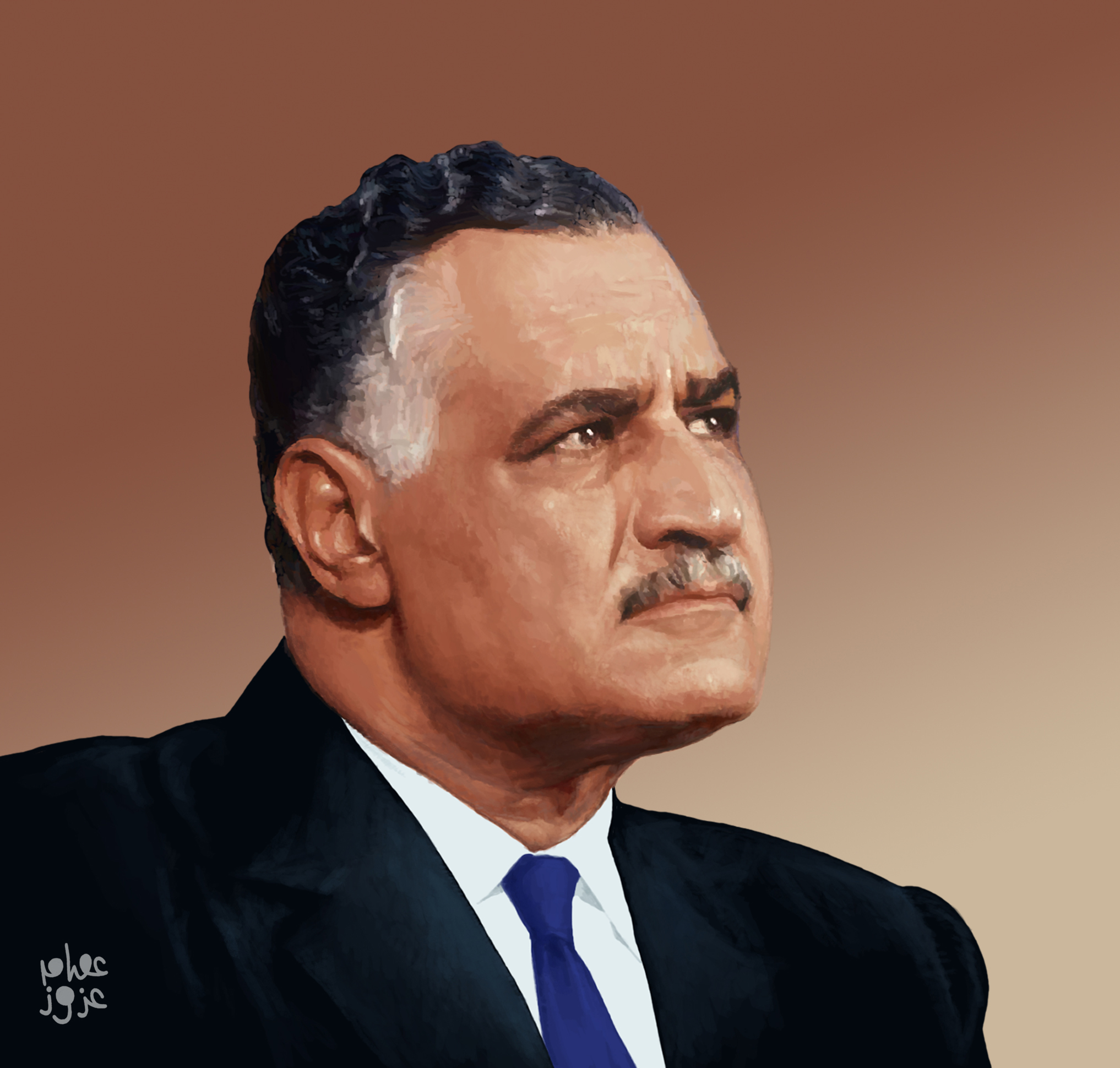
Gamal Abdel Nasser

The Gamal Abdel Nasser Museum is a biographical museum in Cairo, Egypt. The museum is dedicated to president Gamal Abdel Nasser, the second President of Egypt. Opened in 2016, the Gamal Abdel Nasser Museum occupies Nasser's former residence in Heliopolis, where he lived with his family during his 18 years in power.

== History ==
The idea of converting the residence of the former Egyptian President Gamal Abdel Nasser into a museum began in 1970, but actual work did not begin until 2008 after the Ministry of Culture took possession of the house. Then, in 2014, the official conversion of the house into a museum commenced after president Abdel Fattah el-Sisi assumed the presidency. This project reflects the respect Egyptians have for their history and their leaders and is considered one of the most important cultural projects commemorating president Nasser.

On September 28, 2016, the Gamal Abdel Nasser Museum was inaugurated on the anniversary of his death, in the presence of Egyptian President Abdel Fattah el-Sisi. The museum is located in the late leader's former residence in Manshiyat al-Bakri, in the Heliopolis district of Cairo, the same place where he lived throughout his rule until his death in 1970. The house witnessed many major political and social events and hosted numerous prominent figures from around the world. After the death of his wife, Tahia Kazem, in 1990, ownership of the house was transferred to the state to be converted into a museum in his honor.

== Overview ==
The museum comprises three main exhibits documenting the life of president Gamal Abdel Nasser and the history of Egypt during his rule.

The exhibit displays the original parts of the president's house as they were during his lifetime, including his private rooms such as his office, bedroom, and living room, as well as other rooms where his family lived.

A People's Story Exhibit presents the history of Egypt and the most important events it witnessed during Nasser's rule, such as the 1952 Revolution, the Aswan High Dam project, the nationalization of the Suez Canal, the Suez war, the 1967 war, and the War of Attrition.

The Collectibles Hall Exhibit contains the medals and gifts that Nasser received from various countries around the world, in addition to some of his personal belongings such as clothing and cameras.

The museum includes a specialized library containing a collection of books and studies that dealt with the life of president Gamal Abdel Nasser, as well as audio-visual materials that contribute to documenting the history of Egypt during that period. It also includes some service units that allow visitors to have a unique.

== See also ==
- Biographical museum
- List of museums in Egypt
