= El Adwah =

Village in Monufia Governorate, Egypt

El Adwah العدوة
- Location in Egypt
- Coordinates: 30°37′56″N 31°34′38″E
- Country: Egypt
- Governorate: Sharqia Governorate
- Time zone: UTC+2 (EET)
  - Summer (DST): UTC+3 (EEST)

El Adwah (Arabic: العدوة) is a village in the Egyptian governorate of the Sharqia Governorate. The estimated population is 10,650 inhabitants.

== Notable people ==
- Mohamed Morsi, fifth President of Egypt
