= Aisha Naguib =

Former First Lady of Egypt

- عائشة نجيب

First Lady of Egypt
- In role 18 June 1953 – 14 November 1954
- President: Mohamed Naguib
- Preceded by: Position established
- Succeeded by: Tahia Kazem

Personal details
- Died: 1971
- Party: Independent
- Spouse: Mohamed Naguib (m. 1934)
- Children: 3

Aisha Labib (Arabic: عائشة لبيب; died in 1971), also known by her married name Aisha Naguib (عائشة نجيب), was the wife of Mohamed Naguib, one the two principal leaders of the Egyptian Revolution of 1952, who became Egypt's first president. She was the mother of the couple's three sons, Farouk, Ali, and Youssef.

== Biography ==
Aisha Labib was the second wife of Naguib, who referred to her in his 1955 memoirs 'Egypt's Destiny' (subsequently republished decades later under the title 'I Was the President of Egypt'). Naguib married her in 1934, following his divorce from his first wife after being married for only 40 days. Labib was the daughter of a late military commander of a cavalry unit of Egyptian Army, and the sister of his friend, Mahmoud Labib, an engineer.

Prior to their marriage, Labib was living with her widowed mother, and Labib's three sisters, Aziza, Fatima and Khadiga, in a large house in Helmiyet Al-Zeitoun. Labib and Naguib would later live in that same neighborhood as husband and wife. Labib was living in poor financial conditions, with a large number of debts. Naguib mentioned in his memoirs that the two families lived on LE80 (80 Egyptian pounds) a month, despite their estate being 512 acres, under the supervision of the judiciary, and the Ministry of Endowments.

Egypt had no tradition of a "First Lady", however, Labib was by Naguib's side throughout his brief tenure as Egyptian President following the Egyptian Revolution of 1952 for a period of 19 months, from 18 June 18 1953 until 14 November 1954. During this time they received visiting heads of state and heads of government. She was known as "Aisha Hanim." The couple had three sons, Farouk, Ali, and Youssef.

Following the end of Naguib's presidency in November 1954, and the acrimonious split between him and his former comrades in the revolutionary government, Naguib was placed under unofficial house arrest, restricted to a villa in Cairo. Labib moved with her husband to reside with him in the villa of Zainab Al-Wakeel in El Marg district. She suffered at the end of her life from obesity. Labib died in 1971 after the death two years prior of her son, Ali, who was killed in an accident in Germany.

Honorary titles
Preceded by office created	First Lady of Egypt; 1953–1954	Succeeded by Tahia Kazem
