= Khalid Abdel Nasser =

Egyptian activist (1949–2011)

- خالد عبد الناصر
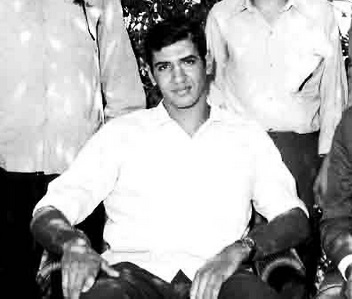
- Khalid during a scouting event, 1969
- Born: 13 December 1949; Egypt
- Died: 15 September 2011 (aged 61); Cairo, Egypt
- Education: Cairo University; University of Cambridge
- Occupations: Civil engineer, professor, activist
- Political party: Nasserist
- Parents: Gamal Abdel Nasser (father); Tahia Kazem (mother)
- Relatives: Abdel Nasser Hussein (grandfather); Hoda Abdel Nasser (sister); Hakim Abdel Nasser (brother); Aida Abdel Nasser (aunt); Al-Laithi Abdel Nasser (uncle); Tarek Abdel Nasser (uncle); Ashraf Marwan (brother-in-law)

Khalid Abdel Nasser (Arabic: خالد عبد الناصر, also spelled Khalid 'Abd al-Nasir; 13 December 1949 – 15 September 2011) was the eldest son of Egypt's second President Gamal Abdel Nasser and his wife Tahia Kazem.

== Biography ==
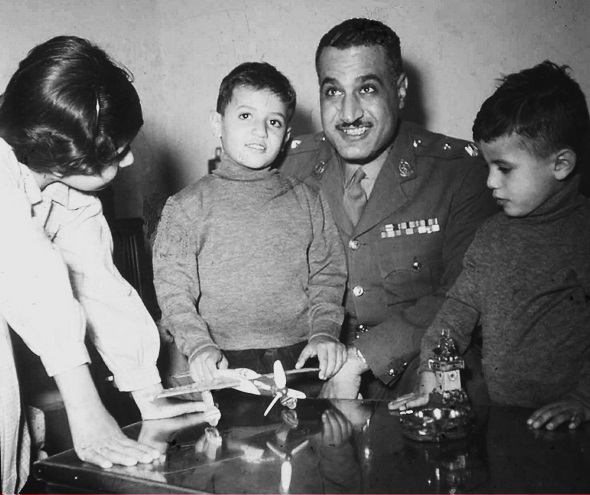
Khalid (second from left) with his father Gamal Abdel Nasser, sister Mona (left) and brother Abdel Hamid (right), 1956

Abdel Nasser was born in 1949. He was a graduate of Cairo University and Cambridge University where he studied civil engineering.

Abdel Nasser's public profile became pronounced in his early adulthood on account of his often troubled relationship with Egyptian president Anwar Sadat, his father's successor. Time Magazine stated that when Sadat asked to acquire Gamal Abdel Nasser's bulletproof limousine, Khalid refused and after a heated argument with Sadat, he set the car on fire, destroying it.

In later years, Abdel Nasser became a vocal critic of Sadat, and his presidential successor, Hosni Mubarak, both of whose policies had diverged significantly from those of Gamal Abdel Nasser. In 1988, he was accused of co-founding (with Egyptian diplomat Mahmoud Noureddin) a secret leftist organization, Egypt's Revolution (Thawrat Miṣr), a Nasserist group that violently opposed the 1979 Camp David Accords between Egypt and Israel. The Mubarak government sought the death penalty in a case which accused Abdel Nasser of trying to overthrow the Egyptian government, and of involvement in a spate of assassinations and bombings. The case eventually became a test of strength between the judiciary and the executive when judges threw out much of the case, accusing police and prosecutors of collusion in torturing the defendants.

The case also created anger among many Egyptians who sympathized with Abdel Nasser because of the general anti-Israeli sentiment at the time, the fact that he was the son of Gamal Abdel Nasser, a popular figure in the country, and reports that the evidence was provided by American intelligence. Abdel Nasser had escaped to Yugoslavia during the trial, but was acquitted anyway.

== Later life and death ==
In the mid-1990s following international sanctions against Iraq, Abdel Nasser received $16.6 million worth of Saddam Hussein's oil vouchers in the Oil-for-Food Programme, more than anyone else in Egypt, according to the list of beneficiaries. He later became a professor at Cairo University's Faculty of Engineering, a job which he held for the remainder of his life.

In February 2011, during the Egyptian Revolution of 2011, Abdel Nasser joined pro-democracy demonstrations in Tahrir Square against Mubarak and his regime. According to The Telegraph, Abdel Nasser's participation "was seen as helping to give the revolution a posthumous stamp of approval from an iconic Egyptian hero". Later that year, on 30 August he fell into a coma ending in his death at age 61 in a Cairo hospital on 15 September. He is survived by three children.
