= Tahia Abdel Nasser =

Former First Lady of Egypt (1920–1992)

- تحية عبد الناصر
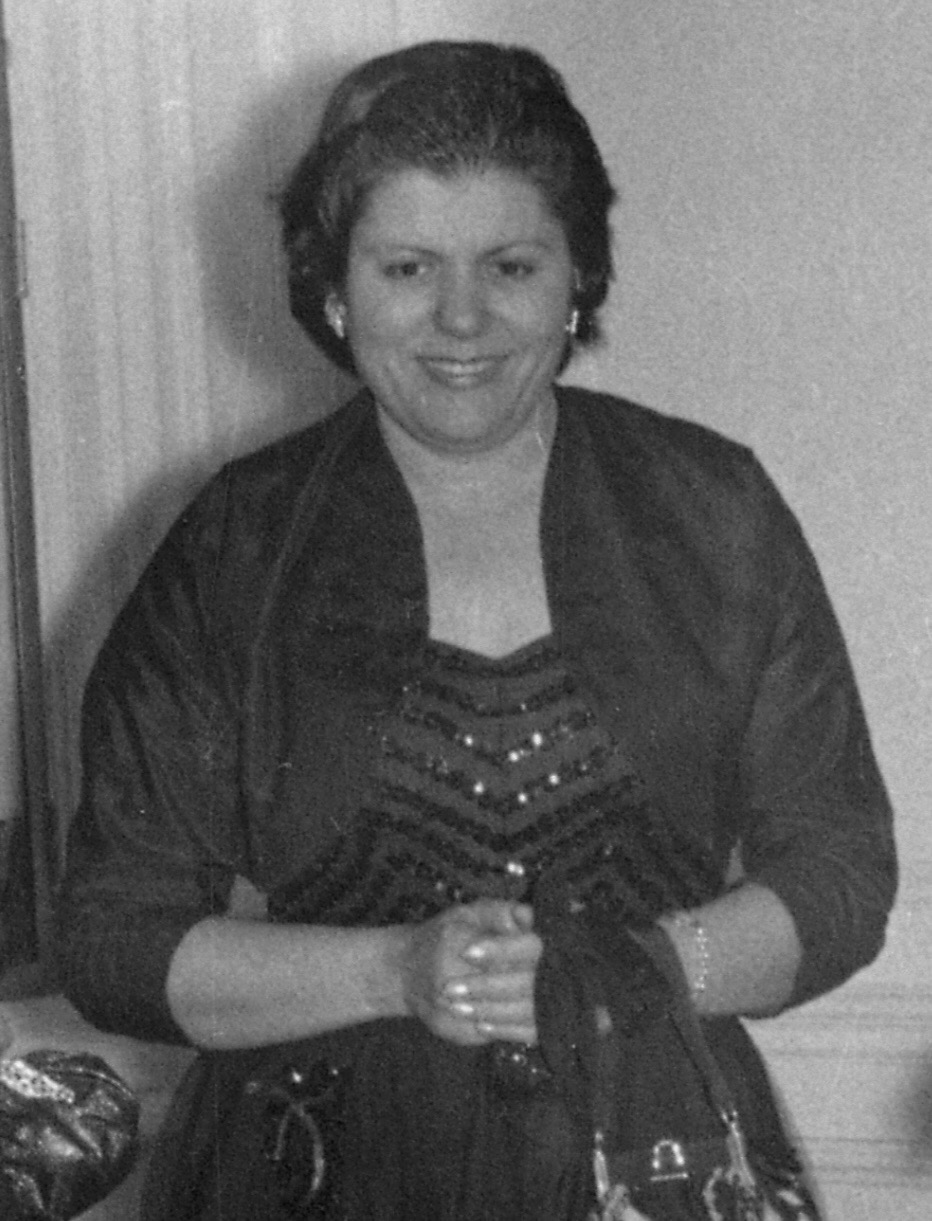
- Abdel Nasser in 1955

First Lady of Egypt
- In role June 23, 1956 – September 28, 1970
- President: Gamal Abdel Nasser
- Preceded by: Aisha Labib
- Succeeded by: Jehan Sadat

Personal details
- Born: Tahia Kazem; March 1, 1920 Cairo, Sultanate of Egypt
- Died: March 25, 1992 (aged 72) Cairo, Egypt
- Party: Independent
- Spouse: Gamal Abdel Nasser (m. 1944; died 1970)
- Children: 5, including Khalid Abdel Nasser; Hakim Abdel Nasser; Hoda Abdel Nasser

Tahia Abdel Nasser (Arabic: تحية عبد الناصر, née Kazem, كاظم, 1 March 1920 – 25 March 1992) was the First Lady of Egypt from 23 June 1956 to 28 September 1970 as the wife of Gamal Abdel Nasser, the 2nd President of Egypt. She married Nasser in 1944, and the couple had five children, two daughters and three sons. Unlike her successors, she largely stayed out of public life during her husband's presidency. Her memoir, written in 1973, was published in Arabic in 2011 and in English in 2013.

== Early life ==
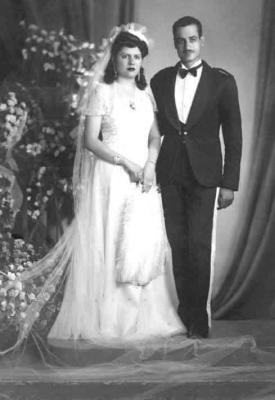
Tahia with Nasser at their wedding, 1944

Tahia Kazem was born in Cairo on 1 March 1920. Her father was a successful tea merchant who had migrated from Iran at the age of eighteen, and her mother was an Egyptian born in Tanta. Her father held Iranian nationality and later obtained Egyptian citizenship, and he traded in carpets as well as tea. Her family was wealthy, in contrast to Nasser's modest background. After her parents died, she lived in the home of her elder brother, Abdel Hamid Kazem, who became her guardian.

== Marriage ==
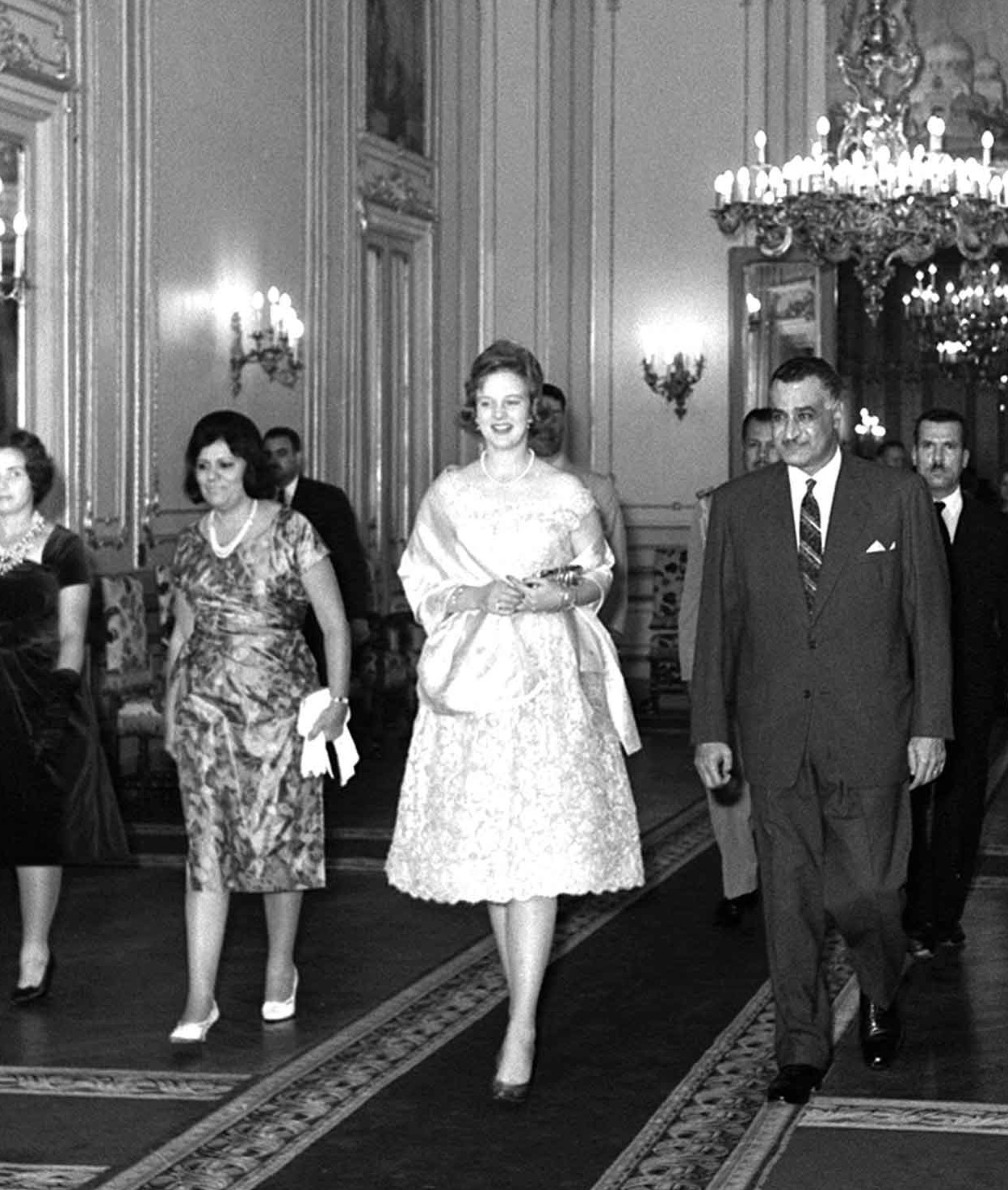
Gamal and Tahia Abdel Nasser with Princess Margrethe of Denmark, later Queen Margrethe II, in 1962

The French biographer Jean Lacouture wrote that Tahia met Gamal Abdel Nasser through Abdel Hakim Amer, a friend of her brother. Arabic accounts say that they first met when she served tea during one of Nasser's visits to her brother's home. Nasser, then an army captain, asked her brother for her hand. According to Al Jazeera, her family hesitated because of his military career and modest salary, but she accepted his proposal. Their engagement took place in January 1944, on Nasser's birthday, and they married in June 1944. The couple initially lived on his small salary as an instructor.

They had two daughters, Hoda and Mona, and three sons, Khalid, Abdel Hamid and Abdel Hakim. Mona later married the businessman Ashraf Marwan. Tahia later learned French and English.

== Before the 1952 revolution ==
During the 1948 Arab–Israeli War, Nasser wrote her 46 letters during his ten-month posting to Palestine. In her memoir, she recalled that although his letters assured her that he was well, she found bloodied clothing when he came home on leave, as he had been wounded by a ricocheting bullet.

In the years before the 1952 Egyptian revolution, the couple's home was used to store weapons and ammunition taken from the army by Nasser and fellow officers, including Abdel Hakim Amer and Salah Salem. The house also hosted secret meetings, and banned books and anti-government pamphlets were kept there. She wrote that she never discussed politics with Nasser and did not know of the plans for the coup.

In the days before the revolution, Nasser told her that he was busy marking exam papers for the Staff College, and he asked her to prepare extra food for visiting officers. On the night of the revolution, he left the house in uniform after she had gone to bed, and she heard gunfire around midnight. The next morning, Tharwat Okasha visited to congratulate her, and a messenger later told her that Nasser was safe at the army command headquarters. She heard the Free Officers' announcement read on the radio by Anwar Sadat.

== First Lady ==
Nasser became president on 23 June 1956, and Tahia remained First Lady until his death on 28 September 1970. She largely stayed out of public life and did not interfere in her husband's work. The Cairo-based political researcher Nael M. Shama described her as a traditional middle-class wife, and contrasted her with her more Westernised successors Jehan Sadat and Suzanne Mubarak, who were officially called "Egypt's first lady". She rarely attended public events or received delegations with Nasser.

Nasser preferred that she stay at home, and she travelled with him infrequently, with trips to Yugoslavia, Georgia and the Soviet Union. Her first official trip abroad was to Yugoslavia, where she attended an official reception for the first time. In 1958, while she was in Yugoslavia, Nasser flew secretly to the Soviet Union after the overthrow of the Iraqi monarchy, and she and the rest of the delegation were placed under the protection of the Yugoslav army. During that visit, she met the Indian prime minister Jawaharlal Nehru.

In her memoir, she described the family's simple lifestyle, including one meal a week without meat or poultry so that the children would understand hardship. She wrote that Nasser accepted only symbolic gifts and handed larger gifts, such as cars, a plane and a ship, over to the state. She also recalled that Nasser had predicted an Israeli attack shortly before the Six-Day War broke out in June 1967, and that he asked her to pray for victory.

== Widowhood and death ==
After Nasser's death in 1970, Tahia did not remarry and devoted herself to raising her children. Parliament allocated the family home in Manshiyat al-Bakri, in Cairo, to her, and she received a state pension. She rarely left Egypt, and once asked to return home on the fourth day of a trip to Spain with one of her daughters. She remained largely silent in public for the rest of her life.

She died on 25 March 1992. In accordance with her wishes, she was buried beside her husband at the Gamal Abdel Nasser Mosque in Cairo. After her death, the house in Manshiyat al-Bakri was used as offices by the presidency until 2008, and President Abdel Fattah el-Sisi opened it as the Gamal Abdel Nasser Museum in October 2016.

== Memoir ==
Tahia made several attempts to write about her life with Nasser, the first around 1959, but she discarded her early drafts. Encouraged by her youngest son, Abdel Hakim, she began writing her memoir in 1973, three years after Nasser's death, for her family and without intending to publish it. In the foreword, her daughter Hoda wrote that publication had been delayed by a political climate hostile to Nasser under Sadat and, to a lesser extent, under Hosni Mubarak.

The Arabic memoir, Zikrayat Ma'ahu (Memories with Him), was published by Dar El Shorouk in Cairo in 2011, with 136 pages of text and a 110-page appendix of photographs. The American University in Cairo Press published an English translation by Shereen Mosaad, Nasser: My Husband, in 2013.

Shama wrote that the memoir revealed few secrets but was important for its personal account of Nasser's character, including his simplicity, stubbornness and sympathy for the poor. Robert Fisk wrote that it was not a lively read, and noted that it portrayed Nasser as a devoted husband and father while making no mention of the hanging of his enemies or of torture. Fisk also wrote that she repeated the official account that Mohamed Naguib had tried to stage a coup against Nasser. The journalist Seth J. Frantzman described the book as weak on politics and history but an honest, home-centred account. Asharq Al-Awsat noted that it omitted Naguib's removal and the North Yemen Civil War.

== Honours ==
=== Foreign honours ===
- Finland
  - Grand Cross of the Order of the White Rose of Finland (1967)
- Malaysia
  - Honorary Recipient of the Order of the Crown of the Realm (1965)

Honorary titles
Preceded by Aisha Labib	First Lady of Egypt; 1956–1970	Succeeded by Jehan Sadat
