= Wadi el-Natrun Prison =

Prison in Egypt

- Interactive map of Wadi el-Natrun Prison

Wadi el-Natrun Prison (Arabic: سجن وادي النطرون) is an Egyptian prison complex located on the outskirts of the Wadi El Natrun depression, near the Cairo-Alexandria Desert road, in the Beheira Governorate, north of Cairo. It consists of two separate facilities 5 kilometers apart. It was established in September 1994. After its establishment, inmates from Abu Zaabal and Tora Prison begin to be transferred to it.

== 2011 prison break ==
The prison was used to incarcerate Islamists and other political prisoners under the regime of Hosni Mubarak and after the Egyptian Revolution of 2011, several prominent Muslim Brotherhood activists were imprisoned there. On 30 January 2011, thousands of prisoners were helped to escape from the prison. A June 2013 court concluded that Hamas and Hezbollah worked with the Muslim Brotherhood to orchestrate the jailbreak, though some prisoners have suggested that those responsible for freeing them were in fact police officers acting under Interior Ministry orders. 34 Brotherhood activists, including the future president Mohamed Morsi and Saad El-Katatni, were among those who escaped from the prison. After the coup against Morsi in July 2013, Morsi faced trial for his role in the prison break. He and 105 others were sentenced to death on 16 May 2015. The court of cassation in November 2016 overturned the death sentence on Morsi and five other Muslim Brotherhood members and then ordered a retrial for the similar charges.

In May 2022, British-Egyptian political prisoner Alaa Abd El Fattah was transferred to Wadi Al-Natroun Prison, where he has access to reading material, television, and written correspondence
