= Naglaa Mahmoud =

Former First Lady of Egypt

- نجلاء محمود
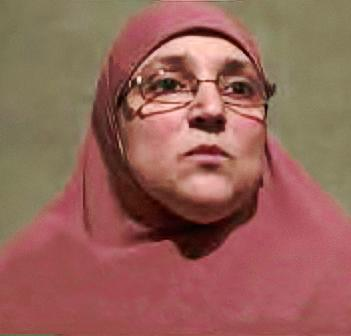
- Mahmoud in 2012

First Lady of Egypt
- In role 30 June 2012 – 3 July 2013
- President: Mohamed Morsi
- Preceded by: Suzanne Mubarak
- Succeeded by: Entissar Amer

Personal details
- Born: Naglaa Ali Mahmoud; 4 July 1962 (age 64) Ain Shams, Egypt
- Spouse: Mohamed Morsi (m. 1979; died 2019)
- Children: 5, including Abdullah

Naglaa Ali Mahmoud (Arabic: نجلاء علي محمود, IPA: [ˈnæɡlæ ˈʕæli mæħˈmuːd] or [næɡˈlæːʔ -]; 4 July 1962) is the widow and cousin of the fifth President of Egypt, Mohamed Morsi and was First Lady of Egypt from 2012 to 2013.

Naglaa rejected the title of First Lady, preferring to be called "First Servant", the "president's wife", or "Umm Ahmed", a traditional honorific (kunya) which means mother of Ahmed, her oldest son.

== Personal life ==
Naglaa married former president of Egypt Mohamed Morsi in 1979 when she was a seventeen-year-old student. Naglaa and Morsi have five children, including Abdullah and six grandchildren.

Honorary titles
Preceded by Suzanne Mubarak	First Lady of Egypt; 2012–2013	Succeeded by Entissar Amer
