= Mohamed Morsi =

President of Egypt from 2012 to 2013

His Excellency Mohamed Morsi
- مُحَمَّد مُرْسِي
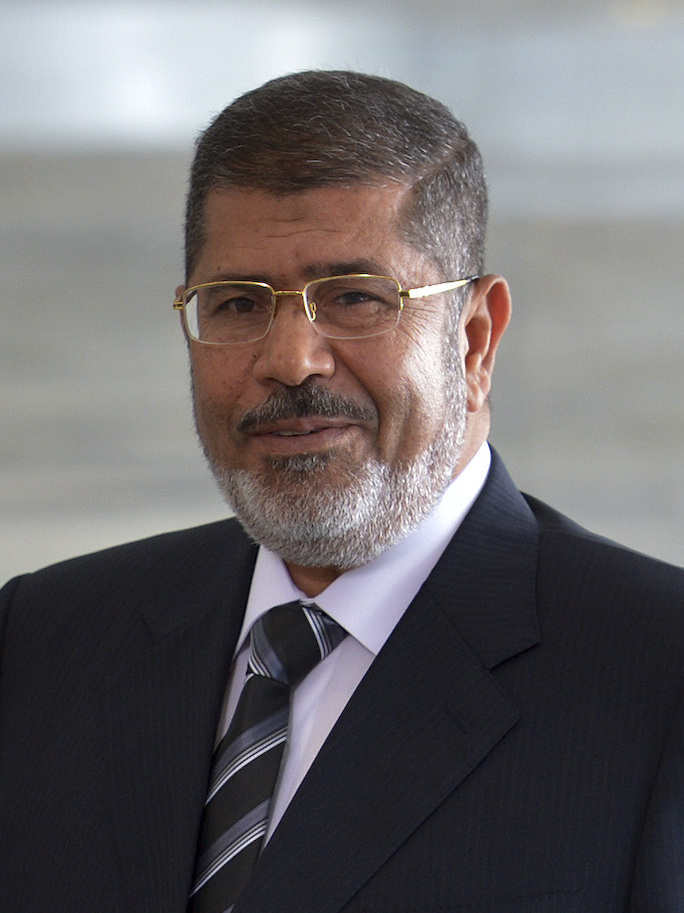
- Morsi in 2013

5th President of Egypt
- In office 30 June 2012 – 3 July 2013
- Prime Minister: Kamal Ganzouri; Hesham Qandil
- Vice President: Mahmoud Mekki
- Preceded by: Hosni Mubarak; Mohamed Hussein Tantawi (interim)
- Succeeded by: Adly Mansour (interim); Abdel Fattah el-Sisi

26th Secretary General of the Non-Aligned Movement
- In office 30 June 2012 – 30 August 2012
- Preceded by: Mohamed Hussein Tantawi
- Succeeded by: Mahmoud Ahmadinejad

Chairman of the Freedom and Justice Party
- In office 30 April 2011 – 24 June 2012
- Preceded by: Position established
- Succeeded by: Saad El-Katatni

Member of the People's Assembly
- In office 1 December 2000 – 12 December 2005
- Preceded by: Numan Gumaa
- Succeeded by: Mahmoud Abaza

Personal details
- Born: Mohamed Mohamed Morsi Eissa al-Ayyat; 8 August 1951 El Adwah, Egypt
- Died: 17 June 2019 (aged 67) Tora Prison, Cairo, Egypt
- Resting place: Nasr City
- Party: Freedom and Justice Party
- Other political affiliations: Muslim Brotherhood in Egypt
- Spouse: Naglaa Mahmoud (m. 1979)
- Children: 5, including Abdullah
- Education: Cairo University; University of Southern California

Mohamed Mohamed Morsi Eissa Al-Ayyat (Note: The spellings of his first and last names vary. A survey of 14 news organizations plus Wikipedia in July 2012 (archive at Wayback Machine) found that 11 used "Mohamed" and four used "Mohammed"; nine used "Morsi", five used "Mursi", and one used "Morsy". The official Egypt State Information Service uses both "Morsi" and "Morsy".) (/ˈmɔːrsi/; Arabic: مُحَمَّد مُحَمَّد مُرْسِي عِيسَى العَيَّاط, romanized: Muḥammad Muḥammad Mursī ʿĪsā al-ʿAyyāṭ, IPA: [mæˈħæmmæd ˈmoɾsi ˈʕiːsæ (ʔe)l.ʕɑjˈjɑːtˤ]; 8 August 1951 – 17 June 2019) was an Egyptian politician, engineer, and professor who served as the fifth president of Egypt from 2012 to 2013, when General Abdel Fattah el-Sisi removed him from office in a coup d'état after protests in June. Affiliated with the Muslim Brotherhood organization, Morsi led the Freedom and Justice Party from 2011 to 2012.

Morsi was born in El Adwah, Sharqia Governorate, before studying metallurgical engineering at Cairo University and then materials science at the University of Southern California. He became an associate professor at California State University, Northridge, from 1982 to 1985 before returning to Egypt to teach at Zagazig University. Associating with the Muslim Brotherhood, which was then barred from office under President Hosni Mubarak, Morsi stood as an independent candidate for the 2000 parliamentary election. Following the Egyptian Revolution of 2011, which resulted in Mubarak's resignation, Morsi came to the forefront as head of the Freedom and Justice Party. It became the largest party in the 2011–12 parliamentary election and Morsi was elected president in the 2012 presidential election. On 30 June 2012, the SCAF handed the authority to Morsi, ending 6 decades of military rule.

In November 2012, Morsi issued a provisional constitutional declaration that granted him unrestricted authority and the authority to legislate without the need for judicial oversight or review. This was a move to stop the Mubarak-era judges from getting rid of the Second Constituent Assembly. The new constitution that was then hastily finalized by the Islamist-dominated constitutional assembly, presented to the president, and scheduled for a referendum before the Supreme Constitutional Court could rule on the constitutionality of the assembly, was described by independent press agencies not aligned with the presidential administration as an "Islamist coup". These issues, along with complaints of prosecutions of journalists and attacks on nonviolent demonstrators, led to the 2012 protests. As part of a compromise, Morsi rescinded the decrees. A new constitution was approved by approximately two-thirds of voters in the referendum, although turnout was less than a third of the electorate.

In June 2013, protests calling for Morsi's resignation erupted. The military, backed by the political opposition and leading religious figures, stepped in and deposed Morsi in a coup. It suspended the constitution and appointed Adly Mansour as interim president. Pro-Morsi demonstrations were crushed, resulting in over 800 deaths. Egyptian prosecutors then charged Morsi with various crimes and sought the death penalty, a move denounced by Amnesty International as "a charade based on null and void procedures". His death sentence was overturned in November 2016 and a retrial ordered. Morsi died during trial on 17 June 2019 amid claims that he was being denied appropriate medical care while in custody.

== Early life and education ==
Mohamed Morsi was born in the Sharqia Governorate, in northern Egypt, of modest provincial origin, in the village of El Adwah, north of Cairo, on 8 August 1951 during the final years of the Egyptian monarchy. His father was a farmer and his mother a housewife. He was the eldest of five brothers, and told journalists that he remembered being taken to school on the back of a donkey. In the late 1960s, he moved to Cairo to study at Cairo University, and earned a BSc in engineering with high honors in 1975. He fulfilled his military service in the Egyptian Army from 1975 to 1976, serving in the chemical warfare unit. He then resumed his studies at Cairo University and earned an MS in metallurgical engineering in 1978. After completing his master's degree, Morsi earned a government scholarship that enabled him to study in the United States. He received a PhD in materials science from the University of Southern California in 1982 with his dissertation on aluminium oxide.

== Academic and engineering career ==
While living in the United States, Morsi became an assistant professor at California State University, Northridge from 1982 to 1985.

In 1985, Morsi quit his job at CSUN and returned to Egypt, becoming a professor at Zagazig University, where he was appointed head of the engineering department. Morsi was a lecturer at Zagazig University's engineering department until 2010.

== Political career ==
Morsi was first elected to parliament in 2000. He served as a Member of Parliament from 2000 to 2005, officially as an independent candidate because the Brotherhood was technically barred from running candidates for office under President Hosni Mubarak. He was a member of the Guidance Office of the Muslim Brotherhood until the founding of the Freedom and Justice Party in 2011, at which point he was elected by the MB's Guidance Office to be the first president of the new party. While serving in this capacity in 2010, Morsi stated of the Israeli–Palestinian conflict that "the two-state solution is nothing but a delusion concocted by the brutal usurper of the Palestinian lands."

Morsi condemned the September 11 attacks as a "horrific crime against innocent civilians". However, he accused the United States of using the 9/11 attacks as a pretext for invading Afghanistan and Iraq, and claimed that the U.S. had not provided “evidence” that the attackers were Muslims. He also stated that the aircraft collision alone did not bring down the World Trade Center, suggesting something "happened from the inside." Such views are held by most Egyptians, including Egyptian liberals. His comments drew criticism in the United States.

=== 2011 detention ===
Morsi was arrested along with 24 other Muslim Brotherhood leaders on 28 January 2011. He escaped from prison in Cairo two days later. The Wadi el-Natroun Prison break received widespread news coverage within hours of its occurrence, with some reports indicating the political prisoners were sprung from detention by "armed gangs" taking advantage of the chaos of the Egyptian Revolution.

Four years later, Morsi faced trial for his role in the prison break. He and 105 others were sentenced to death on 16 May 2015. The court of cassation overturned the death sentence on Morsi and five others and then ordered retrials.

=== 2012 Egyptian presidential campaign ===
After Khairat El-Shater was disqualified from the 2012 presidential election, Morsi, who was initially nominated as a backup candidate, emerged as the new Muslim Brotherhood candidate. His campaign was supported by well-known Egyptian cleric Safwat Hegazi at a rally in El-Mahalla El-Kubra, the epicentre of Egyptian worker protests.

Following the first round of Egypt's first post-Mubarak presidential elections, where exit polls suggested a 25.5 percent share of the vote for Morsi, he was officially announced as the president on 24 June 2012, following a subsequent run-off vote. Morsi supporters in Cairo's Tahrir Square celebrated, and angry outbursts occurred at the Egypt Election Authorities press conference when the result was announced. He came in slightly ahead of former Mubarak-era prime minister Ahmed Shafik, and Morsi’s campaign was noted for the Islamist character of its events. From the initial round of voting on 23 and 24 May 2012, Morsi had attempted to appeal to political liberals and minorities while portraying his rival Ahmed Shafik as a holdover from the Mubarak-era of secular moderation.

On 30 May 2012, Morsi filed a lawsuit against Egyptian television presenter Tawfiq Okasha, accusing him of "intentional falsehoods and accusations that amount to defamation and slander." According to the online newspaper Egypt Independent, an English-language subsidiary of Egyptian daily Al-Masry Al-Youm, Okasha spent three hours on 27 May 2012 criticizing the Muslim Brotherhood and Morsi on air. After Okasha aired a video allegedly depicting Tunisian Islamist extremists executing a Christian while asking "how will such people govern?", some analysts suggested that this was regarding Morsi's Muslim Brotherhood party. The Tunisian government characterized the video as a farce in a harshly worded statement.

On 24 June 2012, Morsi was announced as the winner of the election with 51.73 percent of the vote. Almost immediately afterward, he resigned from the presidency of the Freedom and Justice Party.

=== Opinions ===
==== On changing the government ====
I hope the people will choose me, an Islamist candidate from the Freedom & Justice party and Muslim Brotherhood, and God willing the system will move towards stability and development.

—

He didn't say what he wanted the army to be like after saying that no entity will be above the constitution. He suggested that parliament should control the army's spending, but that some parts of it should be kept secret. The Freedom & Justice Party would respect the Constitution of Egypt and not impose what they believe on people, he said. He said that Egyptians are committed to living in a society with full rights for everyone. The 2011 revolution was triggered by an "Islamic awakening" in the region, according to him.

==== On Islamic society and non-Muslims in Egypt ====
Morsi said Coptic Christians "are certainly just as Egyptian as I am, and have as much a right to this homeland as I do." He said freedom of religion is a right granted by Allah and sharia commands Muslims to respect the rights of non-Muslim compatriots. However, in real terms the condition of Egyptian religious minorities such as Shia Muslims and Christians steadily deteriorated during the rule of the Sunni Muslim Brotherhood government (and affiliated with it president Morsi).

==== On economy ====
Morsi also compared free markets to the Islamic system, but said Islam requires there to be an ethical component to ensure that the poor share in society's wealth.

== Presidency ==
Morsi was sworn in on 30 June 2012, as Egypt's first democratically elected president. He succeeded Hosni Mubarak, who left the office of the President of Egypt vacant after being forced to resign on 11 February 2011.

=== Domestic policy ===
Morsi reconvened Parliament in its original form on 10 July 2012; this was expected to cause friction between him and the military officials who dissolved the legislature.

Morsi sought to influence the drafting of a new constitution of Egypt, favoring a constitution which protects civil rights and enshrines Islamic law.

In a speech to supporters in Cairo's Tahrir Square on 30 June 2012, Morsi briefly mentioned that he would work to free Omar Abdel-Rahman, convicted of the 1993 bombing of the World Trade Center in New York City, along with the many Egyptians who were arrested during the revolution. A Brotherhood spokesperson later said that the extradition was for humanitarian reasons and that Morsi did not intend to overturn Abdel-Rahman's criminal convictions.

On 10 July 2012, Morsi reinstated the Islamist-dominated parliament that was disbanded by the Supreme Constitutional Court of Egypt on 14 June 2012. According to Egypt's official news agency, Morsi ordered the immediate return of legislators elected in 2011, many of whom are members of Morsi's Freedom and Justice Party and other Islamist groups. A Morsi spokesman announced that the president-elect would appoint a Christian and a woman as vice-presidents, but eventually appointed Mahmoud Mekki, a Muslim man. On 22 December 2012, Mekki resigned.

After Kamal Ganzouri's resignation, Morsi tasked Hesham Qandil with forming the new government. On 2 August 2012, Qandil was sworn in as prime minister. Morsi also objected to a constitutional provision limiting presidential power.

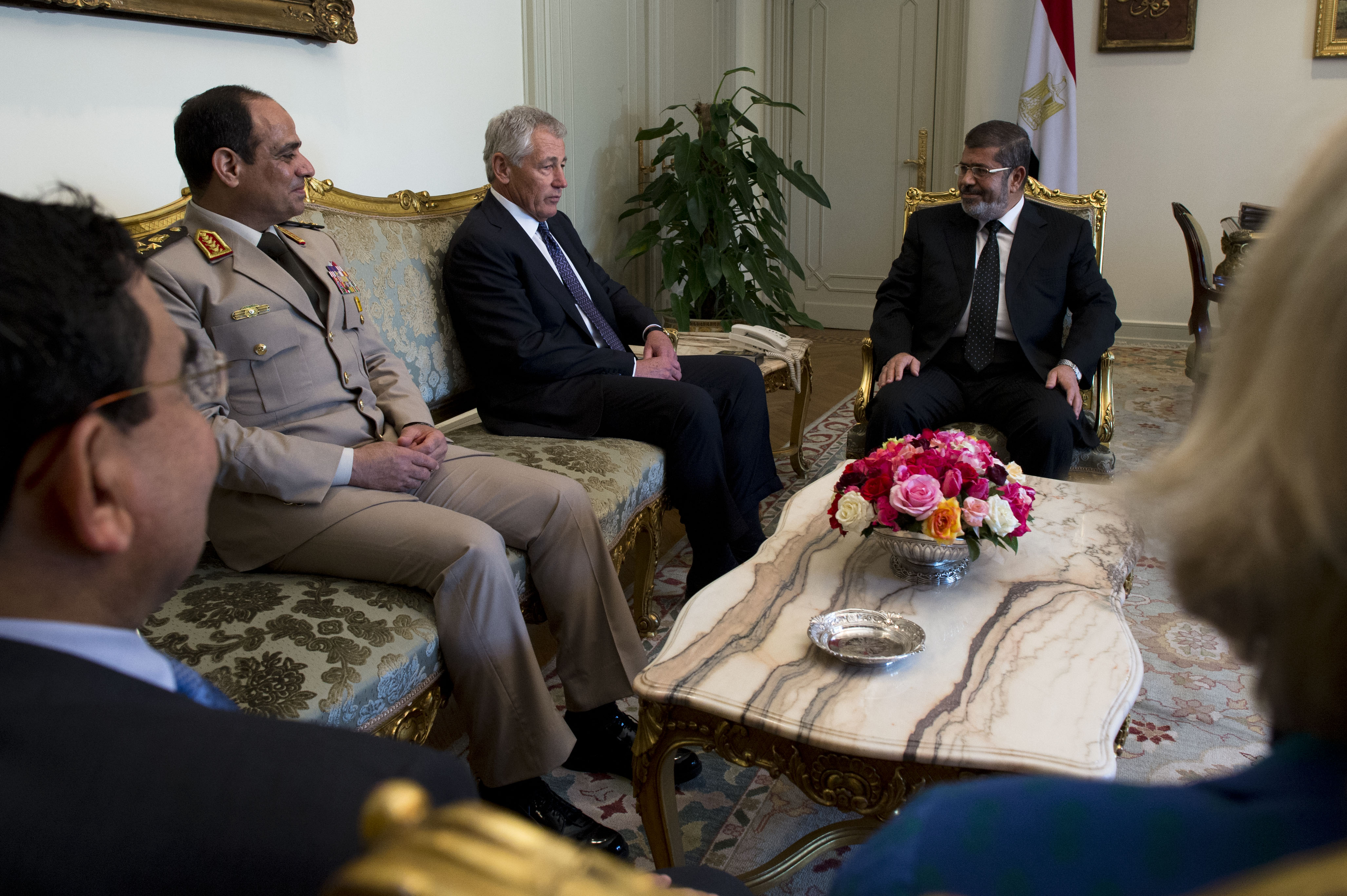
Then President Mohamed Morsi (right) and General el-Sisi (left) listen to visiting U.S. Secretary of Defense Chuck Hagel (center), during a meeting with U.S. officials on 24 April 2013. el-Sisi, chosen by Morsi to be the first post-Mubarak era Defense Minister, would later sanction the removal of Morsi.

On 12 August 2012, Morsi asked Mohamad Hussein Tantawi, head of the country's armed forces, and Sami Hafez Anan, the Army chief of staff, to resign. He also announced that the constitutional amendments passed by the Supreme Council of the Armed Forces (SCAF) restricting the president's powers would be annulled. Morsi's spokesman, Yasser Ali, announced that both Tantawi and Anan would remain advisers to the president. Morsi named Abdel Fattah el-Sisi, who was then serving as chief of military intelligence, as Egypt's new defense minister. The New York Times described the move as an "upheaval" and a "stunning purge", given the power that SCAF had taken after the fall of Mubarak. Al Jazeera described it as "escalating the power struggle" between the president and military. On 14 August 2012, Mohamed Salem, an Egyptian lawyer, filed a legal challenge over Morsi's removal of Tantawi and Anan, arguing that Morsi planned to bring back the totalitarian regime.

Morsi fired two more high-ranking security officials on 16 August 2012: intelligence chief Murad Muwafi the Director of the Intelligence Directorate and the commander of his presidential guards.

On 27 August 2012, Morsi named 21 advisers and aides in a slew that included three women and two Christians and numerous Islamist-leaning figures. He also appointed new governors to the 27 regions of the country.

In October 2012, Morsi's government unveiled plans for the development of a major economic and industrial hub adjoining the Suez Canal. Funding commitments had been received, including $8 billion from Qatar. The European Bank for Reconstruction and Development committed €1 billion. On 19 March 2013, on a visit to India, Morsi sought support from India's Prime Minister Manmohan Singh. Although the project did not proceed under Morsi, his successor Abdel Fattah el-Sisi revived and launched a streamlined version of the corridor with an expansion of the Suez Canal in August 2014.

On 19 October 2012, Morsi travelled to Egypt's northwestern Matrouh in his first official visit to deliver a speech on Egyptian unity at el-Tenaim Mosque. Immediately before his speech, he participated in prayers there where he openly mouthed "Amen" as cleric Futouh Abd Al-Nabi Mansour, the local head of religious endowment, declared, "Deal with the Jews and their supporters. Oh Allah, disperse them, rend them asunder. Oh Allah, demonstrate Your might and greatness upon them. Show us Your omnipotence, oh Lord." The prayers were broadcast on Egyptian state television and translated by MEMRI. Originally, MEMRI translated the broadcast as "Destroy the Jews and their supporters. Oh Allah, disperse them, rend them asunder," but later revised their translation.

Morsi did not attend the enthronement of Coptic Pope Tawadros II on 18 November 2012 at Abbasiya Cathedral, though Prime Minister Hesham Qandil did attend.

==== November 2012 declaration ====
On 22 November 2012, Morsi issued a declaration which purported to protect the work of the Constituent Assembly drafting the new constitution from judicial interference. In effect, this declaration immunized his actions from any legal challenge. The decree states that it only applied until a new constitution is ratified. The declaration also required a retrial of those accused in the Mubarak-era killings of protesters, who had been acquitted, and extends the mandate of the Constituent Assembly by two months. Additionally, the declaration authorized Morsi to take any measures necessary to protect the revolution. Liberal and secular groups walked out of the constitutional Constituent Assembly because they believed that it would impose strict Islamic practices, while members of the Muslim Brotherhood supported Morsi.

The move was criticized by Mohamed ElBaradei who said Morsi had "usurped all state powers and appointed himself Egypt's new pharaoh". The move led to massive protests and violent action throughout Egypt, with protesters erecting tents in Tahrir Square, the site of the protests that preceded the resignation of Hosni Mubarak. The protesters demanded a reversal of the declaration and the dissolution of the Constituent Assembly. Those gathered in the square called for a "huge protest" on 27 November. Clashes were reported between protesters and police. The declaration was also condemned by human rights groups such as Amnesty International, Human Rights Watch and Freedom House. Egypt's highest body of judges decried the ruling as an "unprecedented assault on the independence of the judiciary and its rulings". Abdel Meguid Mahmoud, a prosecutor appointed by Hosni Mubarak, declared the decree "null and void." Morsi further emphasized his argument that the decree is temporary, and said he wanted dialog with the opposition. Morsi's statement failed to appease either the judges or citizenry dissatisfied with his decision and sparked days of protests in Tahrir Square.

Though the declaration's language had not been altered, Morsi agreed to limit the scope of the decree to "sovereign matters" following four days of opposition protests and the resignation of several senior advisers. Morsi's spokesman said an agreement, reached with top judicial authorities, would leave most of the president's actions subject to review by the courts, but preserve his power to protect the Constituent Assembly from being dissolved by the courts before it had finished its work. President Morsi also agreed there would be no further retrials of former officials under Hosni Mubarak, unless new evidence was presented.

On 1 December 2012, the Constituent Assembly handed the draft constitution to Morsi, who announced that a constitutional referendum would be held on 15 December 2012.

On 4 December 2012, Morsi left his presidential palace after a number of protesters broke through police cordons around the palace, with some climbing atop an armored police vehicle and waving flags.

On 8 December 2012, Morsi annulled his decree that had expanded his presidential authority and removed judicial review of his decrees, an Islamist official said, but added that the effects of that declaration would stand. A constitutional referendum was still planned for 15 December. George Isaac of the Constitution Party said that Morsi's declaration did not offer anything new, the National Salvation Front rejected it as an attempt to save face, and the 6 April Movement and Gamal Fahmi of the Egyptian Journalists Syndicate said the new declaration failed to address the "fundamental" problem of the nature of the Assembly that was tasked with drafting the constitution.

=== Foreign policy ===
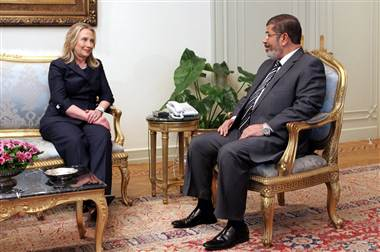
Mohamed Morsi meets with U.S. Secretary of State Hillary Clinton in Cairo, Egypt, July 2012

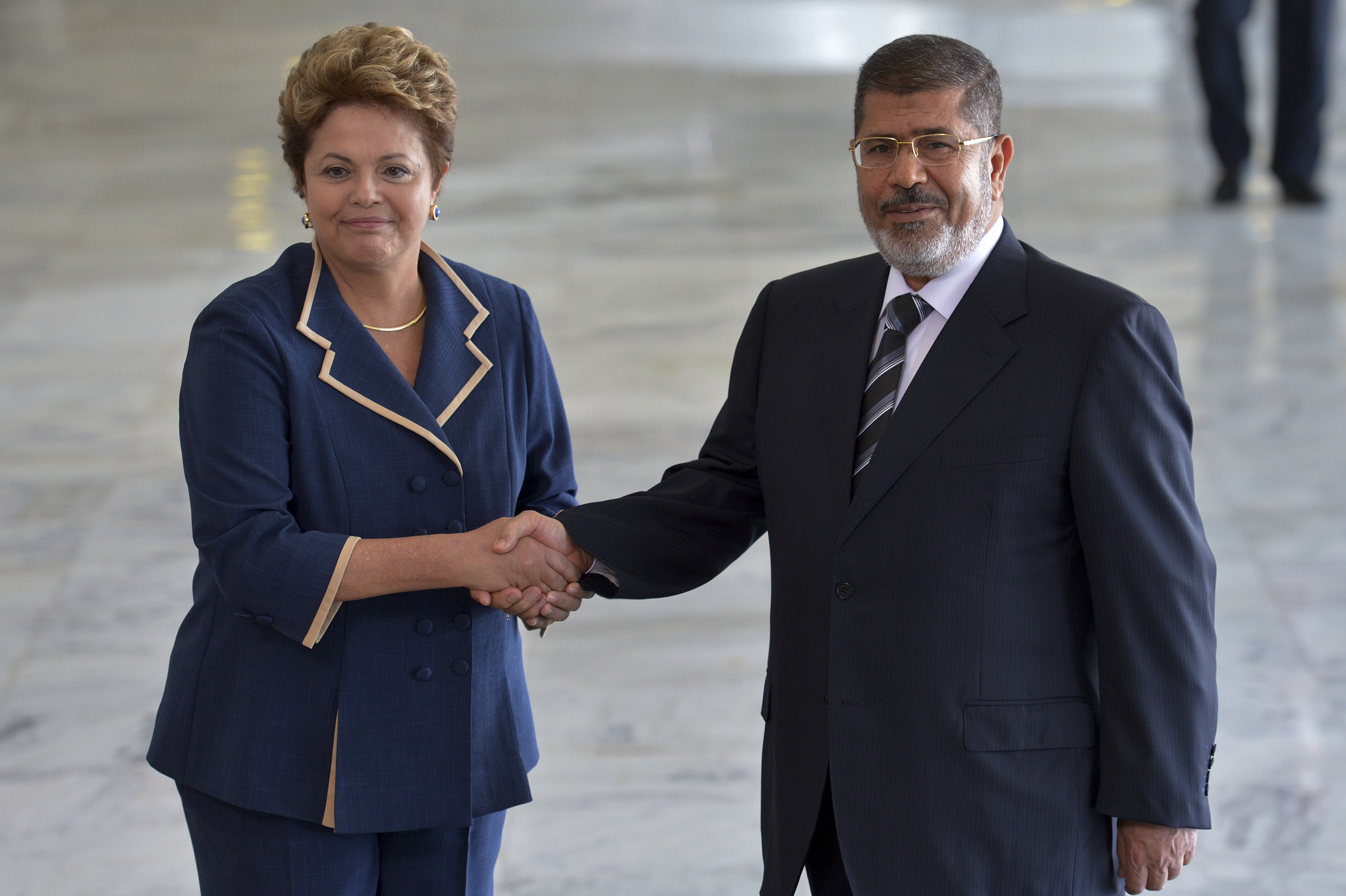
Morsi and Brazilian President Dilma Rousseff in Brasília, Brazil, May 2013

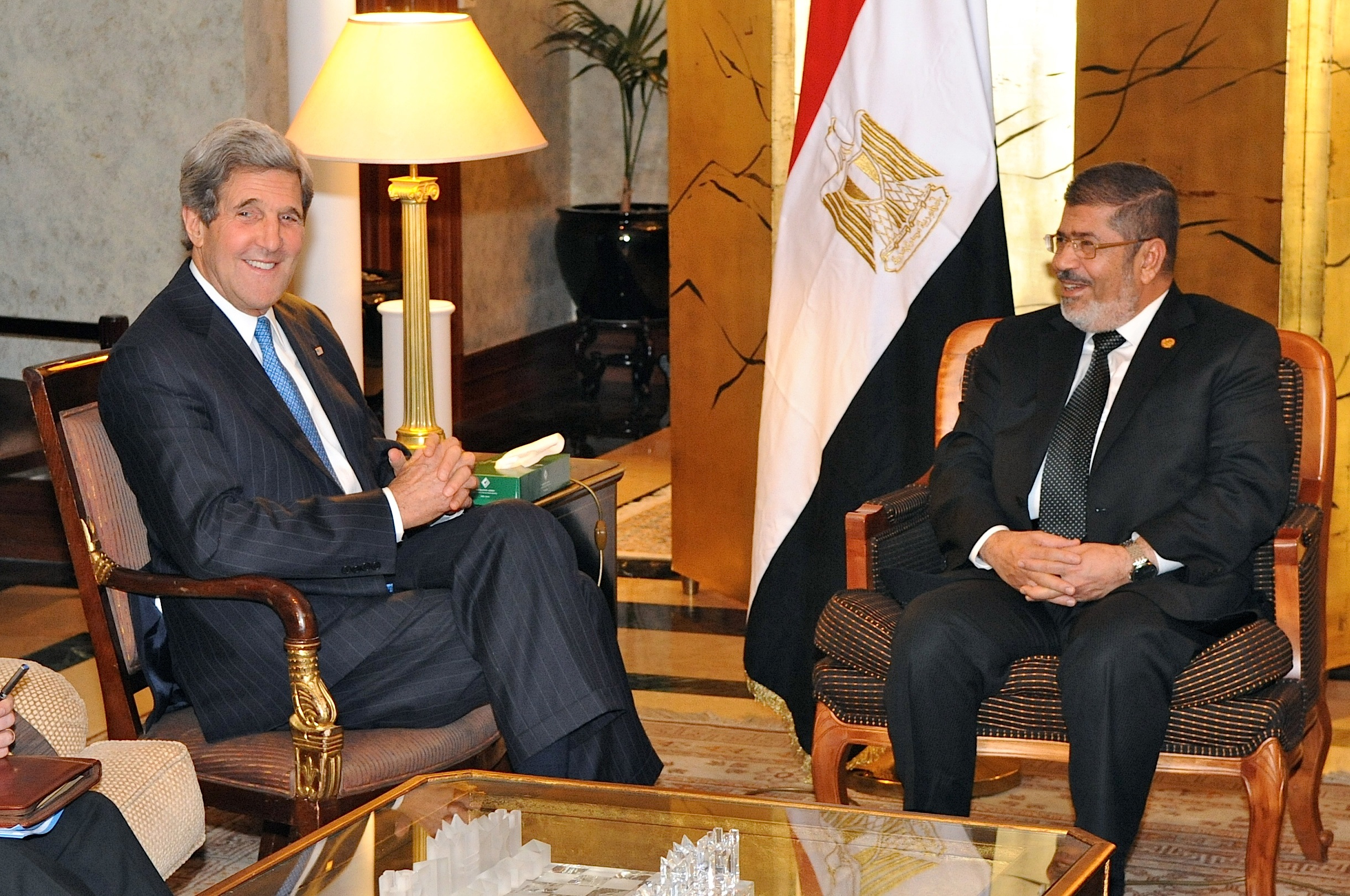
Morsi meets with U.S. Secretary of State John Kerry, 25 May 2013

Khaled al-Qazzaz was the secretary on foreign relations from 2012 to 2013 in the Morsi government.

Morsi hosted the Islamic summit in Cairo, with the participation of 57 leaders from Muslim nations. The statement urged a "substantial dialogue" between the Syrian government and the Syrian opposition to bring an end to the Syrian civil war.

Morsi bestowed upon Ekmeleddin İhsanoğlu, the Secretary-General of the Organisation of Islamic Cooperation (OIC), the Order of the Nile, which is Egypt's most prestigious state award.

==== China ====
Morsi sought to strengthen ties with China to diversify Egypt's international partnerships beyond traditional Western allies. Facing economic challenges and political isolation from the U.S. and Europe, Morsi's government viewed China as a source of investment, infrastructure development, and diplomatic leverage. Egypt aimed to balance its relationships with global powers, engaging China in sectors like energy and transportation while maintaining its longstanding U.S. ties. This pivot reflected desire for greater autonomy and economic stability. Morsi cited China's economic development as a model for Egypt, noting how it had transformed from a developing nation into a global power.

==== Arab world ====
Morsi's first official foreign visit was to Saudi Arabia on 11 July 2012. During this visit, Morsi stated that he intended to strengthen ties with the oil-rich monarchy, which also maintained close ties with the Mubarak government.

Morsi received strong support from Qatar, which has maintained long-held ties with the Muslim Brotherhood, of which Morsi was a member until his election. Qatar declared that it would provide Egypt with US$2 billion just as Morsi announced the reshuffle in the cabinet on 12 August 2012. Meanwhile, investors from Qatar pledged to invest $10 billion US in Egyptian infrastructure.

At the same time, Morsi faced opposition from a number of Arab leaders, including Jordan's King Abdullah II, who described Morsi as having 'no depth' and the Muslim Brotherhood in Egypt as 'a Masonic cult' and 'wolves in sheep's clothing.' During Morsi's rule, Jordan also deported hundreds of Egyptian migrant workers in an attempt to gain political concessions from Egypt.

==== Syria ====
As a staunch supporter of the opposition forces in the Syrian civil war, Morsi attended an Islamist rally on 15 June 2013, where Salafi clerics called for jihad in Syria and denounced supporters of Bashar al-Assad as "infidels." Morsi, who announced at the rally that his government had expelled Syria's ambassador and closed the Syrian embassy in Cairo, called for international intervention on behalf of the opposition forces in the effect of an establishment of a no-fly zone.

Although he did not explicitly call for Egyptians to join the opposition armed forces in the Syrian conflict, Morsi's attendance at 15 June rally was seen by many to be an implicit nod-of-approval for the Islamist clerics' calls for jihad in Syria. Morsi was criticized by Egyptian analysts for attending and speaking at the rally, while the Supreme Council of the Armed Forces (SCAF) released a statement the day after the rally saying that its only role is to protect Egypt's borders, in an apparent ruling out of support for intervention in Syria. Morsi's attendance at the rally was later revealed to be a major factor in the largely secular SCAF's decision to side with anti-Morsi protesters over the Morsi government during the widespread June 2013 anti-Morsi protests.

Up to 100,000 Syrian refugees arrived in Egypt following Morsi's inauguration as president. The government under Morsi also supported Syrian refugees living in Egypt by offering residency permits, assistance on finding employment, allowing Syrian refugee children to register in state schools and access to other public services.

==== Iran ====
During his tenure, Morsi strengthened ties with Iran, following pre-revolutionary years of animosity between the two countries. However, his actions were met with Sunni Muslim opposition both inside and outside of Egypt.

Morsi attended the 16th Summit of the Non-Aligned Movement in Tehran at the end of August 2012; a visit which had the potential to catalyze improved relations between Egypt and member nations of the group who strongly objected to Egypt's decision to make peace with Israel in 1979. At the summit, Morsi made a speech against the Syrian government and called on the Syrian opposition to unite during the Civil War. These remarks however, were not covered clearly by the Iranian media. Morsi sparked controversy saying that it is an "ethical duty" to support the Syrian people against the "oppressive regime" in Damascus. In response, the Syrian delegation walked out while Syrian FM Walid Muallem accused Morsi of "inciting the shedding of Syrian blood."

==== Israel and Palestine ====
In October 2012, Morsi wrote a friendly letter to then Israeli president Shimon Peres. The letter largely followed standard diplomatic language. Morsi called Peres "a great and good friend" and went on to call for "maintaining and strengthening the cordial relations which so happily exist between our two countries." Morsi closed the letter by expressing the "highest esteem and consideration." Gamal Muhammad Heshmat asserted that the letter was "fabricated" saying that "Zionist media have leaked baseless statements by Morsi in the past." However, Morsi spokesman Yasser Ali told Egyptian state-run newspaper Al-Ahram that the letter was "100 percent correct". Previously, in July 2012, Morsi had refuted a fabricated letter.

Morsi said in his victory speech that he would honor all of Egypt's international treaties, which was thought to be a reference to Egypt's treaty with Israel.

Morsi's government condemned the Operation Pillar of Defense and called for a ceasefire. Morsi sent Prime Minister Hesham Qandil to Gaza to express solidarity with Gaza and Hamas, a stark contrast to Hosni Mubarak's treatment of Hamas as an enemy in the 2008–09 Gaza War. Egypt, along with the United States mediated the ceasefire with Hamas and Israel.

==== Statements on Israel and Israelis ====
In January 2013, statements made by Morsi in 2010 gained wide attention in the Western media, following a report in Forbes magazine on 11 January that criticized big media outlets for having ignored it. In videos posted by MEMRI, Morsi had declared "The Zionists have no right to the land of Palestine. There is no place for them on the land of Palestine. What they took before 1947–48 constitutes plunder, and what they are doing now is a continuation of this plundering. By no means do we recognize their Green Line. The land of Palestine belongs to the Palestinians, not to the Zionists." In September 2010, calling the Israelis "blood-suckers", "warmongers" and "descendants of apes and pigs", Morsi said "These futile [Israeli-Palestinian] negotiations are a waste of time and opportunities. As the Palestinians, the Arabs, and the Muslims lose time and opportunities, the Zionists gain more opportunities and lose nothing out of it. We can see how this dream has dissipated. This dream has always been an illusion... This [Palestinian] Authority was created by the Zionist and American enemies for the sole purpose of opposing the will of the Palestinian people and its interests." White House spokesman Jay Carney tried to downplay Morsi's remarks, saying that U.S. policy is focused on actions, not words. Morsi later contended that his remarks were "taken out of context", and his exchange with a delegation headed by John McCain was made public:

Morsi told the delegation he was committed to freedom of religion and belief, his spokesman said, adding: "his Excellency [Morsi] pointed out the need to distinguish between the Jewish religion, and those who are its, and violent actions against defenceless Palestinians."

—

During a visit to Germany in January 2013, Morsi again stated that his remarks were taken out of context, insisting that they were intended as a criticism of Israel's policies toward the Palestinians. Addressing reporters, Morsi stated that "[I am] not against the Jewish faith or the Jewish people. My comments were about conduct that sheds blood and kills innocent people – things neither I... nor anyone condones... My comments were about the conduct and manners, the killings and the aggression by tanks and warplanes and cluster bombs and internationally banned weapons against innocent people". Morsi also stated that "[I] cannot be against the Jewish faith or Jews or Christianity and Christians," pointing out that the Quran requires Muslims "to believe in all religions".

==== Ethiopia ====
Morsi attended the African Union Summit in Addis Ababa from 15 to 16 July 2012; this was the first visit to Ethiopia by a sitting President of Egypt in the 17 years since the attempted assassination of Hosni Mubarak in June 1995.

Later, in June 2013, politicians called by Morsi were overheard suggesting attacking Ethiopia to stop it from building a dam on a Nile tributary.

== Overthrow ==
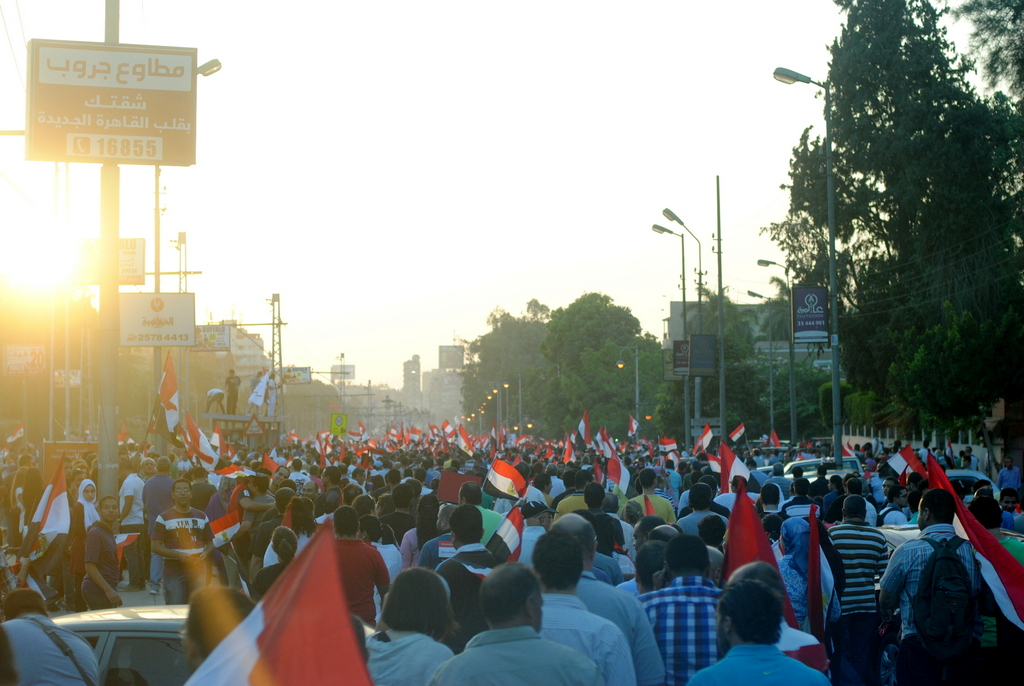
Anti-Morsi demonstrators marching in Cairo, 28 June 2013

On 30 June 2013, protests across Egypt erupted calling for President Morsi's resignation from office. Concurrently with these anti-Morsi demonstrations, his supporters held a sit-in in Rabaa Al-Adawiya square.

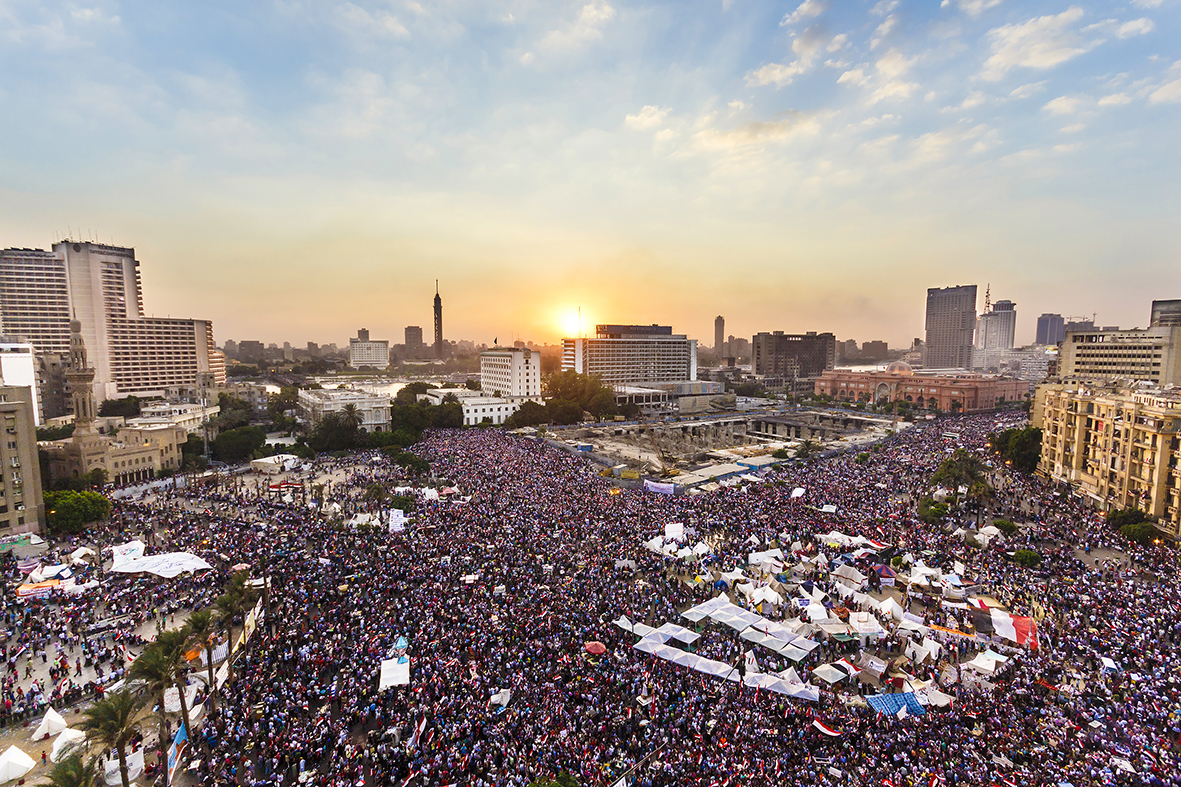
Mass protests in Cairo's Tahrir square, during the "June Revolution", which called for Morsi's immediate resignation.

On 1 July, the Egyptian Armed Forces issued a 48-hour ultimatum that gave the country's political parties until 3 July to meet the demands of the Egyptian people. The Egyptian military also threatened to intervene if the dispute was not resolved by then. Four Ministers also resigned on the same day, including tourism minister Hisham Zazou, communication and IT minister Atef Helmi, state minister for legal and parliamentary affairs Hatem Bagato and state minister for environmental affairs Khaled Abdel Aal, leaving the government with members of the Muslim Brotherhood only.

On 2 July, President Morsi publicly rejected the Egyptian Army's 48-hour ultimatum and vowed to pursue his own plans for national reconciliation and resolving the political crisis.

On 3 July, Morsi was put under house arrest, and was believed to be at the Republican Guard barracks. According to other sources he was taken to a military base and his travel was restricted. Army troops and tanks were reported to have surrounded key facilities and installations. At noon, the Republican Guard, who had Morsi in their care, left his side to allow Army commandos to take him to an undisclosed Ministry of Defence building. He offered no resistance. Abdel Fattah el-Sisi announced a road map for the future and announced that Adly Mansour, the head of the Constitutional Court, had been appointed as interim President of Egypt.

On 8 July, Prime Minister Qandil, after initially deciding to remain in his position until the formation of a new government, submitted his resignation effective immediately in protest of the subsequent bloodshed of the recent coup d'état when 51 protesters were killed by the military at the Republican Guard headquarters.

In mid-November, Morsi claimed that he was kidnapped and held in a Republican Guard house on 2 July. He said that he had been kept there until 5 July and forcibly moved again to a naval base where he spent the next four months. The spokesperson of the Egyptian Armed Forces, Colonel Ahmed Ali, later denied the rumors that Morsi was badly treated, saying that they had nothing to hide. The Egyptian Army later gave the Baroness Ashton of Upholland, First Vice-President of the European Commission and the High Representative of the Union for Foreign Affairs and Security Policy for the European Union, permission to meet Morsi. Ashton later stated that Morsi is doing well, saying "Morsi was keeping up with the latest developments in the country through television and newspapers. So we were able to talk about the situation, and we were able to talk about the need to move forward. The people around him do care for him. I looked at the facilities." Morsi later met with an African Union delegation.

== Post-overthrow trial and imprisonment ==
After his overthrow, Morsi faced several charges including inciting the killing of opponents protesting outside his palace, espionage for foreign militant groups including Hamas, Hezbollah and Iran's Islamic Revolutionary Guard Corps (IRGC), for escaping Wadi el-Natroun Prison during the 2011 revolution before his election as president, leaking classified documents to Qatar, in addition to "insulting the judiciary."

On 1 September 2013, prosecutors referred Morsi to trial on charges of inciting deadly violence. The date was set for 4 November 2013. Morsi was to be tried in a criminal court for inciting his supporters to kill at least 10 opponents, use violence and torture protesters. The prosecutors' investigation revealed that Morsi had asked the Republican Guard and the minister of interior to break up his opponents' sit-in, but they refused, fearing a bloody result, before Morsi's aides asked his supporters to break up the sit-in with force.

On 18 December 2013, Prosecutor General Hisham Barakat ordered the referral of Morsi to criminal court on charges of espionage, in a report headed "The Biggest Case of Espionage in the History of Egypt". According to the Prosecutor General's investigations, the international organization of the Muslim Brotherhood, aided by Hezbollah and Hamas, is the reason behind violence inside Egypt. The Brotherhood intended to create a state of ultimate chaos by smuggling jihadists into Gaza via secret tunnels to receive media and military training and then send the jihadists into the Sinai to implement this training.

On 29 January 2014, Morsi faced trial for the second time on the charge of breaking out of jail during the Egyptian Revolution of 2011, after conspiring with foreign militant groups, including Hamas, to spread violent chaos throughout Egypt. The trial was postponed for a month on 1 February 2014, and was resumed on charges of inciting deadly violence. The trial was adjourned to the next day to hear witnesses for the prosecution, and was then repeatedly postponed.

In April 2015, the court convicted Morsi, along with 12 other defendants, including former MP Mohamed Beltagy, for the arrest and torture of protesters and incitement to violence. All defendants were acquitted of murder charges. The judge handed down 20-year sentences for Morsi and the others who were convicted. Morsi still faced separate trials for espionage, terrorism, and prison-break charges and was sentenced to death on 16 May along with other defendants. The death penalty was imposed on Morsi and 105 others for their role in the Wadi el-Natrun prison break of January 2011. In accordance with Egypt's penal code, the sentence was referred to the Grand Mufti, whose assent or dissent is legally non-binding.

Amnesty International denounced the court process as "a charade based on null and void procedures." Turkish President Recep Tayyip Erdoğan criticized Egypt and accused Western countries of hypocrisy, "While the West is abolishing the death penalty, they are just watching the continuation of death sentences in Egypt."

In June 2016, Morsi was given a life sentence for passing state secrets to Qatar. He was one of the defendants in the case along with two Al-Jazeera journalists who were sentenced to death in absentia.

In November 2016, the court of cassation overturned Morsi's death penalty on the spying charges together with those of five other Muslim Brotherhood members. The same court was to review two other charges against Morsi for his role in the January 2011 prison break, as well as for allegedly providing classified information to the government of Qatar.

=== Imprisonment ===
After his ouster, Morsi was held in Tora Prison, in a special wing nicknamed Scorpion Prison. A detention review panel, consisting of UK Members of Parliament and senior lawyers including Crispin Blunt, Edward Faulks and Paul Williams, reviewed Morsi's detention conditions. Based on the testimonies of Morsi's family and others informed of his condition, the panel noted that he received inadequate medical care for diabetes, called his treatment "cruel, inhuman and degrading" and said it could "meet the threshold for torture in accordance [with] Egyptian and international law". According to his sons, his health had deteriorated significantly after his imprisonment.

== Personal life ==
Morsi married his cousin, Naglaa Ali Mahmoud, in 1979. She reportedly stated that she did not want to be referred to as "First Lady" but rather as "First Servant [of the Egyptian public]".

Morsi had five children: Ahmed Mohammed Morsi, who is a physician in Saudi Arabia; Shaima, a graduate of Zagazig University; Osama, an attorney; Omar who holds a bachelor in commerce from Zagazig University; and Abdullah, who was said to have died from a heart attack while driving his car on 4 September 2019, but his lawyers said on 7 September 2020 that he was killed after being injected with a lethal substance. Two of Morsi's five children were born in California and are U.S. citizens by birth. Morsi has three grandchildren. His third son, Omar, was appointed to the Holding Company for Airports, a state-owned company, six months after his graduation. However, he declined the job offer due to many rumors and attacks in the media and press.

== Awards ==
On his state visit to Pakistan, Morsi was awarded an honorary Doctorate of Philosophy (PhD) by the National University of Sciences and Technology (NUST) in Islamabad, Pakistan on 18 March 2013 in recognition of his achievements and significant contributions towards the promotion of peace and harmony in the world and strengthening of relations with the Muslim countries, especially in Pakistan.

== Death ==
Egyptian state television announced on 17 June 2019 that Morsi had collapsed during a court hearing on espionage charges at Cairo's Tora Prison complex, and later died suddenly, reportedly of a heart attack. His lawyer reported that Morsi was allowed to speak for seven minutes from inside the glass box before the session was adjourned. His final words were a verse from a poem that read "My country is dear even if it oppressed me and my people are honourable even if they were unjust to me". He collapsed a minute after the session ended. He was buried in Cairo alongside other senior figures of the Muslim Brotherhood.

Critics of the Egyptian government blamed the conditions of the trial for Morsi's death, saying that the conditions he was held under were the cause. Mohamed Sudan, a prominent Muslim Brotherhood member based in London, had described his death as "premeditated murder". Crispin Blunt, who had led a panel of British parliamentarians that had reviewed the conditions Morsi was held under in March 2018, said that, "We feared that if Dr. Morsi was not provided with urgent medical assistance, the damage to his health may be permanent and possibly terminal" and that "sadly, we have been proved right."

Turkish President Recep Tayyip Erdoğan blamed the Egyptian leadership for Morsi's death, describing him as a martyr. Religious ceremonies were held in Istanbul.

Mada Masr reported that the Egyptian government had imposed censorship on coverage of Morsi's death, including requiring newspapers to use a brief, identically worded account with no reference to his presidency, nor any allegations surrounding responsibility for his death. They were also told not to place the story on their front pages. Almost all Egyptian newspapers complied with the order, but Al-Masry Al-Youm placed the story on their front page, and did mention his presidency.

== Legacy ==
In October 2020, more than a year after his death, Turkish aid agencies established the "Mohamed Morsi Orphanage" in Idlib, Syria. The Turkish government's Disaster and Emergency Management Presidency (AFAD) opened the orphanage in Idlib's Mashhad Rouhin district, together with Ozgur-Deir and Fetihder Associations. It is planned to house orphaned children and their families in the city.

== See also ==
- Elections in Egypt
- Politics of Egypt
- List of political parties in Egypt
- Timeline of the Egyptian Crisis under the SCAF
- 2012–2013 Egyptian protests

== Notes ==
Assembly seats
Preceded by Numan Gumaa	Member of the People's Assembly; 2000–2005	Succeeded by Mahmoud Abaza
Party political offices
New office	Leader of the Freedom and Justice Party; 2011–2012	Succeeded by Saad El-Katatni
Political offices
Preceded by Mohamed Hussein Tantawi; Acting	President of Egypt; 2012–2013	Succeeded by Adly Mansour; Acting
Diplomatic posts
Preceded by Mohamed Hussein Tantawi; Acting	Secretary General of the Non-Aligned Movement; 2012	Succeeded by Mahmoud Ahmadinejad
