= Ahmad ibn Muhammad al-Maydani =

- أحمد بن محمد الميداني
- Born: 11th century Nishapur, Seljuk Empire
- Died: 27 October 1124 (518 AH); Nishapur, Seljuk Empire
- Era: Islamic Golden Age
- Writing career
- Notable works: Majma' al-Amthal (مجمع الأمثال); Al-Sami fi al-Asami (السامي في الأسامي); Nuzhat al-Taraf fi Ilm al-Sarf (نزهة الطرف في علم الصرف)

Abu ʾl-Faḍl Aḥmad ibn Muḥammad ibn Aḥmad ibn Ibrāhīm al-Naysābūrī al-Maydānī (died 27 October 1124) was an Arab scholar in Persia, an expert on Arabic philology and on Islamic adab (etiquette).

Little is known of al-Maydānī's life. He was a native of Nishapur (Arabic Naysābūr) and took his surnames from his place of residence off the maydān Ziyād. He was educated in Nishapur under the Qurʾānic scholars Abu ʾl-Ḥasan al-Wāḥidī (died 1076), Yaʿqūb ibn Aḥmad al-Kurdī and ʿAlī al-Mujāshiʿī al-Farazdaqī. He in turn taught Abu ʾl-Ḥasan al-Bayhaqī. He died on 27 October 1124 and was buried in the cemetery of the maydān quarter on 5 November 1124.

Fifteen works by al-Maydānī are known, of which the most famous is the paremiological Majmaʿ al-amthāl, which remains the "most popular collection of classical Arabic proverbs". It was produced around the same time as al-Zamakhsharī's collection in response to a request by the majlis (council) of Muntajab al-Mulk Abū ʿAlī Muḥammad ibn Arslān, the kātib (secretary) of the Sultan Aḥmad Sanjar. Many abridged versions of the Majmaʿ have been made, the first appearing in 1137. An edition with Turkish annotations appeared in 1627 and a full translation in 1877. A Latin translation by Georg Freytag, entitled Arabum Proverbia, was published at Bonn in 1838–1843. At least two versifications have also been made, the first in 1668.

Al-Maydānī's other works include an edition of the rasāʾil (letters) of Manṣūr al-Harawī (died 1048); an Arabic–Persian dictionary, completed in 1104; a critique of al-Jawharī's earlier Arabic dictionary; and various grammatical and philological works and commentaries.

== Bibliography ==
- Sadiq Feidi, Fatina (2016). La sabiduría árabe antigua reflejada en los proverbios de al-Maydānī: traducción y análisis paremiológico de un corpus seleccionado (PDF) (Doctoral thesis). Complutense University of Madrid.
- Sellheim, R. (1991). "al-Maydānī". In Bosworth, C. E.; van Donzel, E. & Pellat, Ch. (eds.). The Encyclopaedia of Islam, Second Edition. Volume VI: Mahk–Mid. Leiden: E. J. Brill. pp. 913–914. ISBN 978-90-04-08112-3.
