= Cousin marriage in the Middle East =

Consanguineous relationships in the Middle East

Global prevalence of consanguinity up to second cousins or closer

Cousin marriage is a form of consanguinity (marriages among couples who are related as second cousins or closer). While consanguinity is not unique to the Arab world, Arab countries have had "some of the highest rates of consanguineous marriages in the world". The bint 'amm marriage, or marriage with one's father's brother's daughter (bint al-'amm) is especially common, especially in tribal and traditional Muslim communities, where men and women seldom meet potential spouses outside the extended family. Rates of cousin marriage in the Middle East have been found to vary from 29% in Egypt to nearly 58% in Saudi Arabia.

Western anthropologists have debated the significance of the practice; some view it as the defining feature of the Middle Eastern kinship system while others note that overall rates of cousin marriage have varied sharply between different Middle Eastern communities. In pre-modern times rates of cousin marriage were seldom recorded. In recent times, geneticists have warned that the tradition of cousin marriage over centuries has led to increased numbers of people with recessive genetic disorders, due to inbreeding.

== History ==
=== Pre-Islamic ===
Prior to the origins of Islam, cousin marriage was an acceptable practice in the Middle East, according to writings in the Bible. Abraham sent his servant back to his brother to get a wife for his son, Isaac. Isaac eventually married his first cousin once removed, Rebekah (daughter of Bethuel, the son of Nahor, Abraham's brother).

The Persian king Ardashir I of the Sasanian Empire advised his lawyers, secretaries, officers, and husbandmen to "marry near relatives for the sympathy of kinship is kept alive thereby." The same motivation is given in ancient Arabic sources referring to the practice of marriage between paternal cousins prevalent in pre-Islamic Arabia. The Kitab al-Aghani similarly features the story of Qays ibn Dharih, who was not allowed by his father to marry a beautiful maiden from another tribe because, in the words of his father felt that, as a rich and wealthy man, he did not want his son to take the side of a stranger. There is the related consideration that a man who grows up with a cousin in the intimate setting of one extended family knows her and so may develop his own liking or love for her. There is also the benefit of knowing the qualities of the spouse: a Syrian proverb reads, "Ill luck which you know is better than good luck with which you get acquainted." Keeping property in the family is a final reason for cousin marriage. One of the earliest examples of this is the five daughters of Zelophehad from ancient Israel (Numbers 36:10–13) who, upon inheriting from their father, all married their father's brother's sons.

=== Relation with the spread of Islam ===
A 2000 study by Andrey Korotayev found that parallel-cousin (Father's Brother's Daughter – FBD) marriage is likely to be common in areas that were part of the eighth-century Umayyad Caliphate and remained in the Islamic world, i.e., North Africa and the Middle East. Korotayev argues that while there is some functional connection between Islam and FBD marriage, the permission to marry a FBD does not appear to be sufficient to persuade people to actually marry FBD, even if the marriage brings with it economic advantages. According to Korotayev, a systematic acceptance and practice of parallel-cousin marriage took place when Islamized non-Arab groups adopted Arab norms and practices, even if they had no direct connection with Islam, to raise their social standing.

== Religious aspects ==
In the book of Islam, the Quran, Sura An-Nisa gives a fairly detailed list of what sort of marriages are prohibited in Islam, (including "your fathers' sisters, and your mothers' sisters, and brother's daughters, and sister's daughters, and your foster-mothers") but does not include first cousins, and ends by saying: "Lawful to you are all beyond these". Pious Muslims look to the life of the Islamic prophet Muhammad and early Muslims as examples to be followed." One of Muhammad's wives – Zaynab bint Jahsh was the daughter of Muhammad's aunt. However, Muhammad had no children with Zaynab, only with Khadija bint Khuwaylid, and Maria al-Qibtiyya. Ali, Muhammad's cousin and the fourth Rashidun caliph, was married to Muhammad's daughter Fatimah.

The Quranic law dictating that daughters receive a portion of the inheritance appears to have provided a financial incentive to cousin marriage, as the inheritance would remain in the extended family. Answering a 2012 audience question, the Islamic preacher Zakir Naik said that the Quran does not forbid cousin marriage but quotes Dr. Ahmed Sakr as saying that there is a hadith of Muhammad that says: "Do not marry generation after generation among first cousins". The fatwa center at IslamWeb.net was unable to find "any scholar who mentioned" this hadith, and lists several scholars (Al-Qaadhi Al-Husayn, Imaam al-Haramayn (Al-Juwayni), Ibn al-Salah) who have stated the hadith is inauthentic.

== Prevalence in modern times ==
In 2011, it was estimated that intra-familial unions made up up to 20-50% of all marriages in North Africa, Middle East and West Asia.

Besides Muslims, some Jews and Arab Christians in the Middle East have a history of cousin marriage. In addition, some Muslim groups living outside the Middle East, such as expatriate Pakistanis living in England, also practice consanguineous marriage.

=== Arabian Peninsula ===
Raphael Patai reports that in central Arabia, no relaxation of a man's right to the father's brother's daughter (FBD, or paternal female cousin) seems to have taken place in the past hundred years before his 1962 work. Here, the girl is not forced to marry her paternal male cousin, but she cannot marry another unless he gives consent. Among the Jews of Yemen, this rule was also followed, albeit not as rigidly. In northern Arabia the custom is very strong and any outsider wishing to marry a woman must first come to the paternal male cousin, ask his permission, and pay him what he wants, and a man who marries off his daughter without the consent of the paternal male cousin may be killed by family members. The right of the paternal male cousin is such that a shaykh or elder may not be able to prevail against it. Among the Bedouin, it can happen that a paternal male cousin can lodge a complaint after the marriage has taken place, compelling the father to reimburse the bride price or have the marriage annulled. If the paternal male cousin cannot marry his paternal female cousin immediately due to financial or other considerations, the paternal male cousin can also "reserve" her by making a public and formal statement of his intentions to marry her at a future date. A more distant relative acquires priority to marry a girl over her paternal male cousin by reserving her soon after her birth.

In Kuwait, 22.5-64.3% of marriages are consanguineous according to a 2009 study in the journal Reproductive Health. The same study found that the rate in Bahrain was 39-45% of marriages, 56.3% in Oman, and 54% in Qatar. Further research in Qatar showed that the more education and workforce participation a woman has, the less likely it becomes that she will enter into a consanguineous marriage. Other research has estimated that the consanguinity rate is 40% in Saudi Arabia.

=== Egypt ===
As of 2016, about 40% of marriages in Egypt were between cousins. Another source (Reproductive Health) puts the figure at 20.9-32.8% for marriages between blood-related partners as of 2009.

In Egypt, cousin marriage may have been even more prevalent than in Arabia in past periods, with one source from the 1830s observing that it was common among Egyptian Arabs and native Egyptian Muslims, but less so in Cairo, where first cousin marriage accounts for 35 percent of marriages. Reportedly, the husband and wife would continue to call each other "cousin" because the tie of blood was seen as indissoluble, while the marriage was not. In the upper and middle classes, the young man was seldom allowed to see the face of his female cousin after she reached puberty. Cousin marriage is not only practiced by Muslims, but also by some Egyptian Copts in the past, although at a lesser rate (approximately 7-12% of all Coptic marriages). However, despite centuries of most Copts abstaining from cousin marriages, the Coptic Church in 2024 launched an initiative to ban relative marriages completely due to potential health risks. Estimates from the late 19th and early 20th century state variously that either 80 percent of the Egyptian fellahin marry first cousins or two-thirds marry them if they exist. Cousin marriage was also practiced in the Sinai Peninsula, where a girl is sometimes reserved by her cousin with money long before puberty, and among Bedouins in the desert between the Nile and the Red Sea. Cousin marriage was practiced in Medina during Muhammad's time, but out of 113 recorded marriages in one sample, only 15 were between paternal cousins of any degree.

=== Iran ===
Cousin marriages are decreasing among Iranians. Since the Pahlavi era, fewer Iranians have practised cousin marriages. There is a strong preference for marrying a first cousin, but no specific preference for the father's brother's daughter. For the quarter of women married after age 21, it was found that the incidence of consanguinity declined to 28%. Additionally, the proportion of cousin marriage among urban families stayed constant: it was only rural families that drove the increase. For all periods, the proportion of cousin marriage among highly educated women was somewhat lower than among uneducated women. It is hypothesized that decreases in infant mortality during the period may have created a larger pool of eligible cousins to marry.

=== Iraq ===
47-60% of marriages in Iraq are consanguineous, according to a 2009 study in the journal Reproductive Health, with marriage of a man to his father's brother's daughter being preferred. The uncle of the girl – or father of the boy – assigns or reserves his niece to his son at an early age, the parents from both families arrange for the marriage usually early. This is usually done to preserve wealth in the family and is more common in rural areas. Among the Jews of Iraq, if the cousin cannot be persuaded to forgo his rights, then he is paid a sum of money by the girl's father. Among the Kurdish Hamawand tribe, the paternal male cousin must give his consent for the marriage to take place, though in the southern Kurdish regions, the cousin's right is not as strongly emphasized. Among Arabs in Iraq, the cousin right has also traditionally prevailed.

Barth finds in his study of southern Kurdistan that in tribal villages, 57% of all marriages were cousin marriages (48% bint 'amm marriages), while in a nontribal village made up of recent immigrant families, only 17% were cousin marriages (13% bint 'amm).

=== Levant ===
==== Jordan ====
28.5-63.7% of marriages in Jordan are consanguineous according to a 2009 study in the journal Reproductive Health.

==== Lebanon ====
12.8-42% of marriages in Lebanon are consanguineous according to a 2009 study in the journal Reproductive Health. A 1983-84 study of cousin marriage among 2,752 households in the capital, Beirut, found a 7.9% rate of marriage between first cousins among Christians, and a 17.3% rate among Muslims.

In Lebanon, first-cousin marriage rates differ among religious affiliations, as it is found to be 17% for Christians and 30% for Muslims throughout the past century; however, first-cousin marriage is declining among all marriages in Lebanon.

==== Syria ====
30-40% of marriages in Syria are consanguineous as of 2009.

In Syria, the right belongs to the paternal male cousin alone and the maternal male cousin has no special rights. The custom is, however, less frequent in big cities such as Damascus and Aleppo. Patai reports that in the decades preceding 1962, the right was often ignored among the Syrian urban middle class. Among the upper classes it appeared to be again more common, as certain leading families protected their wealth and status by reserving daughters for their cousins, though sons had more freedom of choice. This situation was also loosening at the time of Patai's work. This also holds among the Syrian Turks and Kurds. But the Syrian Circassians hold cousin marriage absolutely forbidden, similar to the Circassians of the Caucasus.

In her discussion of the city of Aleppo during the Ottoman Empire, Meriwether finds a rate of cousin marriage among the elite of 24%. Father's brother's daughter was most common but still only represented 38% of all cousin marriages, while 62% were with first or second cousins. But most families had either no cousin marriages or only one, while for a few the rate was as high as 70%. Cousin marriage rates were higher among women, merchant families, and older, well-established families. Meriwether cites one case of cousin marriage increasing in a prominent family as it consolidated its position and forging new alliances became less critical. Marriage patterns among the elite were, however, always diverse and cousin marriage was only one option of many. Rates were probably lower among the general population.

==== Palestinian Citizens of Israel ====
A 1984 study of consanguineous (primarily first cousin) marriages among the Arab population in rural Western Galilee found it occurred among 49% of Druze, 40% Muslims, and 29% of Christians. A 1990–92 study of all of Israel found similar results: 47% among Druze, 42% among Palestinian Muslims, and 22% among Palestinian Christians.

==== Palestine ====
In the Palestinian village of Artas in the 1920s, 13.3% of marriages, were paternal male cousin marriages; 26.1%, were cousin marriages.

=== Turkey ===
In Turkey the rate of consanguineous marriages based on previous studies is around 1 in 5 marriages, where most cases of consanguineous marriage are found commonly in rural Turkey and Eastern Anatolia regions of Turkey where the population is mainly Kurdish.

=== Outside the Middle East ===
Consanguineous marriages are also notably high in some countries or regions outside of the Middle East.

==== Caucasus ====
In the Southern Caucasus, cousin marriages usually happen among Azeris and ethnically related minorities such as Tats, Talysh and Mountain Jews, whereas among the neighboring Armenians and Georgians, It is considered a social taboo to marry up to seventh generation cousin, however, the practice is common among the Yazidi communities living in these countries. The Azerbaijani Parliament passed amendments to the Family Code in June 2025, prohibiting consanguineous marriages. Under the new changes, which will come into effect in July 2025, individuals with common grandparents will be barred from marrying.

In the Northern Caucasus, cousin marriages only happen among the ethnicities of Dagestan, while the ethnicities of the rest of the neighboring North Caucasian republics hold similar taboo to these of their counterparts in Armenia and Georgia.

==== Sub-Saharan Africa ====
In the Malian town of Timbuctoo, a field investigator found that among the Arabs, one-third of marriages are with first cousins. Half of these are with the father's brother's daughter and slightly fewer with the mother's brother's daughter. It is possible that the high MBD marriage rate is the result of Songhai influence, one group of which prefers the MBD type and shuns the FBD type, and another group of which has a preference for both. The third ethnic group of Timbuctoo is the Bela, who are Tuareg slaves, and among whom marriage between cross cousins is preferred in principle, though in practice, FBD marriage also occurs.

According to a 2009 study, the percentage of consanguineous marriages in Sudan is between 44.2 and 63.3%. Cousin marriage is common among the Kababish tribe of Sudan.

==== North Africa ====
5-10% of all marriages in Algeria are consanguineous according to a 2009 study in Reproductive Health. In the oasis-village of Sidi Khaled, some 170 miles south of Algiers, among the Mzabites further south, among the Chaamba, and among the Moors of the extreme western Sahara, cousin marriage is preferred.

A 2009 study put the percentage of consanguineous marriages in Libya at 48.4%. In Mauritania the study found the rate to be 47.2%; and Morocco at 20–28%.

==== Central and South Asia ====
The prevalence of cousin marriages is estimated to be 46.2% in Afghanistan. Regional differences exist in the rate; the Kabul province has a rate of 38.2% while Bamayan is higher at 51.2%. First cousin marriages (27.8%) were the most common type of consanguineous marriages, followed by double first cousin (6.9%), second cousin (5.8%), beyond second cousin (3.9%) and first cousin once removed (1.8%). The pattern of inheritance of genetic abnormalities in Afghanistan has a significant impact on prevalence. Autosomal recessive genetic abnormalities were observed in most and, 75.4% of the total reported cases, followed by autosomal dominant 19.7%. The main reason behind the high percentage of autosomal recessive conditions is the union between groups of people known to share genetic traits inherited from one or more common ancestors. Hereditary disorder might be one of the fundamental causes of the high death rate in Afghanistan. Based on this study, infants under the age of 2 years are mostly experiencing metabolic disorders and their frequency is up to 38.9%, followed by children in the age group 3–11 years (22.2%). Adolescents have comparatively less percentage (12.5%), but with diverse genetic anomalies, and adults have a high percentage (25.0%) of various genetic disorders, while older people (1.4%) are only affected by neurological disorders.

In Pakistan, cousin marriage is legal and common for economic, religious and cultural reasons. Consanguineous marriage in Pakistan was reported to be higher than 60% of the population in 2014. In some areas, higher proportion of first-cousin marriages in Pakistan has been noted to be the cause of an increased rate of blood disorders in the population. According to a 2005 BBC report on Pakistani marriage in the United Kingdom, 55% of British Pakistanis marry a first cousin. The BMJ reports in 2024 that young Pakistanis are moving away from cousin marriage due to an increasing awareness of genetic diseases, with the rate decreasing from 67.9% in 2006-07 to 63.6% in 2018. More educated and financially independent men and women show sharper decreases.

In India, consanguineous marriage is seen mostly among first-cousins, and mostly practiced in the southern states of Andhra Pradesh, Telangana, Tamil Nadu, and Karnataka, except Kerala. The overall prevalence of consanguineous marriage was 9.9%; the South region (23%) and North-East region (3.1%) showed the highest and lowest prevalence, respectively. Muslims had a higher prevalence (15%) than Hindus (9%). The prevalence of first cousin marriage (8.7%) was more than that of second cousin (0.7%) and of uncle-niece marriages (0.6%).

== Social aspects ==
=== Familial responsibility and honor ===
Of particular significance in the Middle East is marriage to a father's brother's daughter. Many Middle Eastern peoples express a preference for this form of marriage. Ladislav Holý explains that it is not an independent phenomenon but merely one expression of a wider preference for agnatic solidarity, or solidarity with one's father's lineage. Due to placing emphasis on the male line, the daughter of the father's brother is seen as the closest marriageable relation. According to Holý, the oft-quoted reason for cousin marriage of keeping property in the family is, in the Middle Eastern case, just one specific manifestation of keeping intact a family's whole "symbolic capital". Along with an aversion to hypogamy that prevents the loss of a man's loyalties to the higher-ranking relatives of his wife, FBD marriage more closely binds the agnatic group by ensuring that wives are agnatic as well as affinal relatives. In fact, cousin marriage in general can be seen as trading off one socially valuable outcome, namely, marital alliances with outsiders and the resulting integration of society, with the alternative outcome of greater group solidarity. But for demographic reasons, the ideal of in-marriage can never be fully realized and hence societies allowing it can always draw on the advantageous aspects of both in- and out-marriage.

The notion of honor is another social characteristic Holý identifies as being related to Middle Eastern cousin marriage. The honor of the males surrounding a woman is sullied in many societies when she misbehaves or when she is attacked. In societies like Europe that place greater value on affinal relations, responsibility for a married woman rests with both her husband's family and her own. In the Middle East, the situation is different in that primary responsibility continues to rest with the woman's own family even after she is married. Her agnates therefore, cannot release her from control upon marriage due to the risk to their honor. They and not the husband may be responsible for killing her, or sometimes her lover, if she commits adultery. Similar rules may apply in case of the payment if she is killed and for the inheritance of her property if she has no male heirs. Her natal family may continue supporting her even against her husband. This is an idealized system: some Middle Eastern societies do mix it with other systems that assign more responsibility to the husband's family.

=== Berti people in Sudan ===
Holý's field experience among the Berti people of Sudan allowed him to undertake an extensive study of cousin marriage in their culture. Holý believed that many of his findings from field experience among the Berti people of Sudan could generalize to other Middle Eastern groups. He noted that stated reasons for cousin marriage could be both pragmatic and symbolic. Stated pragmatic reasons for cousin marriage might be stated in terms of advantages for the husband such as warmer relations with his father-in-law, quicker entertainment of the husband's family by the wife in the case of a visit due to them being her relations, greater loyalty and devotion of the wife, and the ease of regaining a wife after a serious quarrel where she has withdrawn to the house of her own family. Stated pragmatic reasons for the parents included gaining access to the labor of a daughter's children by marrying her to a kinsman and thereby keeping her family close by, increased attentiveness on the part of a wife to her aging in-laws if she is related to them, and the ease of marital negotiations if the parents are brothers, or in the next best case, if the mother of one child is the sister of the father of the other child.

Holý states that, despite all this, creating a general theory of the existence of a preference for FBD marriage in terms of pragmatic reasons is not possible. Instead, any realistic theory must take into account the symbolic reasons that both are created by and help to create Berti culture. Frequently, such reasons protected the symbolic but vitally important honor of the stakeholders involved. One reason was that in Berti (and Middle Eastern) culture, one's honor is affected if a cousin becomes pregnant out of wedlock. The responsibility to see her married is directly proportional to the responsibility for her chastity and one's genealogical distance from her. One can eliminate this directly by becoming her husband. Another reason is the relationship between cousin marriage and agnatic solidarity. Holý argues from the case of the Palestinians that FBD marriage should not be viewed as simply "adding" affinal ties to previous agnatic ones. Instead, they recognize the strength of the existing ties. Distant agnates can increase their bond and become close agnates via intermarriage.

=== Discouragement ===
Advice on cousin marriage in the Middle East has not always been positive, however. Al-Maydani makes the following exhortation: "Marry the distant, but not the near." The reason given for the inadvisability of cousin marriages is most frequently the belief that the offspring of such marriages will be feeble. An early Arab author, Ibn 'Abd Rabbihi, states in his work Kitab al-'iqd al-farid of a hero that "He is a hero not borne by the cousin (of his father), he is not weakly; for the seed of relations brings forth feeble fruit." Abu Hamid al-Ghazali (1059–1111) in his principal ethical work, the Ihya 'ulum al-din, gives a different reason that "the woman should not be a near relative of the husband, because near relationship diminishes the sensuous desire." Finally, the ancient Arabic poet 'Amr b. Kulthum states, "Do not marry in your own family, for domestic enmity arises therefrom." Similar sentiments are expressed by certain Moroccan and Syrian proverbs.

Patai summarizes the Middle Eastern situation by saying that a preference for paternal male cousin marriage exists in many Middle Eastern ethnic groups, but that right to the bint 'amm exists in only some of these. The cousin right is the "complete" form of the institution of cousin marriage and preference; without the right, it is the "incomplete" form. Patai explains the differences between cultures exhibiting these two forms in terms of the geographic centrality to Middle Eastern culture, with groups on the outskirts of the Middle East likely to fall into the "incomplete" category, in terms of the cultural marginality of the group, with groups adhering tightly to older traditions more resistant to the "complete" form, in terms of modernization and Westernization, with this tending to discourage cousin marriage. The Copts of Egypt who choose to marry a cousin are considered not ideal among Copts due to cultural traditions, although not common among Copts in comparison to other ethnic groups and those of different beliefs.

=== Bride prices ===
Cousin marriage normally results in a reduced mahr in Islam. Patai states that the bride price to a cousin is usually about half as high as to a nonrelative. Due to the poverty of many families, this outlay often requires exceptional effort, and especially because the decision traditionally is in the hands of the groom's father, these considerations may weigh heavily on the outcome. The bride's family, moreover, is expected to spend much of the bride price on the bride herself, so there is a reduced incentive to gain a higher price by avoiding cousin marriage.

== Biological impact ==
Marrying a close relative significantly increases the chance that both parents carry recessive genes, which can carry defects and diseases. While babies of Pakistani heritage accounted for roughly 3.4% of all births in the UK in 2005, "they had 30% of all British children with recessive disorders and a higher rate of infant mortality," according to research done by the BBC. In 2017-2019, people of Pakistani ethnicity in England and Wales had an infant mortality rate of 6.7 per thousand live births, of which 3.4 deaths per thousand live births were attributable to congenital anomalies. This has been linked to the higher rate of consanguineous relationships among UK Pakistanis compared to the White British population. For comparison, infant mortality among the White British population over the same timeframe was 3.1 per thousand live births, of which 0.9 deaths per thousand live births were attributable to congenital anomalies. Similarly, in Oman, where cousin marriage rates were 52% in 2012, 7% of babies are born with a recessive condition, which is more than twice the global average.

== See also ==
- Coefficient of relationship
- Consanguinity
- Cousin marriage
- Endogamy
- Exogamy
- Genetic distance
- Genetic diversity
- Genetic sexual attraction
- Inbreeding
- Inbreeding avoidance
- Inbreeding depression
- Incest
- Incest taboo
- Legality of incest
- Mahram
- Muslim Reform Movement
- Polygyny in Islam
- Prohibited degree of kinship
- Proximity of blood
- Sexual taboo in the Middle East
- Watta satta
