= 2020 Egyptian protests =

Protests against the Government of Egypt

- Part of 2018–2022 Arab protests
- Date: 20 September 2020
- Location: Egypt
- Caused by: Unemployment; Corruption; Government mishandling of the COVID-19 pandemic
- Goals: Resignation of President Abdel Fattah al-Sisi; Fresh general elections
- Methods: Riots, Demonstrations
- Result: Protests suppressed by force

Parties
| Protesters and dissidents of the government; Opposition parties; Mohamed Ali | (Egypt) Egyptian Government; Egyptian armed forces; Egyptian National Police; Riot police; Pro-government demonstrators and dissidents |

Lead figures
| (no centralized leadership) | Abdel Fattah al-Sisi: Police units; Armed forces and Military forces |

Deaths and injuries
- Deaths: 2
- Injuries: unknown
- Arrested: 571-735

The 2020 Egyptian protests were a series of decentralized street protests in Egypt that started on September 20, the anniversary of the 2019 Egyptian protests, and were aimed at the resignation of Egyptian president Abdel Fattah el-Sisi. Protesters turned to the streets in several cities in Egypt, including Cairo, Giza, Suez, Kafr El Dawwar, Alexandria, Aswan, El Qanater El Khayreya, Faiyum, Minya, Luxor, and Damietta. September 25th, the sixth day of the protests, was called "Friday of Rage" (Arabic: جُمْعة الغَضَب, ALA-LC: jumʿa al-ghaḍab).

== Background ==
Abdel Fattah el-Sisi's administration began after the 2013 uprisings when former Egyptian president Mohamed Morsi was overthrown. Egyptians had accused Morsi of not realizing the promises he made to them in the elections that made him president after the uprising of 2011. They furthermore accused Morsi of steering political power to the Islamist Muslim Brotherhood. Sisi, who was an army chief general at the time, had ordered for Morsi to be arrested. Morsi went to trial with several members of the Muslim Brotherhood and was eventually imprisoned for 20 years, he died in 2019.

Because of Sisi's important role in the arrest and resignation of Morsi, people considered him a saviour from Islamist and Muslim Brotherhood rule. In the elections of 2014, Sisi won with 96% of the votes. But Sisi's popularity decreased as the years went by, especially after the austerity measures taken in 2016 and after Sisi had granted sovereignty of the Red Sea islands of Tiran and Sanafir to Saudi Arabia. In the 2018 elections, Sisi was again elected president with 97% of the votes. Despite the anti-protest law that he implemented after the events of 2013, people turned to protest in 2016, again in 2019, and eventually in 2020, against his regime.

On 20 September, 2019, construction contractor and actor Mohamed Ali had called for people to protest against president Sisi through a video that he posted online. Ali had posted other videos online accusing the Egyptian president and the military of corruption. These videos gained much attention. An anonymous source told Africa Research Bulletin that around 3000 Egyptians turned to the streets on this first day of protests. Nael Shama, an Egyptian political analyst, stated how the demonstrations escalated quickly, which could be seen in the chants they shouted: in protests in 2011, protesters' main slogan was "Bread, freedom, and social justice", but during the protests in 2019, people chanted that they wanted president Sisi to resign. Two slogans used according to Al Jazeera were "Rise up, fear not, Sisi must go" and "The people demand the regime's fall". The protests were also different from 2011 because the young people that attended the 2020 protests had not experienced the events of the 2011 uprising in the way they are experiencing Egyptian life now. Therefore, their ideas, demands, and ideas of the future are different. Sisi supporters turned to the streets as a counter-force, and, as videos of the demonstrations had circulated the internet, they responded online by using pro-Sisi hashtags. According to Africa Research Bulletin, the government responded to the protests with fire weapons, teargas, and arrests. They furthermore blocked Tahrir Square, the square in Cairo where the 2011 protests had also taken place. Amnesty International adds that besides arresting many, the Egyptian government also blocked the BBC and Alhurra news websites to try to stop the protests from spreading. The Egyptian security forces detained a total of 4300 people in relation to the 2019 protests, 111 of which were minors.

=== Causes of the 2020 protests ===
The motivation behind the 2020 protests are similar to that of the 2019 protests. Many Egyptians had been discontent towards the government because of police brutality and the economic issues the country had been facing as a result of the 2016 austerity measures; in 2020, almost 70% of the Egyptian population lived under the poverty line. People's dissatisfaction about Egyptian economics was strengthened in 2020 by the worsening economic situation as a result of the COVID-19 pandemic. Additionally, people had become frustrated when a government campaign issued fines and demolitions on unlicensed housing, or illegal construction, as Sisi called it. People were often not able to pay the fines and were disgruntled as unlicensed housing had not been a problem before.

== Timeline ==
=== The start of the protests ===
On August 29, after Sisi had issued a referendum asking people if they wanted him to remain president or not, a Twitter campaign was launched issuing discontent about Sisi's administration with the hashtag "we don't want you" (Arabic: #مِش_عايْزينَك, ALA-LC: mish ʿāyzīnak). During this campaign the first calls for a revolution on September 20, being the anniversary of the preceding year's protests, were published online and gained much attention. After Muhamed Ali supported the campaign by posting a call to action himself, people turned to the streets on September 20. The protests were not led by any known opposition movements.

Different from the 2019 protests was that some people believed that there would be no response to Ali's calls because people were afraid of getting arrested. Others believed that Ali deliberately wanted people to get detained or killed in protests, even going so far as accusing him of working together with the government. Despite these thoughts, protests started on September 20 and several photos and videos of alleged demonstrations in 17 Egyptian governorates started circulating the internet. The videos and photos were accompanied by hashtags that became trending on Twitter, e.g. "the revolution began", "down with military rule", and "go out on 20 September" (Arabic: #اِنْزِلـ20ـسِبْتِمْبِر, ALA-LC: #inzil_20_sibtimbir).

=== The course of the protests ===
The protests started in Giza, Cairo, Suez, Kafrl El Dawwar, Alexandria, Aswan, and El Qanater El Khayreya and mostly took place in rural areas in Egypt and Upper Egypt. Because of that, they are also referred to as Galabiya Uprising. In Aswan, a presidential residence was set on fire after security forces attacked protesters. People furthermore threw stones at police vehicles. In El-Qanatar, protestors walked through small streets to try to not get attacked by security forces. In the village of Al-Kadaya (also written as Kidaya), Atfih, people had overturned a police car and set it on fire after security forces had surrounded them and asked them not to protest.

On September 22, demonstrations continued in Giza, Fayoum, Minya, Luxor, and Aswan. Protesters pushed a car in a canal in Al-Hawarta, Minya, after security forces used teargas and fired weapons at them. In several places cafes took precautions by closing their doors to protect their business, in some cases they were forced to do so by authorities.

=== Friday of Rage ===
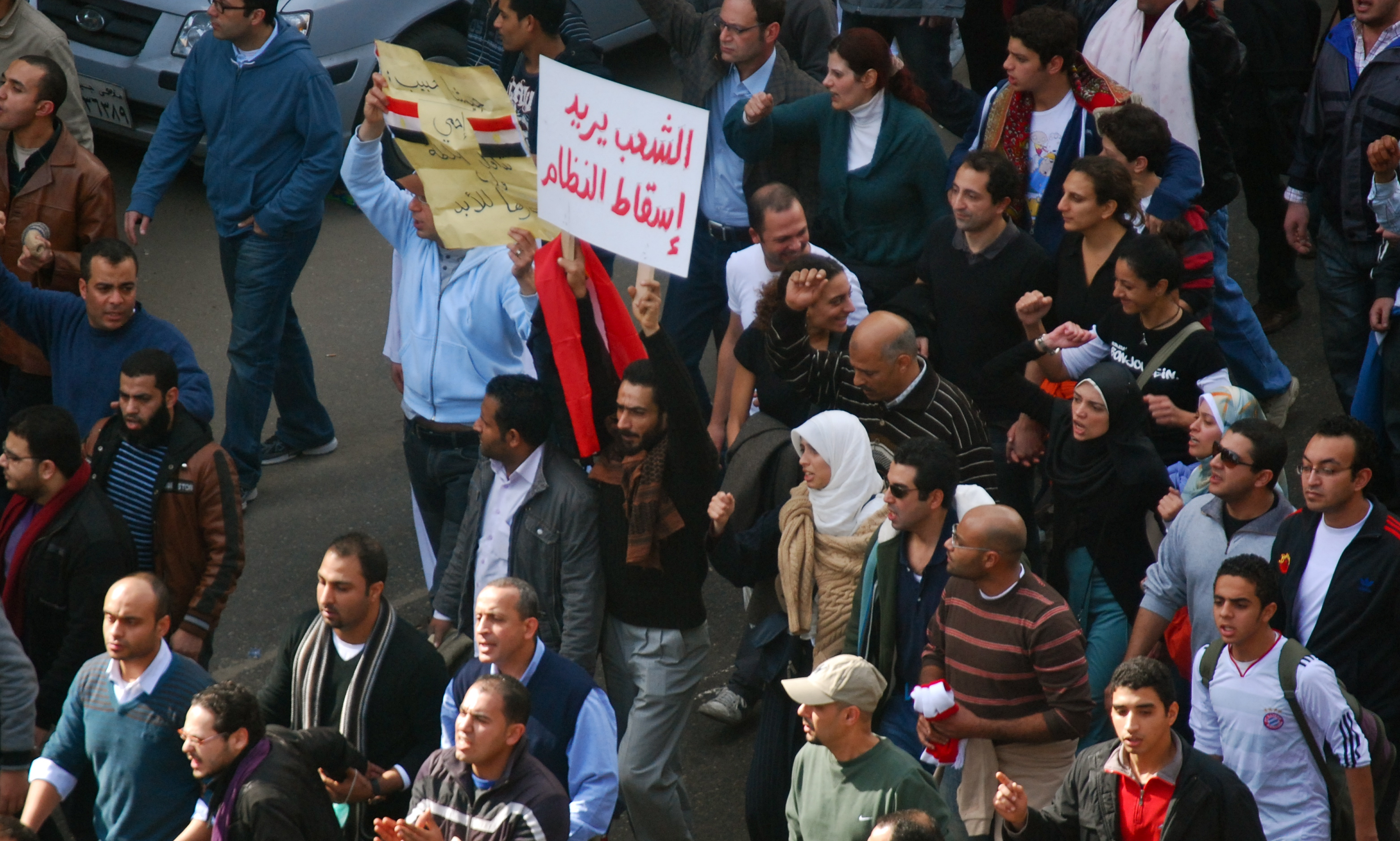
Protesters on the Day of Rage, January 28, 2011. The sign reads "الشعب يريد إسقاط النظام" which translates to "the people want the fall of the regime".

Protests continued on September 25, marking the sixth day of anti-Sisi demonstrations. People had increasingly called for protests to be taking place on Friday September 25th in the days before. Thousands of people responded to these calls by demonstrating after Friday prayer in Cairo, Giza, Damietta, and Luxor. This day is also referred to as "Friday of Rage", or "Friday of Anger".

Several video's were distributed through Twitter on which people are heard chanting "say it out loud and don't be scared, el-Sisi has got to go". Protesters furthermore burned tires as a roadblock. The police and security forces responded by charging their weapons at the crowd, trying to disperse the protesters. In a shooting in al-Blida, in the Giza governorate, three people got wounded, and one 25 year old man, Sami Wagdy Bashir, was killed when riot police tried to disperse the crowd. It is unclear how many people were arrested after the protests on Friday the 25th; the total number of arrest since the start of the protests was estimated to be around 400.

Using Friday as a day of protest and mobilization has been done in other mass protests in Egypt since the January 25 Revolution. This is often paired with a symbolic name, such as "Friday of Unity", "the Friday of the Last Chance", "Friday of Anger" on 28 January 2011, and "Friday of Rage" on 25 September 2020. Protesting on Friday as a focal day occurs in other countries in the MENA region as well.

=== September 30th ===
On September 30, Awais Al-Rawi was shot and killed by police, according to eyewitnesses. Police raided Al-Rawi's family home in an attempt to arrest a family member who had participated in protests the week before. They instead arrested Al-Rawi's younger brother to which their father objected, to which a police officer reacted by slapping Al-Rawi's father. Al-Rawi objected verbally about the treatment of his father and the argument escalated, resulting in an officer shooting him. During the funeral on the same day, mourners chanted "Sisi is the enemy of God" and "retribution by bullets", to which the police responded by firing warning shots and teargas, and arresting several people. A video of the funeral was posted on Twitter. In a response to the police's reaction, civilians kidnapped and beat an officer who was released after negotiations between tribal elders and a police official. The officer who killed Al-Rawi was suspended and would be interrogated.

=== Government responses ===
The government started taking preemptive methods since September 10th when rumors of demonstrations spread. These preemptive methods included random searches of residents and pedestrians, police checking peoples phones, and arresting over 1000 activists, political figures, intellectuals, university students, and other citizens.

When the protests occurred, security forces were deployed and military checkpoints were set up in several cities. Security was especially cautious on Fridays. in several places where protests took place, security responded to protesters with more violent measures by using birdshot (khartoush), teargas, and live bullets against protesters.

Authorities and state-run media furthermore responded to the protests by denying they were taking place. Several media channels said the videos and photos circulating the internet were Muslim Brotherhood propaganda, stating that there were no actual demonstrations taking place. The intelligence affiliated United Media Services Group, which is owned by one of the Egyptian intelligence agencies (Mukhabarat, military intelligence, National Security Agency) and owns Youm7, filmed a fake protest and distributed it to satellite channels associated with the Muslim Brotherhood to show as evidence of the Brotherhood's fabrication of demonstrations. As videos and photos of demonstrations kept circulating the internet, instead of denying the demonstrations from taking place, state-led media said they were staged and that the footage shown was Muslim Brotherhood violence. Some pro-government people, channels, or news outlets responded by stating the demonstrations were small in size. On September 25, when Friday of Rage was taking place, several pro-government news media continued stating there were not any protests taking place.

=== International responses ===
The international responses to the 2020 Egyptian protests were limited. On September 20, Amnesty International issued for detained protesters of the 2019 protests to be released. Then on September 22, the UN stated that people should "be allowed to express themselves, and for governments to listen to the people."

== Detentions, deaths, and injuries ==
Several news outlets and articles stated the numbers of detentions, deaths, and injuries that resulted when authorities intervened throughout the course of the protests. As preemptive measure, authorities arrested over 1000 people before the protests started. In the first few days, around 150 people were reported to be prosecuted, including at least 14 minors. On Friday September 25th, the Friday of Rage, three protesters were injured and one man, Sami Wagdy Bashir, was killed. After one week of protests, a total of 382 detainees were documented, of which 68 were minors. On September 30, Awais Al-Rawi was shot and killed by police, according to eyewitnesses. The police also opened fire at the people who attended Al-Rawi's funeral, which can be seen in a video posted on Twitter. On October 2 it was reported that 496 people were detained, with a total of between 571 and 735 arrests between September 10th and 29th.

== See also ==
- 2011 Egyptian revolution
- Egyptian Crisis (2011–2014)
- 2019 Egyptian protests
- 2018–2022 Arab protests
- Egyptian Armed Forces
