= Tora Prison =

Egyptian prison complex

Coordinates: 29°57′06″N 31°16′42″E

Tora Prison سجن طرة
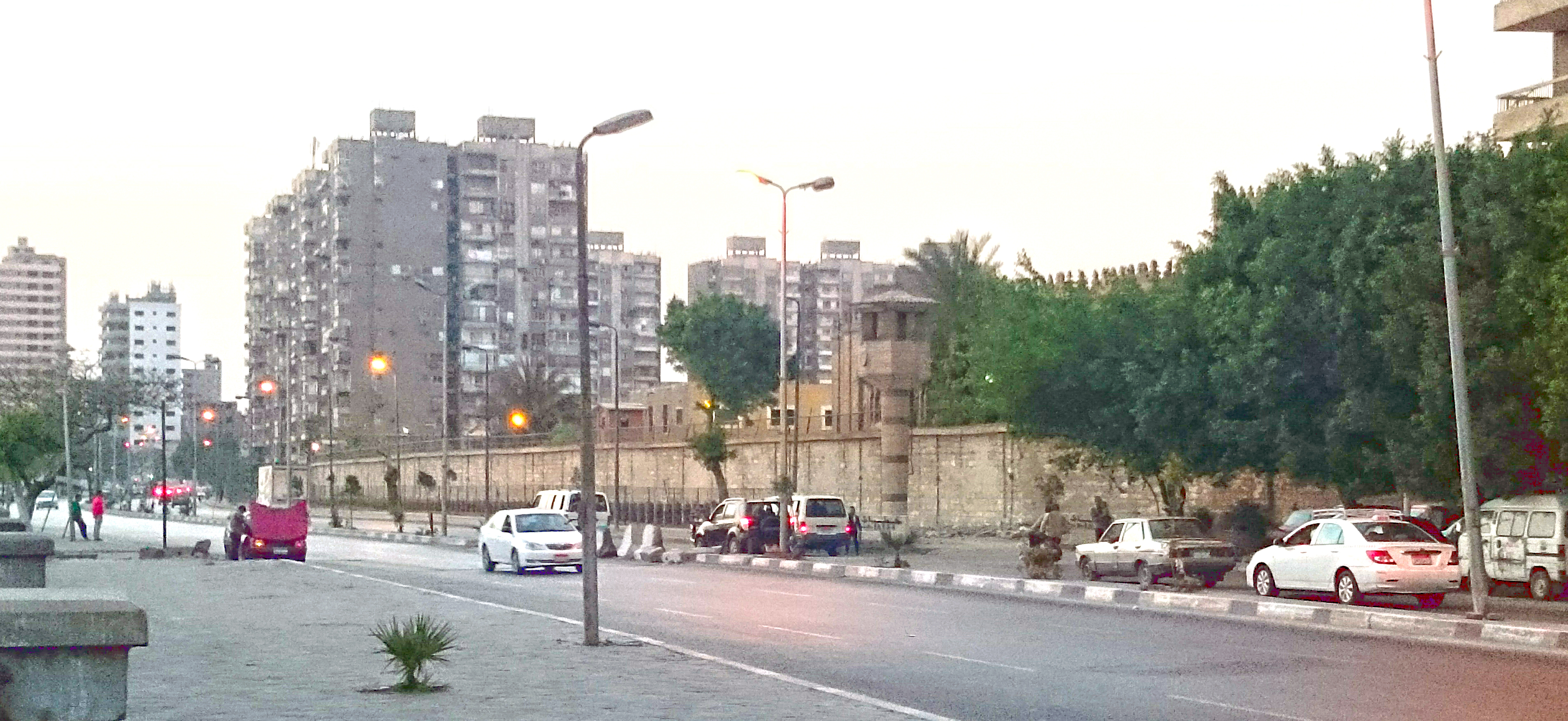
- Interactive map of Tora Prison سجن طرة
- Location: Tura, Egypt
- Status: Operational
- Security class: Supermax, Maximum Security, General, Light
- Opened: 1908
- Managed by: Ministry of Interior

Tora Prison (Egyptian Arabic: سجن طره Segn Tora; Egyptian Arabic pronunciation: [seɡn tˤurˤɑ]) is an Egyptian prison complex for criminal and political detainees, located in Tora, Egypt. The complex is situated in front of the Tora El Balad metro station. The main buildings in the Tora Prison complex are Tora Agricultural Prison, Tora Liman (maximum security), Tora Istiqbal (reception), Tora El Mahkoum and Tora Supermax prison, also known as Scorpion Prison (Arabic: سجن العقرب Segn El ʿAqrab).

== History ==
Tora Agricultural Prison was established in 1928 by Wafdist Interior Minister Mostafa El-Nahas while he was the interior minister, in an effort to ease overcrowding at Abu Zaabal Prison.

On 1 June 1957, security guards at Tora Prison killed 21 Muslim Brotherhood prisoners.

== Architecture ==
Tora prison consists of seven blocks each holding approximately 350 prisoners, and are divided into sections such as political prisoners and criminals according to the severity of their crimes. There is a block for police officers and judges imprisoned on bribery charges, and a disciplinary block consisting of seven solitary confinement cells, two meters squared in size and some without light or ventilation. The prison walls are seven metres tall and are monitored by CCTV. The different sections of the prison are walled off from each other. After three prisoners from the Egyptian Islamic Jihad organization implicated in the assassination of Anwar Sadat escaped in 1988, 2.5 meters were added to walls. Tora Prison has a small hospital overlooking a garden which is the block where businessmen and members of the Mubarak regime are held for corruption cases. The hospital is next to a football pitch and to a tennis court where the prisoners exercise. The prison has held some of Egypt's most high-profile prisoners. Some cells for long-term inmates are reminiscent of typical, if cramped, apartments (i.e. including a kitchenette, etc.).

In 2014, a maximum security wing was built to hold political prisoners, whose numbers had started increasing since the July 2013 removal of Mohamed Morsi from office.

== Torture ==
Welcome parades, a technique used in Egyptian prisons in which new prisoners are physically and psychologically abused while crawling between two lines of policemen, was used in Tora Prison in September 2019 during the 2019 Egyptian protests, when blogger Alaa Abd el-Fattah and his lawyer Mohamed el-Baqer of the Adalah Center for Rights and Freedoms were subjected to welcome parades following their 29 September arrests.

There have been allegations that the prison was used for other forms of torture and that there was Mukhabarat (Egyptian intelligence services) complicity with CIA extraordinary rendition practices during the Mubarak presidency. Tora Prison may have operated in this capacity since 1995/96 (being the most accessible of the few liman, i.e. maximum security prisons), making it one of the first of the black sites of George W. Bush's war on terror.

== Notable inmates ==
- Maajid Nawaz, an Islamist-radical turned counter-extremist from the UK. He was visited in Tora by his lawyer, the future London Mayor, Sadiq Khan.
- † Shukri Mustafa (1965–1967), executed by hanging.
- Wolfgang Lotz (The Champagne Spy) (1965–1968)
- Abd al-Hamid Kishk (1981–1982)
- Mustafa Amin
- Abbud al-Zumar (1981–2011)
- Kamal Khalil
- Muhammad Abdelrahim al-Sharqawi (3 years in the late 1980s)
- Azzam Azzam (1997–2004)
- Ahmad Ibrahim al-Sayyid al-Naggar (1999/2000 previous to his execution elsewhere)
- Muhammad al-Zawahiri (1999–?2011, tortured and beaten)
- Ashraf Shahin (early 2000s, reportedly tortured)
- Ihab Saqr (2002–2006 Istiqbal Tura, 2006–2008 Liman Tura, 2008-? Istiqbal Tura)
- Hassan Mustafa Osama Nasr (2003–?2007, reportedly tortured by electric shocks, beating and rape; see Abu Omar case)
- Ayman Nour (2005–2009)
- Hisham Talaat Moustafa (2008–present)
- Blogger Alaa Abd El-Fattah and dozens of other civil-rights activists (2006, presumably Istiqbal Tura)
  - also in 2019 together with his lawyer Mohamed el-Baqer
- Alaa Mubarak and Gamal Mubarak (2011)
- Adel al-Gazzar (2011–?)
- Safwat El-Sherif
- Khairat el-Shater
- Zakaria Azmi
- Ahmed Ezz
- Ahmed Nazif
- Ahmed El Maghrabi
- Anas el-Fiqqi
- Habib el-Adly
- Tito Momen (sentenced for 15 years because he became a Mormon, released in 2006, went on to write a book titled "My name used to be Muhammad.")
- Sayyed Imam Al-Sharif (2004–present)
- Hosni Mubarak (2011–2013) incarcerated in April 2011, sentenced for life imprisonment in June 2012, but released in August 2013 after a court found that there were no legal grounds for his continued detention.
- Tarek Loubani and John Greyson, two Canadian citizens arrested in the 2013 Egyptian protests and held for 50 days without charges
- Mahmoud Abu Zeid, an Egyptian freelance photographer arrested during the August 2013 Rabaa massacre, detained for over two years and then charged
- Mohamed Soltan, human rights activist and civilian journalist, shot during a pro-democracy protest and then arrested without a warrant in his home 10 days later in August 2013. Mohamed is still imprisoned (as of March 28, 2015) in Tora Limon maximum security prison without charge or evidence presented against him. Much of his detention has been spent in solitary confinement, likely a punishment for his international popularity and a hunger strike which he began on January 26, 2014 to protest the inhumane conditions of the prison and the torture and unjustified detention of himself and hundreds of other human rights activists and journalists
- Mustafa Ahmed Hassan Hamza (2014–present)
- † Mohamed Morsi (2013–2019), deposed President of Egypt. Died in prison of a heart attack.
- † Essam el-Erian (2013–2020) Died in prison of a heart attack.
- Essam El-Haddad (2013–present)
- Gehad El-Haddad (2013–present)
- Mohamed Fahmy (2013 - 2015)
- Husam Abu al-Bukhari (2013–present)
- Ayman Nour (2013–present)
- Khaled al-Qazzaz (2014–2015)
- Ezzat Ghoniem (2018-present), whose release has been requested by European Parliament
- † Shady Habash (2018-2020)
- Patrick Zaki (2020-2021, reportedly tortured)

Unconfirmed:

- Ahmad Salama Mabruk (1999 – early 2000s?)
- Essam Marzouk (1999–?, reportedly tortured)
- Abu Ayyub al-Masri (1999–?, based on claim of Mamdouh Ismail and conflicts other reports)
- Mamdouh Habib (2001/02, reportedly tortured by electric shocks, hanging)
- Ahmed Agiza and Muhammad al-Zery (2002−2004, reportedly tortured and beaten)
- Ibn al-Shaykh al-Libi (2002−?2006, reportedly tortured by confinement in a tiny space and beatings)
- Mustafa Sameh Hassanien (May 2020, filmmaker studying at CUNY City University of New York in the US)
