= Shukrallah =

Shukrallah, Shukralla or Shokrallah (Arabic: شكر الل) is an Arabic given name and surname. Notable people with the name include:

- Mirza Shokrollah Isfahani, 16th-century Iranian politician
- Ignatius Shukrallah II (c. 1674–1745), Syriac Orthodox patriarch of Antioch
- Baselius Shukrallah (c. 1748–1760), Syriac Orthodox Maphrian of the East
- Nawaf Shukralla (born 1976), Bahraini football referee
- Hala Shukrallah (born 1954), Egyptian politician
- Hani Shukrallah (1950–2019), Egyptian journalist and political analyst
