= Welcome parade (torture) =

Form of torture

The welcome parade (also known as health trail or corredor polonês) is a form of torture used to new prisoners in some countries, including Poland in the twentieth century during the Polish People's Republic (communist period), and Egypt and Belarus in the twenty-first century. It is the frame-up for a gauntlet running, a form of corporal punishment.

== Belarus ==
In Belarus, the welcome parade is widely used in prisons. Footage of the parade that took place on 11 August 2020 during the 2020–2021 Belarusian protests in Okrestina prison in Minsk is available on YouTube.

== Brazil ==
In Brazil, the welcome parade was called corredor polonês (Polish corridor) in allusion to the Polish tradition.

== Egypt ==
During the late twentieth and early twenty-first centuries, torture is common in Egyptian police stations, with 701 incidents of torture recorded by the Egyptian Organization for Human Rights between 1985 and 2011, among which 204 prisoners died from torture and mistreatment.

According to Abd El-Fattah, the welcome parade is used against prisoners classified with a low status, "without protection." He reported an incident in which a prisoner of high social status was accidentally subjected to a welcome parade. The incident was followed by "frantic action" by senior officials, who apologised to the prisoner.

Abd El-Fattah reported a welcome parade used against an elderly man who died during the parade. According to him, there was no change in prison procedures following the death.

=== Method ===
In the Egyptian variant, policemen form two rows. The new prisoner crawls on the ground or is made to walk bent over between the two rows of policemen. The policemen then kick, hit and insult the new prisoner walking between the two rows.

After Egyptian blogger, software developer and political activist Alaa Abd el-Fattah was arrested on 29 September 2019 during the 2019 Egyptian protests, he was blindfolded and had to undress down to his underwear for his welcome parade. He was beaten on his back and his neck, repeatedly kicked, threatened and verbally abused during the parade, which lasted 15 minutes. Abd El-Fattah's welcome parade took place in Tora Prison.

Mohamed el-Baqer, Abd El-Fattah's lawyer and head of the Adalah Center for Rights and Freedoms (himself also arrested on 29 September 2019), was blindfolded for his welcome parade in Tora Prison, during which he was insulted by policemen.

== Poland ==
In Poland under the communist regime (1946–1989), the welcome parade torture was called the "health trail" (Polish: ścieżka zdrowia) and was widely applied by police (Milicja Obywatelska), riot police (ZOMO) and internal security forces/political police (Służba Bezpieczeństwa), particularly against political protesters and anticommunist activists.
