= Istiqlal Party (disambiguation) =

The Istiqlal Party is a political party in Morocco.

Istiqlal Party (Independence Party) may also refer to:

- Independence Party (Egypt)
- Independence Party (Mandatory Palestine)
- Iraqi Independence Party
