= 2019 Egyptian protests =

Protests against the Government of Egypt

- Part of the Second Arab Spring
- Date: 20 September 2019 – December 2019
- Location: Egypt By Egyptian expatriates United States; Germany; Italy; United Kingdom; South Africa Other international protests Sudan
- Caused by: Repression; Corruption; Nepotism
- Goals: Resignation of president Abdel Fattah el-Sisi; Release of all political prisoners
- Status: Protests ended
- Result: No major change

Parties
Protestors; Independence Party; Muslim Brotherhood Socialist Popular Alliance Party: other socialist and liberal movements supported by: European protestors and demonstrators; Sudanese Professionals Association	(Egypt) El-Sisi government: Egyptian armed forces; Abdel Fattah al-Sisi; Riot police; Pro-government demonstrators and dissidents

Lead figures
Mohamed Ali Abdullah El Sharif: Mohammed Nasser Ali; Mahienour El-Massry; Abed Aziz Husseini (vice-president of the Dignity Party) Abdel Nasser Ismail (vice-president of the Socialist Popular Alliance Party)	Abdel Fattah el-Sisi; President of Egypt Moustafa Madbouly; Prime Minister of Egypt (Egypt) Ali Abdel Aal; Head of Parliament (Egypt) Mohamed Ahmed Zaki; Minister of Defence (Egypt) Mahmoud Tawfik; Minister of Interior

Casualties
- Arrested: 4300 including: lawyers Mahienour el-Massry, Mohamed el-Baqer; journalists Khaled Dawoud, Alaa Abd el-Fattah; academics Hazem Hosny, Hassan Nafaa; Sudanese student Waleed Abdelrahman Hassan (freed 2 October); 111 minors

The 2019 Egyptian protests were mass protests in Cairo, Alexandria, Damietta and other cities on 20, 21 and 27 September 2019 in which the protestors called for President Abdel Fattah el-Sisi to be removed from power. Security forces responded with tear gas, rubber bullets and, as of 23 October 2019, 4300 arbitrary arrests had been made, based on data from the Egyptian Center for Economic and Social Rights, the Egyptian Commission for Rights and Freedoms, the Arabic Network for Human Rights Information, among which 111 were minors according to Amnesty International and the Belady Foundation. Prominent arrestees included human rights lawyer Mahienour el-Massry, journalist and former leader of the Constitution Party Khaled Dawoud and two professors of political science at Cairo University, Hazem Hosny and Hassan Nafaa. The wave of arrests was the biggest in Egypt since Sisi formally became president in 2014.

Human Rights Watch called for all those arrested for peacefully expressing their opinions to be released immediately. Amnesty International described the Sisi government being "shaken to its core" by the 20–21 September protests and that the authorities had "launched a full-throttle clampdown to crush demonstrations and intimidate activists, journalists and others into silence". Two thousand people, including Sudanese Professionals Association (SPA) representatives, protested in Khartoum on 26 September in support of Waleed Abdelrahman Hassan, a Sudanese anti-Islamist student detained by Egyptian authorities, who gave a forced confession on MBC Masr television. The SPA stated, "the era when Sudanese citizens were humiliated inside or outside their country has gone and will never return". The Sudanese Foreign Ministry summoned the Egyptian ambassador and Waleed Abdelrahman Hassan was freed on 2 October 2019.

A massive police clampdown took place around Tahrir Square and across Egypt on 27 September, together with pro-Sisi rallies of government employees organised by the National Security Agency, and anti-Sisi protests on Warraq Island on the Nile, in Giza, in Helwan, in Qus, and in the Luxor, Aswan Minya and Sohag Governorates. On 3 November 2019, parliamentarian Ahmed Tantawi made online and parliamentary proposals for Sisi to step down in 2022 rather than stand for re-election in 2024.

== Background ==
Mass protests in the Egyptian revolution of 2011 led to the demission of President Hosni Mubarak, the 2012 Egyptian presidential election won by Mohamed Morsi, the 2012–2013 Egyptian protests against the Morsi presidency, the 2013 Egyptian coup d'état which overthrew Morsi, the August 2013 Rabaa massacre by the security forces and army led by general Abdel Fattah el-Sisi, and an authoritarian government under Sisi, who was elected president with no serious opponents in 2014 and 2018. Protests against the imprisonment of ordinary civilians led to mass demonstrations at the beginning of the year. The first wave of mass protests were from February–June. Strikes against electricity, bread and corn and rice prices, fuel price hike, economy, shortage of food and water and oil. It led to nothing achieved.

== Online anti-Sisi videos ==
Starting on 2 September 2019, Mohamed Ali (also: Aly), an Egyptian construction contractor living in exile in Spain, claimed on online social networks that he had worked in the construction industry for 15 years under army contracts, building five villas for colleagues of Sisi and a palace for Sisi in a military camp. Ali accused Sisi of wasting public funds and "[taking] low-level corruption to a new level". Ali's videos outline specific incidents and directly accuse well-known military individuals, including Major-Generals Kamel al-Wazir and Essam al-Kholy. Egyptian authorities ran a media campaign attacking Ali. According to Said and Mamdouh writing in Mada Masr, the governmental campaign "did not refute the substance of [Ali's] claims."

After the first week of wide circulation of Ali's videos, Sisi denied the allegations at a session of the "National Youth Conference. Sisi stated that "all the intelligence agencies told me please do not talk about it. ... I told them, what's between me and the people is trust." Within a few hours of Sisi's speech, Ali posted two hours of new videos, referring to Sisi's son Mahmoud and the Sinai insurgency.

Mosaad Abu Fagr, a Sinai activist in exile, then released two videos in which he claimed that the Egyptian authorities refused an offer by North Sinai tribal leaders to remove the terrorist cells within a few weeks, and that he was asked by the tribal leaders to publish that information. Abu Fagr stated that Sisi cooperated with drug smugglers and dealers instead of working with the tribes and that Sisi and his son Mahmoud have business interests in smuggling between the Sinai and the Gaza Strip. Abu Fagr also accused the Egyptian security forces of the "wiping out of entire villages" along the border with Gaza.

Lawyer Mohamed Hamdy Younes stated that he would request the Attorney-General to investigate Ali's accusations. He was then arrested and charged with belonging to a terrorist organisation. Former army officer and lawyer Ahmed Sarhan circulated a video supporting most of Ali's claims, calling for Younes to be released and making new accusations against people close to Sisi. Sarhan's video was viewed half a million times.

A masked man circulated a video claiming that he had sensitive information about Sisi, that Ali's videos contain "factual information about the corruption in the upper ranks of the Armed Forces" and that "the events happening" constitute "retaliation" by the Mukhabarat against Military Intelligence, which was headed by Sisi until 2012. In another video, a masked man claiming to be an intelligence officer stated that Sisi changed commanders frequently in order to avoid any becoming too powerful and that Sisi coordinated intelligence information closely with Israel. Former Air Force pilot Hany Sharaf and former state security officer Hesham Sabry then circulated videos highly critical of Sisi.

Wael Ghonim, who played a key online role in sparking the 2011 Egyptian revolution and lives in the United States, posted videos similar to the others, adding claims that Sisi's son Mahmoud played a strong role in managing Egyptian "daily politics". A representative of the Egyptian Embassy in Washington, D.C. telephoned Ghonim, asking him to stop criticising the Egyptian authorities, in exchange for which he would receive a payment and a guarantee to be able to "return to Egypt safely". Ghonim refused, and a few days later Ghonim's brother Hazem was arrested in Cairo. Ghonim interpreted this as a kidnapping in revenge for Ghonim having refused to remain silent.

Ali was described in mid-September by Mohamed Elmasry of the Doha Institute for Graduate Studies as being "probably the most popular man in Egypt" with millions of viewers of his online videos and millions of people using Ali's anti-Sisi hashtags. Elmasry described Ali as "a legitimate threat to the el-Sisi government."

On 21 September, following the previous day's protests, Ali called for a "million-man march" to fill all the "major squares" in Egypt on the following Friday, 27 September. Ali stated, "This is a people's revolution... We have to link up together as one... and organise going down to the major squares."

== Late September 2019 protests ==
=== 20 and 21 September ===
On Friday 20 September 2019, in response to Ali's call for anti-Sisi protests, two thousand people, mostly young, in Cairo, Alexandria, Damietta, Suez, Kafr El Sheikh and four other Egyptian cities on 20 September 2019 carried out street protests calling for Sisi to be removed from power.

Chants included "rise up, fear not, Sisi must go" and "the people demand the regime's fall".

Street protests continued in Cairo, Suez, Giza and El Mahalla El Kubra on 21 September. In Suez, with 200 demonstrators, teargas, rubber bullets and live bullets were shot at protestors. The tear gas spread to "a few" kilometres from the zone of the protest where a resident felt the gas making her nose feel as if it were burning.

=== 27 September ===
On 26 September, exiled former presidential candidate Ayman Nour stated that the massive scale of the arrests showed that the Sisi government was "terrified" and that he expected protests to grow, with the fear barrier having been broken down and the mass arrests provoking anger in the context of socioeconomic difficulties. On the same day, actor Amr Waked tweeted to seven million followers that "Sisi is done ... it is over for him and anyone who supports him now will be making a huge mistake."

Anti-Sisi

On 27 September itself, 1000 to 2000 people on Warraq Island on the Nile next to Cairo protested against Sisi and were attacked by police using tear gas. One of the slogans chanted by protestors was, "No matter how, we'll bring Sisi down". Using their rifles, police "beat the hell" out of six of the Warraq protestors.

A protest of 24 people took place in Helwan in the Cairo Governorate in front of the al-Istiqama mosque. Police fired shots in the air in response.

Anti-Sisi protests took place in Qus in Qena, where they were dispersed by police, in Luxor Governorate, in Aswan Governorate, in Minya Governorate, and in Sohag Governorate.

A protest of 70 people took place in Giza and was dispersed by police.

Clampdown on protests

Police organised "a huge show of force" in central Cairo and other Egyptian cities, with Tahrir Square heavily policed and four metro stations close to Tahrir Square were closed. All roads leading to Tahrir Square were blocked and checkpoints were established on 6th October Bridge, which had been a key route to Tahrir Square during the 2011 Egyptian revolution, and 15th May Bridge.

Instructions received by the Ministry of Interior had been to respond to demonstrations with limited force for "no more than a few minutes" and to use all available violent measures against street protests.

Pro-Sisi

Pro-Sisi rallies were organised on 27 September with the National Security Agency instructing health, education, youth and sports ministries and agencies and oil companies to send their employees to the rallies. State companies bussed employees to a major road east of the centre of Cairo and to Alexandria. Free meals were given to a group of families from Beni Mazar in Minya Governorate who organised 30 buses to participate in the pro-Sisi Cairo rallies. The National Security Agency warned independent Members of Parliament from talking about the "ongoing events or the discussions around Sisi".

== Arrests and harassment ==
In response to the first reports of arrests, Human Rights Watch (HRW) called for Egypt to respect the International Covenant on Civil and Political Rights to which it is legally bound, guaranteeing freedom of expression, association and peaceful assembly. HRW called for the Egyptian security services to follow the United Nations Basic Principles on the Use of Force and Firearms by Law Enforcement Officials by using "non-violent means before resorting to the use of force and firearms".

Arrests for the 20 and 21 September protests were estimated as 500 by the Egyptian Center for Economic and Social Rights (ECESR) that published a list of the names of arrestees. Arrests were earlier reported by the Egyptian Commission for Rights and Freedoms (ECRF) for 12 towns including Cairo, Giza, Alexandria, Suez and towns in Dakahlia Governorate, Qalyubia Governorate and Kafr el-Sheikh. ECRF stated that it had created an "emergency room" to provide support in relation to the sudden surge in arrests.

Human rights lawyer Mahienour el-Massry was arrested by three plainclothes officers in front of the Supreme State Security Prosecution headquarters in Cairo while telephoning to a friend Noha Kamal on 22 September. She screamed to Kamal, "They're arresting me. I am being taken away" and was taken away in a microbus.

HRW called on the Egyptian security forces to "immediately release all those arrested for solely exercising their rights".

On 23 September, Mohamed Ali, whose videos sparked off the online discussion and street protests, stated that "officers" had been following him in Spain for two weeks, and that he had been "hiding and running away from them". Ali stated that the officers wished to kill him and that he was too tired to "run any more". Ali stated that Spanish authorities were responsible for his safety and that if he were "killed in Spain," then that would "[prove] that Europe is a liar just like the United States and is willing to give up anybody."

By 25 September, the arrest count was estimated at 1100 by the Arabic Network for Human Rights Information (ANHRI), ECESR and ECRF and 1400 by Middle East Eye. In addition to el-Massry, prominent arrestees included former leader of the Constitution Party Khaled Dawoud and two professors of political science at Cairo University, Hazem Hosny and Hassan Nafaa. Dawoud, Hosny and Nafaa were charged with "spreading fake news and joining terrorist organisations".

Hazem Hosny was arrested without a warrant and held incommunicado. His legal defence team called for him to be released immediately. Hosny had earlier described Mohamed Ali as playing a "positive role" and described the new protest movement as having the potential to affect the "international formula that largely determines Sisi's continued rule". Hosny argued in favour of "[stripping] Sisi of his dictatorial control of the Egyptian state".

Prior to his arrest, Hassan Nafaa had argued that "the continuation of Sisi's absolute rule [would] lead to disaster" and that "public pressure from the street" was needed to end Sisi's presidency. Nafaa stated that "the image Sisi has created for himself has been totally shaken and it has been replaced by the opposite image."

Khaled Dawoud, arrested on 25 September 2019, as former media spokesperson of the National Salvation Front, had supported the 2013 Egyptian coup d'état but later criticised Sisi. Following Mohamed Ali's video releases, Dawoud called for investigations of the corruption claims.

The arrest count mounted to 1909 on 26 September, with the arrest of lawyers Mohamed Salah Agag, deputy head of the Lawyers' Syndicate; Ahmed Sarhan; Ahmed Abdel Azeem; Islam Khairy Nour Eddin and Mahmoud Moemen Naeem. Two Turks, two Jordanians, a Palestinian and a Dutchman were arrested and charged with "spreading violence against the state and publishing false news."

The arrests of five journalists, including Sayed Abdellah, who had been reporting on the protests in Suez, and Mohammed Ibrahim, author of the blog "Oxygen Egypt", were documented by Amnesty International. Labour leader Rashad Mohammed Kamal, who participated in the protests, was arrested at his home in Suez. Politicians, including Abed Aziz Husseini, vice-president of the Dignity Party (Karama) and Abdel Nasser Ismail, vice-president of the Socialist Popular Alliance Party were arrested.

On 29 September, the Egyptian blogger, software developer and activist Alaa Abd el-Fattah, who had previously been arrested for his political activism during the Mubarak, Morsi and Sisi presidencies, and had not participated in the 2019 Egyptian protests, was arrested by State Security Prosecution on unknown charges. El-Fattah's lawyer Mohamed al-Baqer, director of the human rights organisation Adalah Center for Rights and Freedoms, was himself arrested at the prosecutor's office on 29 September. Both were tortured in welcome parades in Tora Prison.

Arrested politicians included 11 members of the Independence Party that had called for citizens to participate in the street protests as proposed by Mohamed Ali.

On 2 October, ECESR listed 2285 detainees grouped into six separate legal cases, among which almost all (2268) are in Case 1338/2019. Alaa Abd el-Fattah and his lawyer Mohamed el-Baqer were detained under Case 1356/2019 or 1365/2019. On 6 October, ECRF listed about 3000 detainees, larger than any earlier arrest waves of the Sisi presidency. Three quarters had appeared in front of a prosecutor; 57 had been released without being charged; 100 people were listed as missing.

Of those arrested for protesting, many prisoners appear to not have participated in this most recent wave of action. There are multiple cases of people claiming that their family members have never publicly protested, in 2011 or 2019, but were still arrested. Several human rights lawyers and advocates described the arrests as indiscriminate and arbitrary. Amnesty International stated that at least 111 children were arrested as well, often after having their phones searched at checkpoints.

According to The New York Times, the arrested protestors were held in poor conditions. Due to the overflow in local prisons, some detainees have gone without food, water, or access to toilets. Most have not been allowed to contact their families. For this reason, families of those imprisoned rarely knew where their family members were being held. Some of the detained were placed in the bases of the Central Security Forces, a paramilitary group whose buildings are not made to hold citizen prisoners.

=== Internet censorship ===
In the week following the 20/21 September protests, Egyptian authorities blocked, restricted or temporarily disrupted online communication services including BBC News, WhatsApp, Signal.

=== Egyptian political party freeze threat ===
The Civil Democratic Movement, including the Socialist Popular Alliance Party, stated that it did not participate in the protests but did have a vision for political reforms. It objected to the mass arrests of protestors, lawyers, journalists and politicians, and stated that it was considering a freeze on public political activities in response to the crackdown.

== Further calls for political change ==
=== November parliamentary protest ===
On 3 November 2019, elected member of the House of Representatives Ahmed Tantawi made parliamentary and online social network protests calling for el-Sisi to step down in 2022, rather than in 2024 as defined in the 2019 constitutional amendment. Tantawi later discussed his video with Mada Masr, stating that his aim was to protect Egypt from the "imminent danger" of el-Sisi continuing in power too long, that it was consistent with el-Sisi's promises, and that this should satisfy el-Sisi's supporters. Tantawi submitted his formal request under parliamentary procedure to Ali Abdel Aal, Speaker of the House of Representatives, proposing that 12 parliamentary committees be created to "generate a national dialogue about the political, economic and social problems facing the country," to solve "the real crisis Egypt is living through, which authorities should pay attention to before it is too late" and that the proposal would help to "absorb public outrage". Tantawi expressed his worry that a violent reaction by authorities to his initiative would discourage "the people" from choosing political methods of change.

Member of parliament Mahmoud Badr called Tantawi's proposal an "outright violation of the constitution" and 95 members of parliament submitted a request to the Speaker, Abdel Aal, to refer Tantawi to the parliament's Ethics Committee, on the grounds that Tantawi's initiative "undermines the Egyptian state and its institutions".

=== December 2019 broad consensus ===
On 28 December 2019, Mohamed Ali, who had sparked off the September street protests, released the "Egyptian Consensus Document" with a list of four key principles and four key actions for replacing the existing system of government. Ali claimed that the document represented the consensus of a wide range of the Egyptian opposition.

The following day, the Egyptian National Action Group (ENAG), including Ayman Nour as spokesperson, was launched. ENAG made a similar claim of representing the consensus of a broad array of the Egyptian opposition ("centrists, liberals, leftists [and] Islamists") with a consensus program for replacing the governmental system.

=== September 2020 anniversary ===
Protests restarted on the 2020 anniversary of the 2019 protests. The protests were decentralised and started on 20 September 2020, again calling for el-Sisi to resign. Protest locations included Cairo, Giza, Suez, Kafr El Dawwar, Alexandria, Aswan, El Qanater El Khayreya, Faiyum, Minya and Luxor. The sixth day of protests, on 25 September, was called a "Day of Rage".

== Sociopolitical analysis ==
Dalia Fahmy of Long Island University said that the 20 September 2019 protests showed people "[breaking] the fear barrier", which she said was surprising but expected because of demographic change. She stated, "When you have much of the population that doesn't live with the post-revolution trauma or memories, you have a group of young people coming in with a different set of demands and different kinds of understanding of a future possibility. So those on the streets today are very different from the ones that were there eight years ago."

=== Muslim Brotherhood role ===
According to American University in Cairo political science professor Mustafa Kamel al-Sayyed, the Muslim Brotherhood supported and amplified Mohamed Ali's criticisms against Sisi and Ali's calls for protests. Al-Sayyed stated, "the Brotherhood certainly benefited from his videos and their channels exploited what he was saying to portray a negative image of Sisi's leadership." He expected that the Muslim Brotherhood as an "idea based on Islam [would] continue to attract many."

Former member of parliament and member of the al-Ahram Center for Political and Strategic Studies, Amr el-Shobaki, judged the Brotherhood's role to be weak, stating that the Brotherhood does not "have the capacity to call for a rally [and its] capacity to recruit new members has been weakened." He said that the 20 September protests were by "everyday youth, those economically marginalised" and that "the Brotherhood wasn't behind or even participated" in the protests.

== Reactions ==
Writing in The Independent on 6 October 2019, Bel Trew criticised the lack of reactions of Western powers to the wave of arrests, stating "no major western ally of Egypt has breathed a word."

=== Egypt ===
The Revolutionary Socialists stated that the protests "restored hope to the millions who were desperate". The Social Democratic Party, a supporter of the 2013 coup by Sisi, objected to the 2019 crackdown, stating that citizens had the right to "exercise their constitutional and legal right to peaceful demonstration".

=== International civil society protests ===
Demonstrations by expatriate Egyptians in support of the 21 September and 22 September protests took place in the United States, Germany, Italy, the United Kingdom and South Africa.

Sudan

On 26 September, two thousand people protested in support of Waleed Abdelrahman Hassan (or Walid, Abdulrahman), a Sudanese student arrested in Cairo for alleged participation in the 21 September protest. The protest took place in Khartoum in front of the Foreign Affairs Ministry and the Egyptian embassy. The Sudanese Professionals Association (SPA) called for Abdelrahman Hassan to be able to contact his family, choose a lawyer and not be tortured or coerced. Abdelrahman Hassan's friends and relatives stated that an apparent confession by him broadcast by MBC Masr on 26 September, in which he stated support for the Muslim Brotherhood in Egypt, was a forced confession, given Abdelrahman Hassan's long-term opposition to Islamists in Sudan under the Omar al-Bashir government, for which he was arrested in 2013 and 2018, and during the Sudanese Revolution. Abdelrahman Hassan's friend Mohammed Saleh described the idea of Hassan supporting the Egyptian Muslim Brotherhood as "unbelievable". The SPA stated that the video broadcast was "shameful" and that, "We stress here that the era when Sudanese citizens were humiliated inside or outside their country has gone and will never return." Another protest in front of the Egyptian embassy in Khartoum was held on 27 September, with protest banners stating that Abdelrahman Hassan was not a member of the Muslim brotherhood and that he didn't participate in the 2019 Egyptian protests. The Sudanese embassy in Cairo stated that it was in contact with Egyptian authorities and that Abdelrahman Hassan was charged with terrorism and membership of a banned organisation.

On 29 September, the Egyptian ambassador in Khartoum was summoned and informed of concerns about Abdelrahman Hassan. The Sudanese Foreign Ministry protested against the Egyptian refusal to allow the Sudanese embassy in Cairo to meet Abdelrahman Hassan and asked for Abdelrahman Hassan to be given his full legal rights by the Egyptian authorities. Abdelrahman Hassan was released on 2 October and the Sudanese embassy in Cairo said that he would depart Cairo the same evening to return to Khartoum.

=== International bodies ===
European Parliament

According to the European Parliament (EP), as of 23 October 2019, there had been "no official, strong and united public response [forthcoming] from the [European Union] and its Member States to the September–October 2019 crackdown in Egypt". In Resolution 2019/2880(RSP), the EP strongly condemned the crackdown and "[reminded] Egypt that any response by the security forces should be in line with international norms and standards and its own Constitution." In the resolution, the EP itemised 18 comments, requests, instructions and demands to Egyptian and European Union authorities and to the African Commission on Human and Peoples' Rights in relation to the crackdown and other human rights issues in Egypt.

=== The United States ===
On 23 September, between the two major protests in the fall of 2019, Sisi met with U.S. President Donald Trump at the United Nations General Assembly. In reference to the protests, Trump stated that "everybody has demonstrations" and that "Egypt has a great leader." He reiterated his support for a strong relationship between Egypt and the United States. Trump said that Sisi has brought order and stability to his country. At the meeting, Sisi claimed that the cause of the protests was "political Islam."

== See also ==
- 2019–2021 Algerian protests
- Human rights in Egypt
- Sudanese Revolution
- 17 October Revolution
- 2019–2021 Iraqi protests
- November 2011 uprising in Egypt
- 2011 Egyptian protest movement
