= Al-Shorouk =

Egyptian newspaper

Al Shorouk الشروق
- Type: Daily
- Format: Broadsheet
- Owner: Al Shorouk Company
- Founder: Ibrahim El Moellam
- Publisher: Dar El Shorouk publishing house
- Founded: 2009; 17 years ago
- Political alignment: Center-left
- Language: Arabic
- Headquarters: Cairo
- Website: Official website

Al-Shorouk, Shorouk News or Al-Shuruq (Arabic: الشروق "The Sunrise") is a prominent Arabic newspaper published in Egypt and several other Arabic nations. It is a daily independent liberal-oriented newspaper, covering mainly politics, militant affairs and sport.

== History ==
The paper was launched by Dar El Shorouk publishing house in February 2009. The founder and owner of the paper is Ibrahim Al Moellam, who also owns El Tahrir daily. It was published as an independent newspaper by "the Egyptian Company for Arabic and International Publishing" and founded in Mohamed Kamel Morsi St., Mohandessin. The publisher is Dar Al Shorouk.

Following the 2013 Egyptian coup d'état which deposed President Mohammed Morsi, it was closed down for two consecutive days due to the publication of an article written by journalist Belal Fadl who later resigned from the newspaper.

== Content ==
Its coverage ranges from for example the 2009 Egypt–Algeria World Cup dispute to important political issues and activity and interviews of militant Islamists. In late August and early September 2009, it published a document entitled al-Badil al-Thalith bayna al-Istibdad wa-al-Istislam (The Third Alternative between Despotism and Surrender) written by then incarcerated Abbud al-Zumar and Tarek al-Zumar

== Circulation ==
The printed version of the paper is not among the top ten, but the circulation of the paper became 150,000 copies during the 25 January revolution in 2011. On the other hand, its online version is ranked third among online newspapers in the Middle East in 2012.

== Editors ==
Between 2008 and 2009 Hani Shukrallah served as the paper's editor-in-chief. As of 2014, the editor-in-chief is Emad El-Din Hussein.
