= Essam al-Qamari =

Egyptian military officer

Qamari was a courageous man who did not fear anyone in his struggle to follow the path of God, even to the extent of rashness. It was the rashness which caused him a lot of problems with his brethren from the Islamist movements...

— Montasser el-Zayat

Essam Al-Qamari (Arabic: عصام القمري, alias Zakariyya) was a decorated tank commander and Major in the Egyptian army who smuggled weapons and ammunition from army strongholds for al-Jihad as a "disciple" of the late Sayyid Qutb.

In February 1981, Egyptian police arrested a man smuggling weapons who was carrying a map of the military's tank placements. Realising that he would likely be implicated, al-Qamari took the opportunity to disappear. He is believed to have hidden at a Gamaliyya apartment owned by Muhammad Abdelrahim al-Sharqawi, that generated profits as a turnery, before acquiring another apartment in Giza with help from Ameen Yusef al-Domeiry. Meanwhile, he acquired a number of hand grenades for Abbud al-Zumar, and experimented trying to build a timer-detonator using a fan and a broken light bulb, although it failed.

He later strenuously opposed Omar Abdel-Rahman's leadership of al-Gama'a al-Islamiyya with other jihadist groups following the assassination of Anwar Sadat.

In 1988, he escaped from prison along with Khamis Muslim and Mohamed al-Aswani, ostensibly aided by Khaled Medhet al-Fiqi.

When Ayman al-Zawahiri was arrested, he was immediately asked the whereabouts of al-Qamari and told them he was staying at the Gamaliyya turnery. Since they had spoken earlier in the day about meeting at the Kit Kat Mosque, Zawahiri agreed to meet as scheduled and allow the Egyptians to arrest al-Qamari when he entered. He was arrested while performing the Nafl salat.
