= Hazem Hosny =

Egyptian political scientist (1951–2024)

- حازم حسني
- Born: 1951; Cairo, Egypt
- Died: 4 February 2024 (aged 73)
- Occupation: Political scientist

Hazem Hosny (Arabic: حازم حسني); also spelled Hazem Hosni; (1951 – 4 February 2024) was an Egyptian political scientist. He was Professor of Political Science at Cairo University.

== Background ==
Hazem Hosny was born in Cairo, Egypt in 1951. He died on 4 February 2024, at the age of 73.

== Criticism of Sisi ==
Hosny criticised the policies of Abdel Fatah al-Sisi with Mahmoud Refaat. In January 2018 he supported Sami Anan's bid to contest Sisi in the 2018 Egyptian presidential election.

== Arrest ==
Hosny was arrested without a warrant and held incommunicado in late September 2019 during the 2019 Egyptian protests. His legal defence team called for him to be released immediately. Hosny had earlier described Mohamed Ali, who earlier in September had published a video accusing Sisi of corruption and calling for street protests, as playing a "positive role" and described the new protest movement as having the potential to affect the "international formula that largely determines Sisi's continued rule". Hosny argued in favour of "[stripping] Sisi of his dictatorial control of the Egyptian state".

Egyptian authorities released Hosny on 23 February 2021, after he spent about a year and a half in pre-trial detention, under the condition that he stay at home as part of his conditional release.
