= Khaled Dawoud =

Egyptian politician

Leader of the Constitution Party
- In office 25 January 2017 – 13 May 2018
- Preceded by: Hala Shukrallah
- Succeeded by: Sayyed Kassem (interim)

Personal details
- Party: Egyptian Social Democratic Party; Constitution Party; Pioneer Party

Khaled Dawoud is the former leader of the Constitution Party of Egypt.

== Career ==
Dawoud has been a journalist for Al-Ahram Weekly since 1996.

Dawoud was a founding member of the Pioneer Party and planned to run in the 2011–12 Egyptian parliamentary election.

Dawoud resigned as a spokesperson for the National Salvation Front (NSF) on 16 August 2013 in protest at the support of police violence against Mohamed Morsi supporters by the NSF. Dawoud was stabbed by Mohammed Morsi supporters on 4 October 2013.

He was appointed the head of the Constitution Party on 25 January 2017 and resigned as the head of the party on 13 May 2018.

Following video releases by Mohamed Ali in September 2019 accusing Sisi of corruption and calling for anti-Sisi street protests, Dawoud called for investigations of the corruption claims. He was arrested on 25 September 2019, after protests across Egypt started on 21 and 22 September. On 14 April 2020, Dawoud was released from jail.

Dawoud ran against Gameela Ismail for the leadership of the party in June 2022, which he lost.

He resigned as the spokesperson of the Civil Democratic Movement over the shifting of decision-making from a consensual model to a vote-based model, and later joined the Egyptian Social Democratic Party.

Party political offices
Preceded by Hala Shukrallah	Leader of the Constitution Party; 2017–2018	Succeeded by Sayyed Kassam
