= APCSS =

APCSS may refer to:

- Al-Ahram Center for Political and Strategic Studies, an Egyptian research institute specializing in political science
- Asia-Pacific Center for Security Studies, a U.S. Department of Defense institute in Hawaii
