= CS gas =

Chemical irritant; also known as tear gas

- Skeletal formula of CS gas

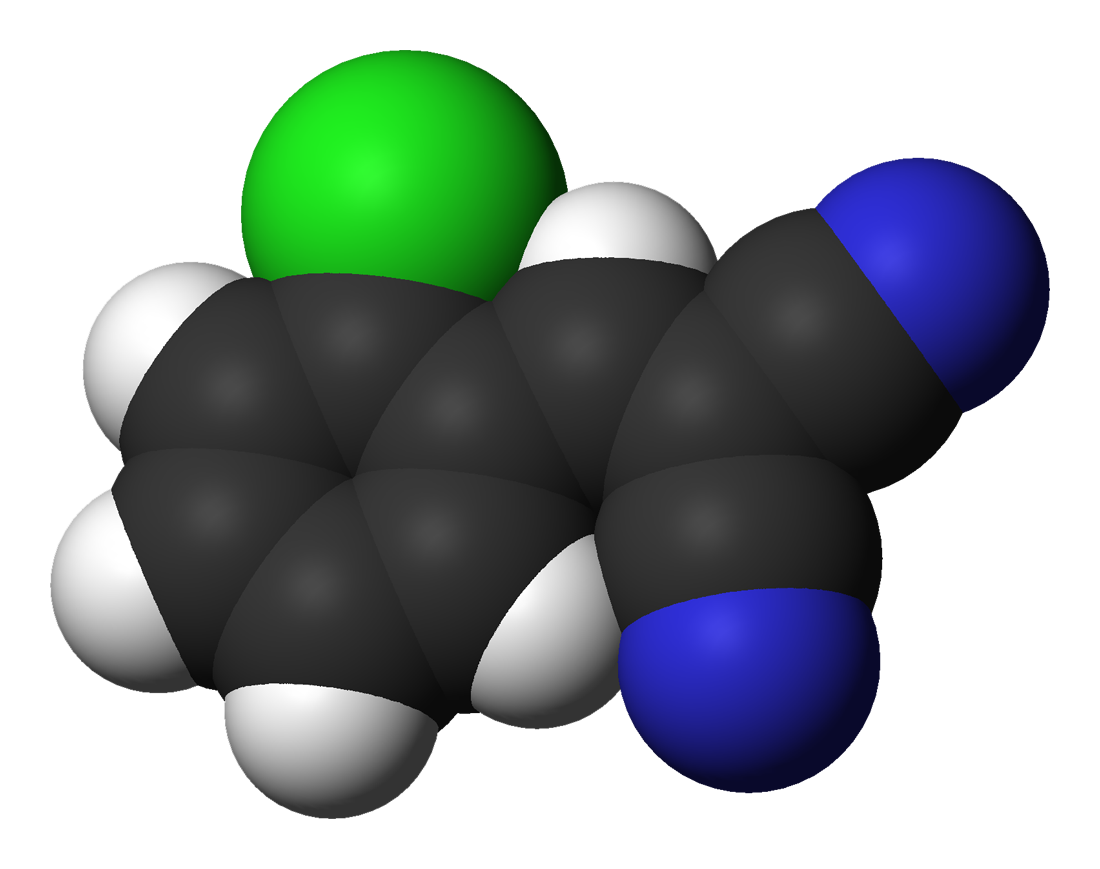
- Space-filling model of CS gas

Names
- Preferred IUPAC name [(2-Chlorophenyl)methylidene]propanedinitrile
- Other names 2-(2-Chlorobenzylidene)malononitrile; 2-Chlorobenzalmalononitrile o-Chlorobenzylidene malononitrile Tear gas

Identifiers
CAS Number	2698-41-1
3D model (JSmol)	Interactive image
ChEMBL	ChEMBL1256101
ChemSpider	16644
ECHA InfoCard	100.018.435
EC Number	220-278-9
IUPHAR/BPS	4158
PubChem CID	17604
RTECS number	OO3675000
UNII	D8317IAV7Q
UN number	2810, 3276, 2811
CompTox Dashboard (EPA)	DTXSID9020297
- InChI: InChI=1S/C10H5ClN2/c11-10-4-2-1-3-9(10)5-8(6-12)7-13/h1-5H Key: JJNZXLAFIPKXIG-UHFFFAOYSA-N; InChI=1/C10H5ClN2/c11-10-4-2-1-3-9(10)5-8(6-12)7-13/h1-5H Key: JJNZXLAFIPKXIG-UHFFFAOYAA
- SMILES: Clc1ccccc1\C=C(/C#N)C#N

Properties
Chemical formula	C_{10}H_{5}ClN_{2}
Molar mass	188.6 g/mol
Appearance	White crystalline powder Colourless gas when burned
Odor	Pepper-like
Density	1.04 g/cm^{3}
Melting point	93 °C (199 °F; 366 K)
Boiling point	310 °C (590 °F; 583 K)
Solubility in water	Insoluble
Vapor pressure	3.4×10^{−5} mmHg at 20 °C

Hazards
- GHS labelling
Pictograms	(GHS06: Toxic) (GHS07: Exclamation mark) (GHS08: Health hazard) (GHS09: Environmental hazard)
Signal word	Danger
Hazard statements	H301, H315, H317, H319, H330, H334, H335, H400, H411
Precautionary statements	P233, P260, P264, P264+P265, P270, P271, P272, P273, P280, P284, P301+P316, P302+P352, P304+P340, P305+P351+P338, P316, P319, P320, P321, P330, P333+P317, P337+P317, P342+P316, P362+P364, P391, P403, P403+P233, P405, P501
NFPA 704 (fire diamond)	2 1 0
- Lethal dose or concentration (LD, LC)
LC_{Lo} (lowest published)	1806 mg/m^{3} (rat, 45 min); 2753 mg/m^{3} (mouse, 20 min); 1802 mg/m^{3} (rabbit, 10 min); 2326 mg/m^{3} (guinea pig, 10 min)
- NIOSH (US health exposure limits)
PEL (Permissible)	TWA 0.05 ppm (0.4 mg/m^{3})
REL (Recommended)	C 0.05 ppm (0.4 mg/m^{3}) [skin]
IDLH (Immediate danger)	2{ mg/m^{3}

Related compounds
Related compounds	SDBS 5-chloro-2-quinolinecarbonitrile 6-chloro-2-quinolinecarbonitrile 7-chloro-2-quinolinecarbonitrile
- Except where otherwise noted, data are given for materials in their standard state (at 25 °C [77 °F], 100 kPa). verify (what is ?) Infobox references

The compound 2-chlorobenzalmalononitrile (also called o-chlorobenzylidene malononitrile; chemical formula: C_{10}H_{5}ClN_{2}), a cyanocarbon, is the defining component of the lachrymatory agent commonly called CS gas, a tear gas used as a riot control agent, and is banned for use in warfare pursuant to the 1925 Geneva Protocol.

Exposure causes a burning sensation and tearing of the eyes to the extent that the subject cannot keep their eyes open, and a burning irritation of the mucous membranes of the nose, mouth and throat, resulting in profuse coughing, nasal mucus discharge, disorientation, and difficulty breathing, partially incapacitating the subject. CS gas is an aerosol of a volatile solvent (a substance that dissolves other active substances and that easily evaporates) and 2-chlorobenzalmalononitrile, which is a solid compound at room temperature. CS gas is generally accepted as being a non-lethal weapon.

Variants include CS1, a micronized powder containing 5% hydrophobic silica aerogel; and CS2, a micro-encapsulated, siliconized form of CS1.

== History ==
CS gas was first synthesized by two Americans, Ben Corson and Roger Stoughton, at Middlebury College in Vermont in 1928; the chemical's name is derived from the first letters of the scientists' surnames.

CS was developed and tested secretly at Porton Down in Wiltshire, UK, in the 1950s and 1960s.

A large cloud of CS gas is dispersed as part of US Navy training

As recently as 2002, the U.S. State Department Bureau of International Security and Nonproliferation made a firm distinction between "riot-control agents" such as CS gas, and "lethal chemical weapons." The Bureau cited support for this position from the U.K. and Japan.

The use of CS in warfare has been prohibited under the Chemical Weapons Convention. The legal basis is Article I, paragraph 5, which states: "Each State Party undertakes not to use riot control agents as a method of warfare." where "riot control agents" are defined as "any chemical not listed in a Schedule, which can produce rapidly in humans sensory irritation or disabling physical effects which disappear within a short time following termination of exposure". The goal is to preserve a clear international rule even regarding "less-than-lethal" agents used in warfare. Such agents could be used to force soldiers out of trenches, bunkers, or protected positions, making them vulnerable to gunfire or explosives. It could therefore facilitate lethal attacks even if the gas itself were not intended to kill. The Organisation for the Prohibition of Chemical Weapons (OPCW), the governing body of the convention, has observed its use in the Russo-Ukrainian War in 2024.

== Production ==
CS is synthesized by the reaction of 2-chlorobenzaldehyde and malononitrile via the Knoevenagel condensation:

Preparation of CS

ClC_{6}H_{4}CHO + H_{2}C(CN)_{2} → ClC_{6}H_{4}CHC(CN)_{2} + H_{2}O

The reaction is catalysed with a weak base like piperidine or pyridine. The production method has not changed since the substance was discovered by Corson and Stoughton. Other bases, solvent free methods and microwave promotion have been suggested to improve the production of the substance.

The physiological properties had been discovered already by the chemists first synthesising the compound in 1928: "Physiological Properties. Certain of these dinitriles have the effect of sneeze and tear gases. They are harmless when wet, but to handle the dry powder is disastrous."

=== Use as an aerosol ===
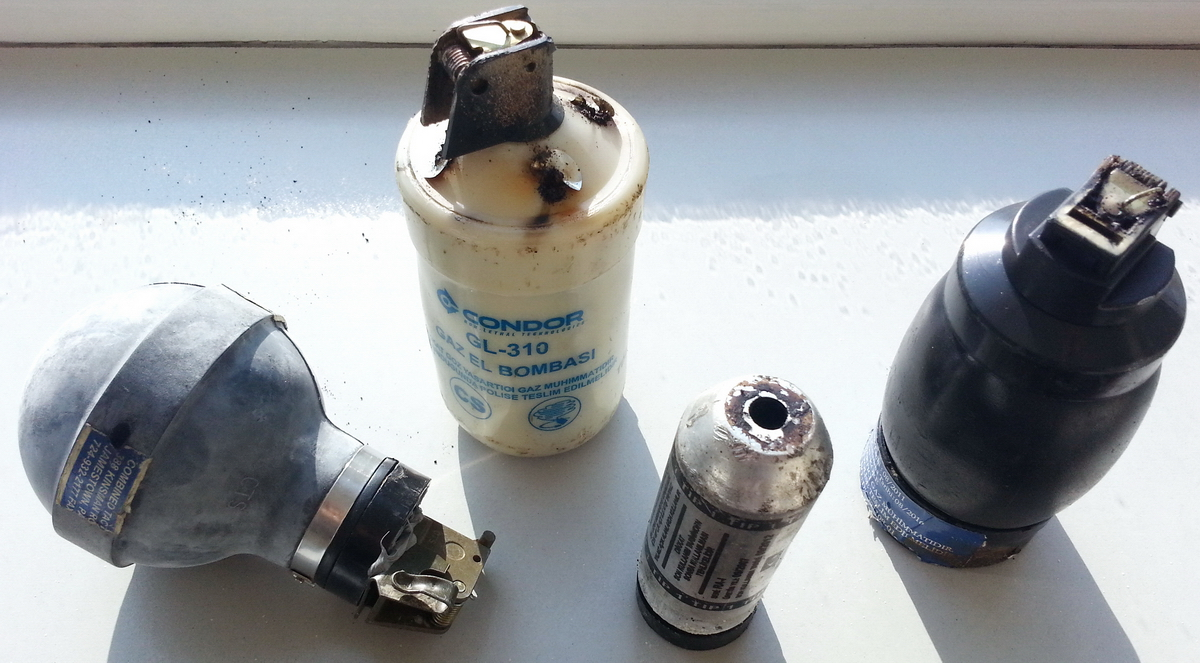
CS gas shells used in Taksim Gezi Park, Istanbul in May 2013

As 2-chlorobenzalmalononitrile is a solid at room temperature, not a gas, a variety of techniques have been used to make this solid usable as an aerosol:

- Melted and sprayed in the molten form.
- Dissolved in organic solvent (such as alcohol, ether, carbon sulfide, or methylchloroform).
- CS2 dry powder (a siliconized, micro-pulverized form of CS).
- CS from thermal grenades by generation of hot gases.

In the 1993 Waco siege in the United States, CS was dissolved in the organic solvent dichloromethane (also known as methylene chloride). The solution was dispersed as an aerosol through explosive force and when the highly volatile dichloromethane evaporated, CS crystals precipitated and formed a fine dispersion in the air.

== Effects ==
=== In humans ===
Many types of tear gas and other riot control agents have been produced with effects ranging from mild tearing of the eyes to immediate vomiting and prostration. CN and CS are the most widely used and known, but around 15 different types of tear gas have been developed worldwide; these include adamsite or bromoacetone, CNB, and CNC. CS has become the most popular due to its strong effect. The effect of CS on a person will depend on whether it is packaged as a solution or used as an aerosol. The size of solution droplets and the size of the CS particulates after evaporation are factors determining its effect on the human body.

The chemical reacts with moisture on the skin and in the eyes, causing a burning sensation and the immediate forceful and uncontrollable shutting of the eyes. Effects usually include lacrymation (tears streaming from the eyes); profuse coughing; restricted breathing or chest tightness; exceptional nasal discharge that is full of mucus; irritation or burning in the eyes (including conjunctivitis), eyelids, nose and throat areas; disorientation; and dizziness. It will also burn the skin where sweaty or sunburned. In highly concentrated doses, it can also induce severe coughing and vomiting. Most of the immediate effects wear off within a few hours (such as exceptional nasal discharge and profuse coughing), although respiratory, gastrointestinal, and oral symptoms may persist for months. Skin symptoms, including rashes and erythema, may persist for weeks. Excessive exposure can cause chemical burns resulting in permanent scarring.

Although described as a non-lethal weapon for crowd control, studies have raised doubts about this classification. CS can cause severe lung damage and can also significantly damage the heart and liver. On 28 September 2000, Uwe Heinrich released a study commissioned by John Danforth, of the United States Office of Special Counsel, to investigate the use of CS by the FBI at the Branch Davidians' Mount Carmel compound. He said no human deaths had been reported, but concluded that the lethality of CS used would have been determined mainly by two factors: whether gas masks were used and whether the occupants were trapped in a room. He suggests that if no gas masks were used and the occupants were trapped, then, "there is a distinct possibility that this kind of CS exposure can significantly contribute to or even cause lethal effects".

Adults exposed to tear gas during the 2020 protests in Portland, Oregon, also reported menstrual changes (899; 54.5% of 1650 female respondents). A broader survey found a link between CS gas exposure and reproductive health outcomes in people with uteruses; 83% of respondents "reported at least one adverse reproductive health outcome following exposure to chemical agents used by law enforcement in 2020 and 2021".

Exposure to tear gas is associated with avoidable healthcare utilization.

CS gas can have a clastogenic effect (abnormal chromosome change) on mammalian cells, but no studies have linked it to miscarriages or stillbirths. In Egypt, CS gas was reported to be the cause of death of several protesters in Mohamed Mahmoud Street near Tahrir square during the November 2011 protests. The solvent in which CS is dissolved, methyl isobutyl ketone (MIBK), is classified as harmful by inhalation and irritating to the eyes and respiratory system, and repeated exposure may cause skin dryness or cracking.

Repeated exposure to CS may cause sensitisation.

=== In other animals ===
The dose of CS that is considered lethal for any animal is 25,000 to 150,000 milligrams (mg) per cubed meter-minutes, or 200 mg per kilogram body mass.

One study found that aerosolized CS did not have any effects on healthy horses.

A 1979 study found that amounts of CS as small as 0.2 to 0.3 mg per liter are lethal to rainbow trout.

TRPA1 (Transient Receptor Potential-Ankyrin 1) ion channel expressed on nociceptors, especially the trigeminal nerve, has been implicated as the site of action for CS gas in rodent models.

== Contamination and cleanup ==
People or objects contaminated with CS particles can cause secondary exposure to others, including healthcare professionals and police.

Areas contaminated with CS particulates are difficult to decontaminate because CS particles are not very soluble in water, and they may re-aerosolize, especially in hot conditions. CS1 and CS2 also remain in the environment longer than CS because they contain silicon.

One study found that species from the Chlorella, Lactobacillus, Paramecium, and Saccharomyces genuses can be used for bioremediation of ecosystems contaminated with CS.

== See also ==
- CN gas
- CR gas
- Grenade
- Pepper spray
- Chemical Weapons Convention
  - List of parties to the Chemical Weapons Convention
