= Hassan Nafaa =

Egyptian political scientist

- Occupations: author, political science lecturer
- Organization: Cairo University
- Known for: coordinator of the National Association for Change prior to the 2011 Egyptian revolution.

Hassan Nafaa is an Egyptian writer and professor of political science at Cairo University. He was a coordinator of the National Association for Change, a loose political alliance in Egypt prior to the 2011 Egyptian revolution.

== 2019 arrest ==
At 15:00 UTC on 24 September 2019, during the 2019 Egyptian protests, Nafaa was arrested at his home. Several days earlier, Nafaa had stated to Agence France Presse that "Sisi's desired image as Egypt's saviour from Muslim Brotherhood rule... has been completely dismantled."

== Views ==
=== Egyptian political changes ===
In April 2014, Nafaa was seen by Al-Monitor as seeking a consensus between pro-Mohamed Morsi and pro-Abdel Fattah el-Sisi supporters. Nafaa stated that after Hosni Mubarak resigned, an opportunity to establish a "revolution" was missed when protesting groups and individuals allowed a military council to take power instead of themselves organising a council to discuss and implement the "demands of the revolution". Nafaa also held the Muslim Brotherhood, under Morsi's presidency, for having failed its "real chance to build a democratic system in which everybody can participate". He felt that the Brotherhood and political Islam should be "part of the political landscape, but they should not dominate the system". Nafaa proposed a "wise men" committee to state authorities with the aim of seeking compromise. Nafaa said that "third parties" were treated by the media of constituting sleeper cells associated with the Brotherhood and that he was accused of this by students.

=== Saudi–UAE–Egypt alliance ===
In June 2019, while the Transitional Military Council (TMC) held power in Sudan, and shortled after the 3 June Khartoum massacre, Nafaa argued that there exists a Saudi–UAE–Egypt alliance that "is coordinating counterrevolutions in the Arab world". He stated that travels by TMC leader Abdel Fattah al-Burhan to Cairo were aimed at helping the TMC control Sudan in a similar way to that of the security system in Egypt and to oppose Islamist groups such as the Muslim Brotherhood. Nafaa linked Egyptian support for the TMC to the fear that the Brotherhood would come to power in Sudan in a similar way to the election of Morsi to the Egyptian presidency following the 2011 Egyptian revolution.
