= Tarek Loubani =

Canadian doctor and humanitarian

- Born: Kuwait
- Citizenship: Canada
- Education: Dalhousie University; McGill University; Queen's University
- Occupation: Medical Doctor
- Employer: University of Western Ontario
- Organization: Glia Project
- Awards: Bassel Khartabil Fellowship, Ontario Undergraduate Student Alliance Teaching Award

Tarek Loubani is a Canadian doctor. He runs the Glia Project, which seeks to provide medical supplies to impoverished locations, and developed a low-cost stethoscope in 2015. He serves as Associate Professor at the University of Western Ontario and works in emergency rooms.

In 2013, along with filmmaker John Greyson, he was arbitrarily arrested and spent seven weeks in Egypt's Tora Prison without charges. In 2018 he was shot in the leg while in the Gaza Strip providing medical care during the 2018 border protests.

== Early life and education ==
Loubani was born in Kuwait and lived in Palestine as a child. He is of Palestinian descent, the son of Dr. Mahmoud Loubani, who works at a medical clinic in New Brunswick. When he was nine years old, his family immigrated to Bathurst, New Brunswick as refugees. He attended high school in Bathurst before studying medicine at Dalhousie University, completing family medicine residency at McGill University in Montreal and Emergency Medicine Residency at Queen's University in Kingston Ontario.

== Career ==
Loubani began serving as an assistant professor at the University of Western Ontario in 2010.

In April 2018, the Ontario Undergraduate Student Alliance awarded Loubani with their annual teaching excellence award.

== Humanitarian work ==
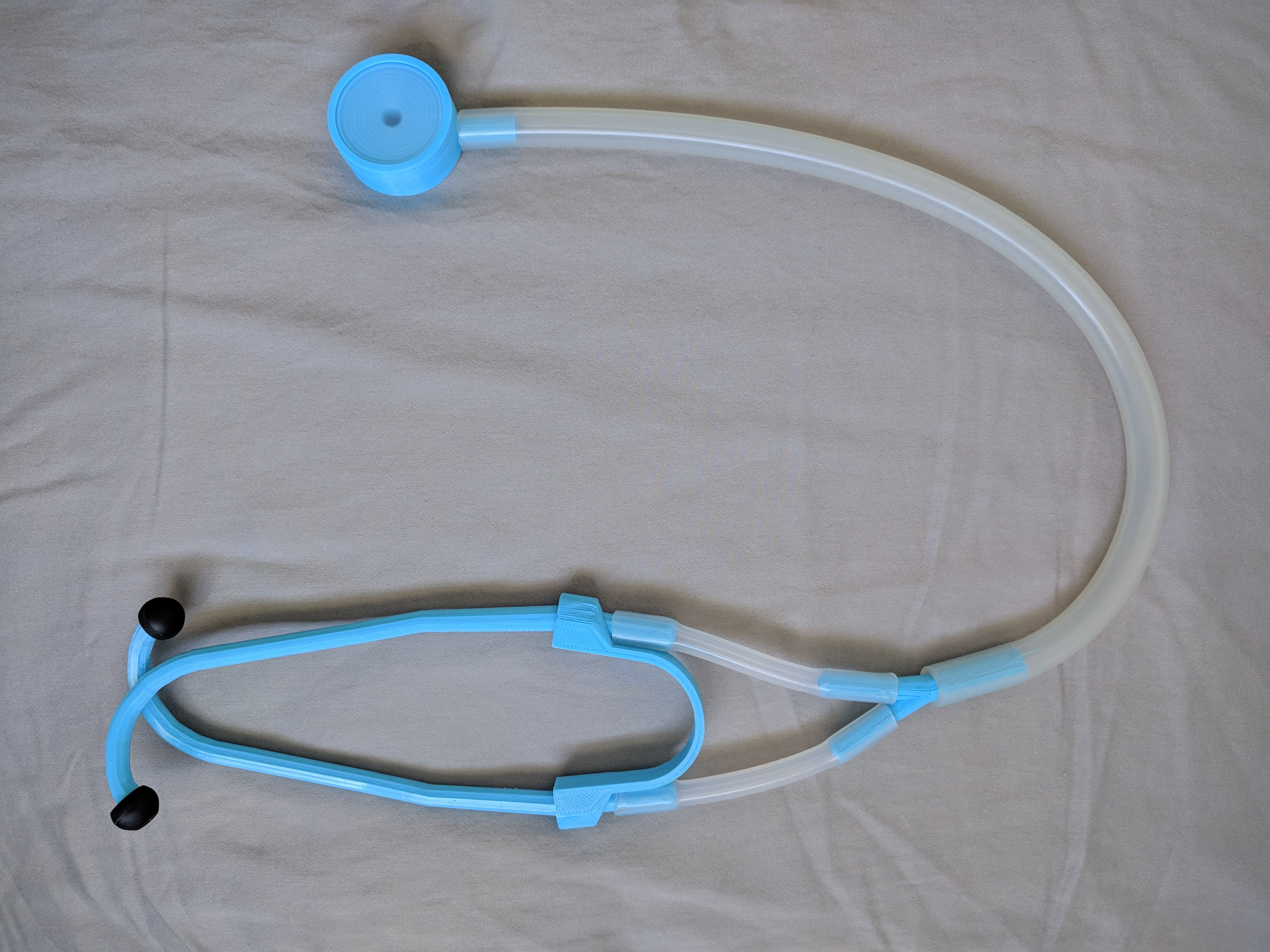
Stethoscope made by Tarek Loubani via 3D printing

In 2015, Loubani designed a low-cost stethoscope which could be made for $2.50 using a 3D printer. He runs the Glia Project, which seeks to provide medical supplies to impoverished areas and has created designs for 3D printable surgical tools such as needle drivers and pulse oximeters.

== Detainment in Egypt ==
On August 15, 2013, Loubani and Greyson arrived in Egypt, intending to travel to Gaza. On August 16, they were arrested and detained in Tora Prison, where they were held without charges and were subjected to physical violence and harsh conditions. Egyptian authorities were considering a number of intended charges against Loubani and Greyson, including murder and "intention to kill," which both men denied. They were released after more than seven weeks in detention.

== Injury in Gaza ==
On Monday May 14, 2018, Loubani was shot in the leg near the border between the Gaza strip and Israel. Loubani was delivering emergency medicine to the protesters and believes he was targeted by an Israeli sniper. The paramedics wore high visibility vests to identify themselves as medical personnel, but in spite of that, Loubani says that a total of 19 medical professionals were shot on that day, including Musa Abuhassanin, the first paramedic to assist Loubani in the field, moments after he was shot. In a May 17, 2018 interview by Democracy Now!'s Amy Goodman, Tarek narrated the moments after he was shot and Abuhassanin's subsequent death.

== Ketchup protest incident ==
On October 22, 2023 Loubani was identified by London Police Service as a suspect in spraying ketchup on a political office. On November 15, 2023, Loubani was arrested and charged with mischief for spraying ketchup on the facade of London MP Peter Fragiskatos constituency office as a form of protest against the alleged genocide being carried out by the IDF in Gaza.

In November 2024, Loubani's charges were dropped, and he again covered Fragiskatos' office with ketchup, hours after the dismissal. Fragiskatos believes Loubani's actions exceed simple protest, although he said he respects the court's decision to withdraw the doctor's charges. On November 15, 2024 Loubani was charged again by London Police for his second incident involving MP Fragiskatos constituency office.

== Awards ==
- Ontario Undergraduate Student Alliance Teaching Award, 2017/2018
- Schulich School of Medicine & Dentistry, Bassel Khartabil Fellowship
