= Hani Shukrallah =

Egyptian journalist and political analyst (1950–2019)

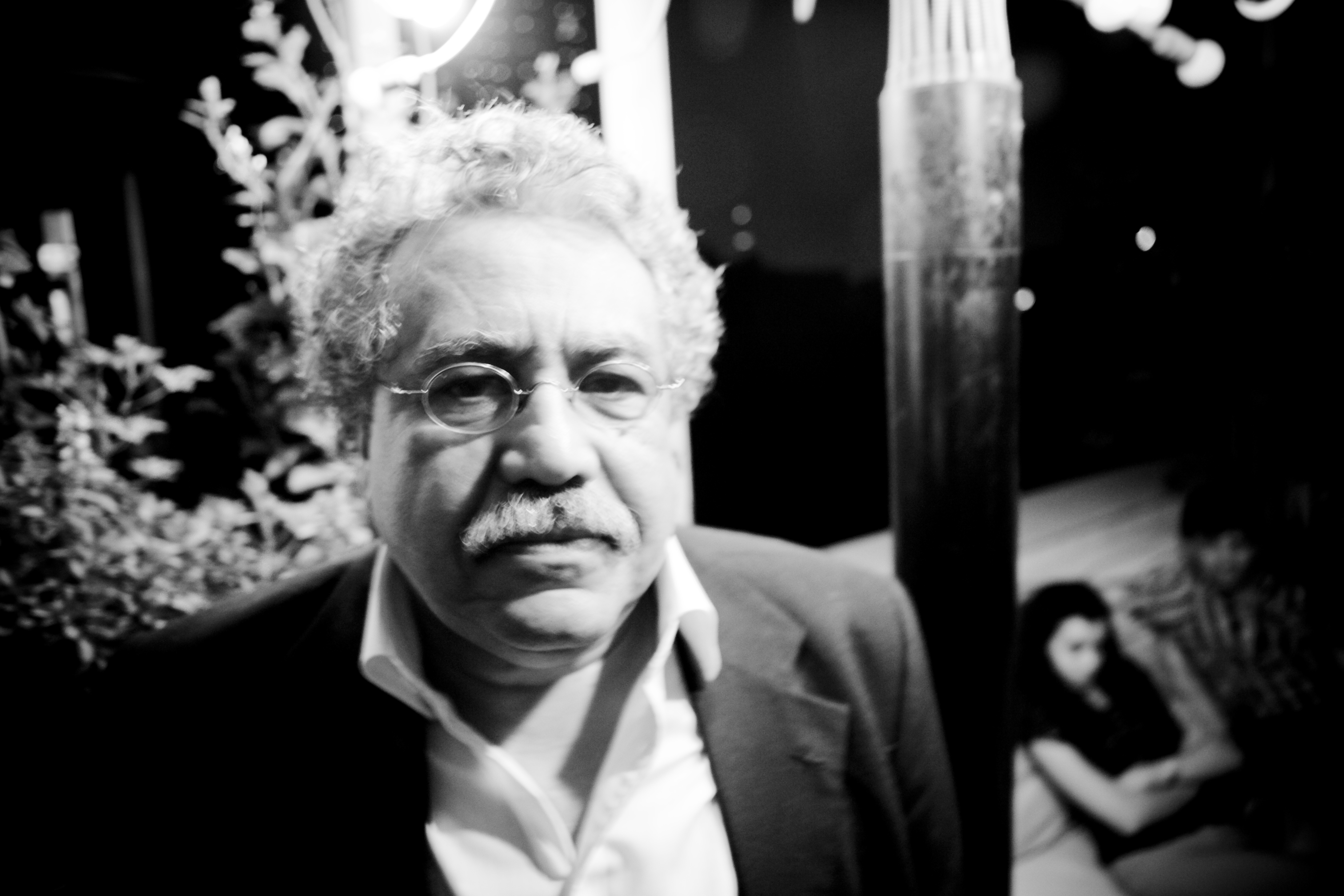
Shukrallah by el-Hamalawy, June 2010

Hani Shukrallah (also spelled Hany; Arabic: هاني شكر الله; 1950 – 5 May 2019) was an Egyptian journalist and political analyst. He was managing editor of Al-Ahram Weekly from 1991 and 2005 and later founder and until February 2011 editor-in-chief of Ahram Online, both part of the state-run Al-Ahram Foundation. He was also the Executive Director of the Heikal Foundation for Arab Journalism.

== Early life and career ==
Shukrallah was born in Cairo, Egypt in 1950 to a Coptic Christian family, and was raised in the city. His sister Hala, is the first Coptic woman to head an Egyptian political party. Throughout the 1970s, he was a student activist during the presidency of Anwar Sadat. He described himself as a "Marxist," but antagonistic of the "dogmatic leftist thinking" that he said marked many of the socialist and communist countries during that period. He became an advocate of the human rights movement in Egypt during this period and together with Saad Eddin Ibrahim co-founded the Egyptian Organization for Human Rights (EOHR) in April 1985, during the presidency of Hosni Mubarak. Shukrallah attests that the EOHR was largely ignored by the government, opposition parties and factions—including Islamists—and the intellectual elite of Egypt and the organization struggled in documenting human rights violations and ensuring the accuracy of victims' testimonies.

== Journalism career ==
In 1991 Shukrallah was appointed managing editor and later editor-in-chief of the state-owned newspaper Al-Ahram Weekly. Starting in 1995, he had his own column, called "Reflections," in the newspaper. He was dismissed as chief editor in July 2005. During that year in particular, Shukrallah had written numerous articles criticizing Egyptian politics and demanding that the Mubarak government make clearer how it would allow for more political liberalization, being skeptical of the promised reforms. He continued to work for the state-run Al-Ahram Foundation which publishes the Al-Ahram Weekly, becoming a consultant to the Al-Ahram Center for Political and Strategic Studies think tank that year, a job he held until late 2008. In 2009 he served as the co-chief editor of the Al-Shorouk daily, a paper he helped establish. In 2010 Shukrallah launched Ahram Online, an English-language news site published by the Al-Ahram Foundation, and served as its editor-in-chief. Throughout his career in journalism, Shukrallah also wrote articles in the London-based Al-Hayat and The Guardian, the Indian magazine Outlook and the Journal of Palestine Studies. The main topics Shukrallah concentrated on were the Egyptian government, domestic politics, political Islam, the Israeli-Palestinian conflict and the United States-led Iraq War and "war on terror".

Following the 2011 Egyptian revolution, Shukrallah joined the Social Democratic Party, but later left the party. He became a critic of the Supreme Council of the Armed Forces, which took power after Mubarak's ouster in February 2011 and claimed they had intended "to stop the revolution at every juncture." He was also critical of the Muslim Brotherhood and supported the ouster of Mohamed Morsi from power, writing that mass protests against Morsi on 30 June "put[ting] somewhere between 30-40 percent of the nation’s adult population on the streets in a single day."

== Bibliography ==
- Akram-Lodhi, A. Haroon (2013), Land, Poverty and Livelihoods in an Era of Globalization: Perspectives from Developing and Transition Countries, Routledge, ISBN 978-1-134-12190-8
- Beinin, Joel (2011), Social Movements, Mobilization, and Contestation in the Middle East and North Africa, Stanford University Press, ISBN 978-0-8047-7778-0
- Khalil, Ashraf (2012), Liberation Square: Inside the Egyptian Revolution and the Rebirth of a Nation, Macmillan, ISBN 978-1-250-00669-1
