= Ezzat Ghoniem =

Egyptian lawyer and human rights activist

- Born: Egypt
- Occupation(s): Lawyer, human rights activist

Ezzat Ghoniem is an Egyptian lawyer and human rights activist. Director of the NGO Egyptian Coordination for Rights and Freedoms, he disappeared on 1 March 2018 and was interrogated for three days before detention as part of a "human rights terrorism" plot.

== Background ==
Ghoniem has acted in defence of many members of the Muslim Brotherhood. After the Egyptian regime hanged 15 Islamists found guilty of terrorism charges in December 2017, Ghoniem criticized the "new wave of oppression", claiming that "these executions will only push the thousands of young people in prison into the arms of Daesh".

His disappearance on 1 March 2018 prompted immediate concerns by Amnesty International that he had been forcibly disappeared by the Egyptian state. While he was interrogated for three days, authorities withheld information about his whereabouts. The Ministry of the Interior later showed excerpts from his interrogation on its Facebook page, claiming that Ghoniem was part of an organized "human rights terrorism" plot. Since interrogation he has been detained in Tora Prison.

== See also ==
- List of kidnappings
