= Egyptian National Action Group =

- Established: 29 December 2019 (6 years ago)
- Founders: Ayman Nour
- Types: voluntary association
- Aim: regime change
- Country: Egypt

The Egyptian National Action Group or ENAG is a group of expatriate Egyptians created in December 2019 with the aim of overthrowing what is described by the group as military rule in Egypt.

== Creation ==
In December 2019, a group of expatriate Egyptians, including Ayman Nour, a candidate in the 2005 Egyptian presidential election who was held under arrest during six weeks prior to the election, and for four years following the election, announced the creation of the Egyptian National Action Group.

== Aim ==
ENAG's stated aim is to overthrow what is described by the group as military rule in Egypt. The group claimed to have reached "consensus on a number of principles and priorities". Ayman Nour described the "values that unite" ENAG as "democracy, human dignity, justice, equality and freedom". ENAG criticised the Egyptian government, led by president Abdel Fattah al-Sisi, for repression of dissidents, and for "neglect[ing] the homeland's wealth and capabilities, humiliat[ing] and suppress[ing] citizens and endanger[ing] Egypt's national security". In January 2020, Nour judged Sisi's government to be "weak and frightened".

In January 2020, Nour claimed that ENAG had "developed a consensus document ... setting out [ENAG's] common vision of the post-dictatorship era, including a transition period" and was designing a "comprehensive and collaborative national project ... to address the most urgent questions around the economy, restructuring of state institutions and limiting of the army's role." Middle East Observer described ENAG's aims in the context of a 28 December 2019 "Egyptian Consensus Document" announced by Mohamed Ali.

== Composition and leadership ==
Ayman Nour presented himself as ENAG's spokesperson. He described the group's composition as including people from "diverse political backgrounds" who "set [their] differences aside" in order to create the group. He claimed that the nature of the group was "unprecedented". Nour suggested that the group includes "centrists, liberals, leftists [and] Islamists".

== Reports and actions ==
On 2 January 2020, ENAG criticised Egyptian military involvement in the 2019–2020 Western Libya offensive of the Second Libyan Civil War. ENAG viewed the Egyptian participation as being "in favour of a rogue putschist group that has moved in violation of legitimacy, fighting against the legitimate government that has been produced by the Skhirat Agreement, sponsored by the United Nations and recognised by the whole world, including Egypt."

On 13 January 2020, the day when Moustafa Kassem, a United States citizen imprisoned in Egypt died after a hunger strike, ENAG stated that 300 detainees in the maximum security wing of Tora Prison had been on hunger strike since 5 January, when a prisoner had died as a result of inadequate medical care.
