= Hala Shukrallah =

Egyptian politician

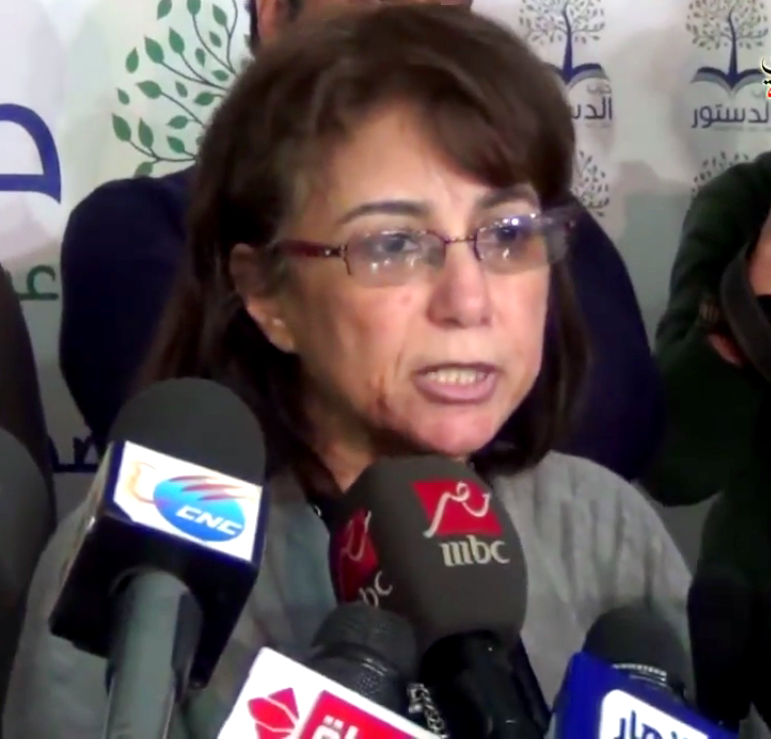

Leader of the Constitution Party
- In office 21 February 2014 – 24 April 2015
- Preceded by: Sayyed Kassam (acting); Mohamed ElBaradei
- Succeeded by: Khaled Dawoud

Personal details
- Born: 1954 (age 71–72)
- Party: Constitution Party

Hala Shukrallah (Arabic: هالة شكر الله; born 1954) is the former president of the Egyptian Constitution Party.

== Career ==
She succeeded Sayed Kassem, who was the interim leader of the party, in February 2014. She is the first Coptic woman to head an Egyptian political party. As president of the Constitution Party, Shukrallah had articulated as major goals the revitalization and expansion of the party, as well as the achievement of revolutionary objectives, such as repeal of the protest law, opposition to military domination of politics, and freedom for political prisoners.

Her appointment ended in April 2015.

== Personal life ==
Her brother is Hani Shukrallah, who was the founder of Ahram Online.

Party political offices
Preceded by Sayyed Kassam	Leader of the Constitution Party; 2014–2015	Succeeded by Khaled Dawoud
