= Tarek al-Zumar =

Egyptian politician

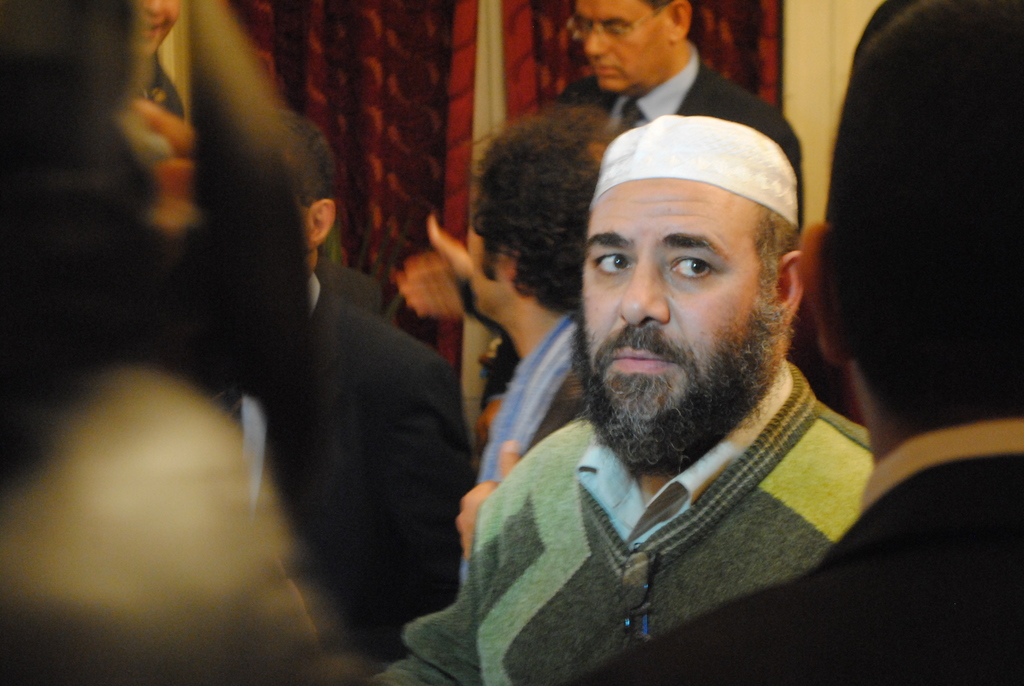
Tarek al-Zumar

Tarek al-Zumar is an Egyptian Islamist politician and the secretary-general of the Building and Development Party. The party has a non-political wing named al-Gama'a al-Islamiyya.

== History ==
Al-Zumar was a member of Egyptian Islamic Jihad. His cousin is Aboud El Zomor, who was imprisoned along with him.

Al-Zumar was imprisoned in 1984 on suspicion of involvement in the assassination of Anwar Sadat and was released during the Egyptian Revolution of 2011. Al-Zumar and his cousin received a hero's welcome from the Muslim Brotherhood when they were released from prison.

On October 6, 2012, al-Zumar was invited to attend a speech by Mohamed Morsi on the anniversary of the Yom Kippur War, seen as one of Sadat's great accomplishments. His attendance overshadowed the content of Morsi's speech and offended many non-Brotherhood Egyptians.

On 14 July 2013 Egypt's prosecutor general Hisham Barakat ordered his assets to be frozen. Afterwards, al-Zumar fled to Qatar.
