= Independence Party (Egypt) =

Political party in Egypt

Independence Party حزب الاستقلال Hezb Al-Istiqlal
- Leader: Magdy Hussein
- Ideology: Islamism
- Political position: Left-wing
- House of Representatives: 0 / 568

The Independence Party is an Islamist political party in Egypt. The party was banned by the Cairo Urgent Matters Court on 29 September 2014. The party withdrew from the Anti-Coup Alliance on 30 November 2014. Many members of the party were arrested following the 2019 Egyptian protests.
