= Muhammad Abdelrahim al-Sharqawi =

Muhammad Abdelrahim al-Sharqawi was an alleged member of Egyptian Islamic Jihad and was one of the closest colleagues of Ayman al-Zawahiri. whom he had known since 1968.

He was accused of establishing a turnery in the Gamaliyya district of Cairo, where he boosted the group's revenues by manufacturing wooden gunparts. It is believed that Essam al-Qamari hid in the turnery after his 1981 defection from the Egyptian army. however he was acquitted by the state security court.

An engineer by trade, he was also accused of recruiting members for the group, however he was not convicted by any court and

When Pakistan arrested him and extradited him to Egypt, the "fears of Arab Afghan leaders skyrocketed" as it signalled the start of a "war" against the Mujahideen fighting the Soviet invasion of Afghanistan. he was under administrative detention for 17 years in different Egyptian jails despite receiving more than 20 release orders from Egyptian courts, he was the released after Husny Mubarak was removed from power in 2011
