= November 2011 uprising in Egypt =

Political demonstration

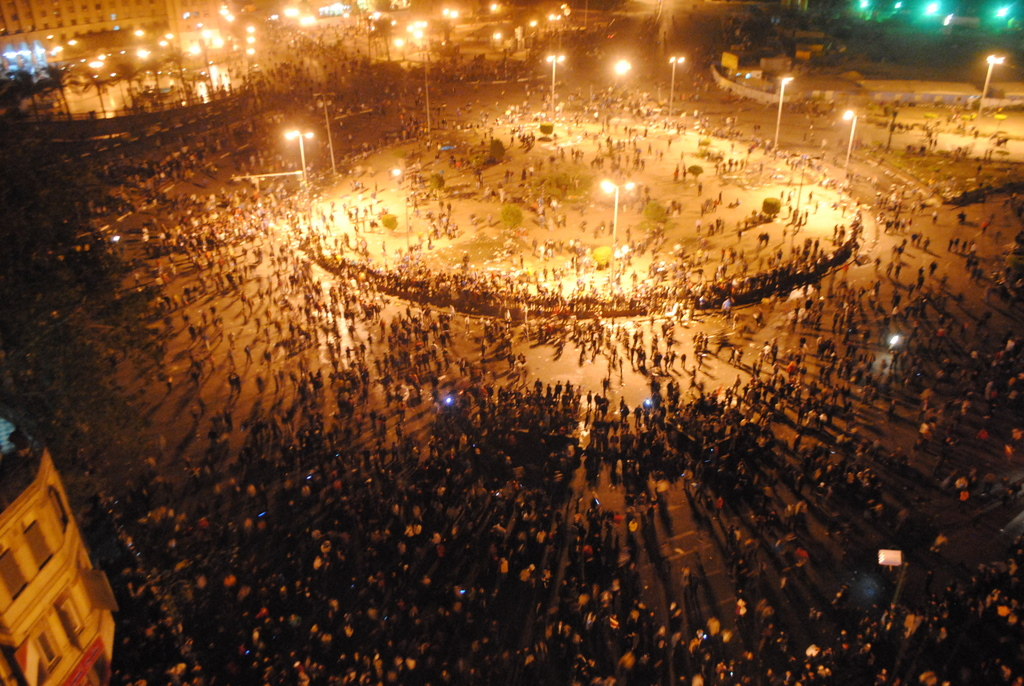
- Date: November 18, 2011 – November 22, 2011
- Location: Egypt
- Caused by: Military interim government
- Goals: Resignation of President Mohamed Hussein Tantawi; Fresh general elections
- Methods: Demonstrations, riots
- Result: Protests suppressed by force

Deaths and injuries
- Deaths: 19-34
- Injuries: 150+

The 2011 Egyptian protest movement was rioting, strikes and melees across the country of Egypt demanding the military regime of Mohamed Hussein Tantawi to step down from power.

In November 2011, dissatisfied with the progress of the reforms, almost all civilian political parties called for an accelerated end to the military rule before drafting a constitution — either an immediate handover to a civilian-led government, or a turnover to the lower house of Parliament when it is seated in April, or after a presidential election, which would be scheduled as soon as possible. A major difference between Egyptian revolutionaries is that secular groups want the election to be postponed since they believe that the election would favor religious parties and well established groups like the Muslim Brotherhood while those parties want the parliamentary elections to be held on time. On the other hand, they are united in their demand that the military should get out of politics and stop imposing restrictions on the future constitution and allow democratically elected representatives of Egyptians to freely write the new constitution.

The protesters are demanding the SCAF to step down from governing and politics, and hand over the authority to civilians. Other demands include banning former members of Hosni Mubarak's regime from running in the next election, and rejection of the military's super-constitution (which restricts the power of the future elected representative in writing the new constitution, gives the military the power to select up to 80 percent of the membership committee that writes the new constitution, and removes the possibility of civilian control of the military and Egypt's foreign policy which will allow the military to act as a state within a state in Egypt, a system similar to Turkey's Deep State before democratic reforms). The protesters state that the situation has not improved during the last 10 months under military government. Media and freedom of expression has become even more restricted, civilian political activists are being tried in military courts for insulting military, human rights situation has not improved, the emergency law (which gives government extraordinary powers and the right to ignore laws) continues, and the military junta continues to use the same methods that Mubarak was using. They are also angry at Field Marshal Tantavi's statement announced on TV which implies that military wants to remain involved in politics and will not return to barracks even after presidential elections.

On 19 November, two people were killed and 600 wounded in violent clashes after mass protests in Tahrir Square against the military junta regime. The protests started in reaction to the military unilaterally announcing a super-constitution that representatives elected for writing the constitution will not be able to change.

Egyptian medics say a police and army assault on anti-government protesters in Cairo has killed at least three people, raising the death toll in Egypt to at least five killed in two days of unrest. Police in Cairo lobbed teargas into crowds of protesters angry at the military government's continued role in political life. Demonstrators kept control of Tahrir Square Sunday morning, and vowed to keep their revolution alive.

Protesters demanding faster reforms and establishment of civilian government took to the Tahrir square in Cairo, and also in other cities, and clashed with the security forces. On 21 November 2011, after several days of violent demonstrations in which more than 33 protesters lost their lives and over 1,500 were wounded, the provisional government offered its resignation to the supreme military council in reaction to the use of force against the protesters.

At a crisis meeting on 22 November 2011 between the political and the military leaders, the parties agreed for a new interim government to be formed, and to proceed with the scheduled parliamentary election on 28 November, with a goal of holding a presidential election before the end of June 2012. Also on the same day, the US State Department condemned the excessive use of force against the demonstrators by the Egyptian security forces.

== See also ==
- 2011 Egyptian Revolution
