= Al-Ahram Center for Political and Strategic Studies =

Egyptian research institute specializing in political science

The al-Ahram Center for Political and Strategic Studies (ACPSS) is an Egyptian research institute specializing in political science created in 1968 as part of the al-Ahram Foundation.

== Independence ==
In October 2019, during the Abdel Fattah el-Sisi presidency, Agence France Presse described APCSS as "state-supportive".

== Sociopolitical analyses ==
The APCSS ran opinion polls to predict outcomes of the first round of the 2012 Egyptian presidential election on 23–24 May 2012, the first following the 2011 Egyptian revolution. Polls published by the APCSS on 14 and 19 May put Amr Moussa in the first place and Ahmed Shafik in second, without 32 and 23 percent of votes, respectively, both well ahead of Mohamed Morsi with 15 percent support. The polls did show Morsi's support increasing. The result was that Morsi received slightly more support than Shafik in the first round, and won the second-round election, becoming the first democratically elected president of Egypt.

During the 2019 Egyptian protests of September 2019, former member of parliament and member of the APCSS Amr el-Shobaki commented on the role of the Muslim Brotherhood, of which former President Morsi had been a prominent member, in the protests. El-Shobaki said that after the 2013 Egyptian coup d'état that had overthrown Morsi, the Brotherhood remained weakened and was neither the organizer nor a participant in the 20 September protests.
