= Aboud El Zomor =

Egyptian colonel

- Born: 19 August 1948 (age 78)
- Military career
- Allegiance: Egypt
- Branch: Egyptian Army
- Service years: 1969–1981
- Rank: Lieutenant Colonel
- Unit: 115th Mechanized Infantry Regiment
- Commands: Central Military Zone Military Intelligent Department, Battalion "D"

Aboud El Zomor (also Abboud el-Zumar, Abbud el-Zumar, Aboud el-Zomoor, Abboud el-Zomor, Abboud el-Zomor, Abod Zoummar, Egyptian Arabic: عبود الزمر, romanized: Abbud el-Zummor, ɑb̑ud elZ̑ʋmor, born August 1948) is an Egyptian Islamist and fundamentalist and former military intelligence colonel in the Egyptian Army.

== Early life ==
Born into one of the wealthiest and most prominent families in the Giza Governorate, he was founder and first emir of the Egyptian Islamic Jihad, succeeded by Ayman al-Zawahiri (released from prison in 1984), an organization which merged into al-Qaeda in 1998. He entered the Egyptian Military Academy in 1966 and served as an auxiliary reserve officer in a Signals battalion during the Six Day War.

== Officer ==
He was commissioned as an officer in the Mechanized Infantry forces of the Egyptian Army in 1969 and served with distinction, commanding a platoon of BMP-1 armoured vehicles and an Anti-Tank company in the Yom Kippur War. His Anti-Tank company achieved at least 24 Israeli tank kills during the war. He joined the Military Intelligence department in 1974. He was promoted to lieutenant colonel in 1979.

== Prison ==
He was sentenced to life imprisonment in Cairo after being captured by the Egyptian government for being implicated in the assassination of President Anwar Sadat on 6 October 1981. He had previously attempted to assassinate him personally on several occasions, but had failed, leaving it up to Tanzim al-Jihad, supplying them with ammunition. His plan was to use his official position as commander of an Intelligence battalion in the Central Military Zone to get young Islamist officers in crucial commands and positions, this plan was started as early as 1979. As part of this plan, he forwarded Khaled Islambouli's artillery platoon to serve in the 6 October parade, and he arranged so that routine intelligence checks on the live ammunition in the platoon were not carried out.

His plan was "to kill the main leaders of the country, capture the headquarters of the army and State Security, the telephone exchange building, and of course the radio and television building, where news of the Islamic revolution would then be broadcast, unleashing—he expected—a popular uprising against secular authority all over the country." According to Reuters, Abbud and his cousin and brother-in-law Tarek al-Zumar (prominent figure of the Gama'a al-Islamiyya, imprisoned with Abbud) were Egypt's most famous political prisoners, commenting that "to many Egyptians, Zomor's name evokes a violent chapter in the history of a country that has been an incubator for Islamist militancy."

== Release ==
El Zomor was released in March 2011 after the 2011 Egyptian revolution. In a televised interview at his home on 23 March 2011, he formally apologized to the Egyptian people for the Sadat assassination, but without remorse, his reason being that it had been a mistake in providing the conditions which had brought Hosni Mubarak to power for 30 years. Zomor describes the Islamist movement he founded as the "first line of defence" of Egyptian society and although linked with violence in the past, believes that the 2011 protests showed that change can occur without war. He has said "Violence breeds violence" and that "We loved Egypt and we wanted good for it. Today, we love Egypt and we want good for it". El Zomor now states that he supports rights for all, including the Christian minority, declaring past militancy a result of state oppression.

== Writing ==
While in prison he co-authored a document with Tarek El Zomor entitled al-Badil al-Thalith bayna al-Istibdad wa-al-Istislam (The Third Alternative between Despotism and Surrender) which was published by the Egyptian newspaper al-Shuruq in late August and early September 2009. On 8 January 2011 Aboud El Zomor stated in an interview with Shorouk News that: "Sadat's assassination happened against our plans, our plans was to make a revolution in civil way without blood, but Sadat arrested every one in September 1981, so we had to move quickly and kill him, when they suggested to kill Sadat, I refused and suggested to attack prison to free the political prisoners with a plan to change Sadat without blood in 1984, but they refused so I had to listen to the majority and we killed Sadat."
