= Adalah Center for Rights and Freedoms =

Egyptian human rights organisation

- Founded: 2014
- Founders: Mohamed el-Baqer (co-founder)
- Purpose: human rights
- Region served: Egypt
- Key people: Mohamed el-Baqer, Amr Khilany
- Volunteers: 40 (2015)

Adalah Center for Rights and Freedoms (also: Adala and Liberties Centre) is an Egyptian human rights organisation created in 2014 by lawyers and students, based in Cairo.

== Founding and leadership ==
Adalah Center for Rights and Freedoms was created in 2014 by lawyers, university students and graduates to provide legal support for students and other youths.

As of September 2019, Adalah Center, based in Cairo, was led by Mohamed el-Baqer (also: Elbaker).

== Actions ==
In 2015, Adalah Center helped free Abdel Khalek, a student detained for eight months after he arrived at a metro station at the end of a political demonstration that he knew nothing about, from imprisonment. Khalek's accidental arrival at the metro station led him into charges of belonging to the Muslim Brotherhood, demonstrating illegally, killing two students and attempting to kill a third.

In February 2019, the Adalah Center, together with the Egyptian Initiative for Personal Rights (EIPR), objected to the 20 February 2019 sudden executions of nine defendants without their families being informed and allowed to visit them, in violation of Article 472 of the Egyptian penal code. None of the nine defendants had had their personal lawyers present during questioning by the prosecution or during the trial, and eight of the nine had been tortured. The Adalah Center and EIPR described the 15 known executions in February 2019 up to 21 February as "part of the increasing use of the death penalty in trials that do not meet due process and fair trial standards, and a turn to increasingly vindictive application of the death penalty."

== Repression ==
On 29 September 2019 during the 2019 Egyptian protests, Adalah Center leader Mohamed el-Baqer was arrested at the prosecutor's office where he was present as the lawyer defending Alaa Abd El-Fattah, who had just been arrested earlier that day. The State Security Prosecution case number is 1356/2019, with four charges, that appear to be: "joining an illegal organisation", "receiving foreign funding" through that illegal organisation, "spreading false news" and "misusing social media" for the spread of fake news. El-Baqer and el-Fattah are to be held for 15 days in remand. As of 1 October 2019, their locations were unknown.
