= Mohamed Ali (Egyptian contractor) =

Egyptian building contractor and political activist (born 1978)

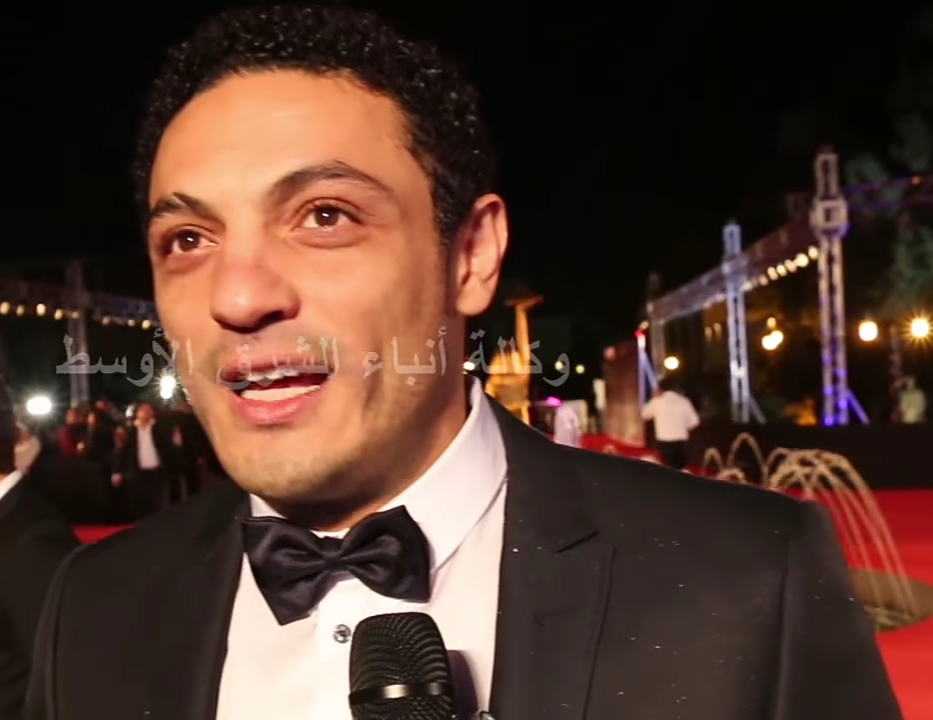
- Born: Mohammed Ali Ali Abdul Khaliq; 18 January 1978 (age 48); Giza, Egypt
- Occupations: Film actor, political activist, building contractor
- Years active: 2002 – present
- Known for: sparking off the 2019 Egyptian protests

Mohamed Ali (also: Aly; born 18 January 1978) is an Egyptian building contractor living in exile in Spain who worked for 15 years with Egyptian president Abdel Fattah el-Sisi and Sisi's colleagues building villas and a palace. In September 2019, Ali circulated videos accusing Sisi of corruption. The online circulation of videos snowballed, with others including Wael Ghonim joining in the anti-Sisi criticism. Ali called for mass anti-Sisi street protests which started on 20 September 2019 across Egypt. On 28 December 2019, Ali released the "Egyptian Consensus Document" with a list of four key principles and four key actions for replacing the Egyptian government, which he claimed represented the consensus of a wide range of the Egyptian opposition.

== Childhood and education ==
Ali was born in Giza in 1974. According to Ali, he started work at the age of 15 in his father's gold shop in order to support his parents and siblings financially. He quit two years later, and tried "maybe 13 different jobs". Ali had earlier avoided military conscription and contact with the armed forces, worrying that he would have remained at a low rank because of his low grades, a lack of formal qualifications, and "a bit of a temper".

== Contracting career ==
Ali started working as a contractor with Etisalat. He gradually came into closer and closer contract with senior army officials, including el-Sisi as defence minister in 2012. High-level military construction deals were, according to Ali, made by verbal deals, with no written contracts, and the expectation that construction would start immediately, without waiting for plans to be made.

== September 2019 videos ==
Ali was privately critical of el-Sisi. Around 2017, Kamel el-Wazir, the head of the army engineering authority, obtained an audio recording of Ali mocking el-Sisi and other generals. Ali applied for residency in Spain and settled there with his family, completing the move in August 2018 with the end of his children's school term.

Starting on 2 September 2019, Ali claimed on online social networks that he had worked in the construction industry for 15 years under army contracts, building five villas for colleagues of Sisi and a palace for Sisi in a military camp. Ali accused Sisi of wasting public funds and "[taking] low-level corruption to a new level". Ali's videos outline specific incidents and directly accuse well-known military individuals, including Major-Generals Kamel al-Wazir and Essam al-Kholy. Egyptian authorities ran a media campaign attacking Ali. According to Omar Said and Rana Mamdouh writing in Mada Masr, the governmental campaign "did not refute the substance of [Ali's] claims."

Videos by other Egyptians accusing Sisi of corruption started circulating and on 20 and 21 September, street protests started across Egypt. Ali is generally credited as the catalyst of the protests. On 20 September, Egyptian Streets described the protests as "small, scattered". On 21 September, Al Jazeera English estimated that "thousands" of protestors had participated in the previous day's protests in eight different Egyptian cities.

=== Surveillance in Spain ===
On 23 September 2019, Ali stated that "officers" had been following him in Spain for two weeks, and that he had been "hiding and running away from them". Ali stated that the officers wished to kill him and that he was too tired to "run any more". Ali stated that Spanish authorities were responsible for his safety and that if he were "killed in Spain," then that would "[prove] that Europe is a liar just like the United States and is willing to give up anybody."

== Political program ==
Following the 20 September protests, Ali called for another protest of "a million" people on Friday 27 September. He proposed the replacement of the presidential system of government by a parliamentary system. He called for fifty people to be elected in each of the governorates of Egypt and together form an assembly to discuss the creation of a new political structure for Egypt. Ali called for the new system to guarantee freedom of the press and to define the powers of the army and police.

Ali states that he represents neither the Muslim Brotherhood, nor any faction of the Egyptian Armed Forces. He said in a late October 2019 interview with Middle East Eye that in response to his videos, he had been contacted by many groups, and that the opposition to el-Sisi had become unified. He stated, "leftists, secularists, Muslim Brotherhood, liberals, all of them are now with me."

=== Egyptian Consensus Document ===
On 28 December 2019, the day before the Egyptian National Action Group (ENAG) was officially launched with the aim of replacing the Egyptian government, Ali announced the "Egyptian Consensus Document", which he claimed represented the consensus of a wide range of the Egyptian opposition.

According to Ali, the Egyptian Consensus Document includes four governing principles:

1. a civilian democratic system with the rule of law and the separation of executive, legislative and judicial powers and independence of the media;
2. equal citizenship rights for women and men and for geographical and historically marginalised groups including those of the Sinai, Nubia and Bedouins;
3. civil, political, economic, social, and cultural human rights as declared in international instruments;
4. freedom of association;

and four main aims for action:

1. "consensus on a comprehensive national project" along the lines of the Egyptian revolution of 2011: "Bread, freedom, social justice and human dignity";
2. replacement of the existing government;
3. release of all political prisoners and prisoners of conscience and transitional justice;
4. review of international agreements signed by the government in relation to transfer of Egyptian territory, natural resources and the waters of the Nile.

The document also covers the restructuring of state institutions, constitutional reform, democratic elections. Ali described the document as the result of "suggestions and inputs ... from all the entities" that he had consulted with, after spending three months trying to unite various opposition forces, including "liberals" and the Muslim Brotherhood and exiled opposition politicians.

== Media image ==
Leila Arman, writing in Mada Masr, describes Ali showing charisma in his videos, with a character "of the intrepid blue-collar badass. A savvy operator with a nose for business. A total baller who flashes cash and treats himself like a prince. An avaricious charmer." She describes his image in the videos as "not the classic poor, honest hero, nor is he the educated, middle-class striver who stands up to oppression", but instead an image "of [honour] and decency as a form of class solace, consolation, and solidarity", where the honour consists of Ali's entitlement to money that he claims is owed to him by Sisi. In his 4 September video, Ali describes his political profile, stating, "I'm not a liberal, I'm not Brotherhood, I'm not a secularist. I'm a working-class guy". Arman describes Ali's conflict with Sisi as a macho competition, "Ali plays the paragon of working-class masculinity against Sisi's more simpering version of manhood." She summarises stating that Ali "portrays a realistic dramatic character, and then he asks the audience to play the hero with him, to enter the frame. And they have obliged."

== Sentencing ==
On 16 January 2023, he was sentenced along with 22 others to life in prison in absentia over the 2019 protests.
