= National Association for Change =

Egyptian pressure group

National Association for Change Al-Gamaʿiyya al-Waṭaniyya lit-Taghyīr الجمعية الوطنية للتغيير
- Al-Jamaʿiyya al-Waṭaniyya lit-Taghyīr الجمعية الوطنية للتغيير
- Founded: February 2010
- Founder: Mohamed ElBaradei
- Type: Pressure group Political group
- Purpose: Democracy, Social justice, Free and fair elections
- Region served: Egypt
- Website: The Official website of National Association for Change

National Association for Change (Arabic: الجمعية الوطنية للتغيير) is a loose grouping of the various Egyptian of all political affiliations and religion, men and women, including representatives of civil society and young people aims to change Egypt. There was general agreement on the need to unite all the voices calling for change within a National Assembly. Mohamed ElBaradei is in-charge of the National Association for Change. The movement aims for general reforms in the political scene and achieving some of those procedures and guarantees necessitates the amendment of articles 76, 77, and 88 of the constitution as soon as possible. The banned political group the Muslim Brotherhood were represented by one of their key figures who attended the meeting however their stand in accepting a non-member of their group as a candidate is yet unclear. It is also unknown whether Amr Moussa the head of the Arab League who met with Elbaradei a day earlier will be part of the new movement. The goal of the group is to bring about political reform based on democracy and social justice.

== Platform ==
The main objectives of the association is to work towards a political system based on genuine democracy and social justice. The first step on this road is to ensure basic guarantees of free and fair elections involving all the Egyptians so that there is an equal opportunity for all the Egyptians to run and win any elections, whether legislative elections or the presidential election. The National Association for Change platform is:

1. Ending the state of emergency.
2. Complete judicial oversight of the whole election process.
3. Allowing local and international civil society groups to monitor elections.
4. Equal access to media for all candidates, particularly during presidential elections.
5. Giving Egyptians living abroad the right to vote at Egyptian embassies and consulates.
6. The right to run for president without arbitrary restrictions in accordance with Egypt's obligations under the International Covenant on Civil and Political Rights as well as limiting the president's service to two terms.
7. Voting by the National ID.

== Goals ==
1. Amending article 76 of the Constitution of Egypt states: "The People's Assembly shall nominate the President of the Republic. The nomination shall be referred to the people for a plebiscite. The nomination for the President of the Republic shall be made in the People’ Assembly upon the proposal of at least one third of its members. The candidate who obtains two-thirds of the votes of the members of the People's Assembly shall be referred to the people for a plebiscite. If he does not obtain the said majority the nomination process shall be repeated two days after the first vote. The candidate obtaining an absolute majority of the votes of the Assembly members shall be referred to the citizens for a plebiscite. The candidate shall be considered President of the Republic when he obtains an absolute majority of votes cast in the plebiscite. If the candidate does not obtain this majority, the Assembly shall propose the nomination of another candidate and the same procedure shall follow concerning his candidature and election.".
2. Amending article 77 of the Constitution of Egypt that states: "The term of the presidency shall be six Gregorian years starting from the date of the announcement of result of the plebiscite. The President of the Republic may be re-elected for other successive terms.".
3. Amending article 88 of the Constitution of Egypt that states: "The Law shall determine the conditions which members of the Assembly must fulfil as well as the rules of election and referendum, while the ballot shall be conducted under the supervision of the members of a judiciary organ.".

== Activities of the Association ==
=== In Egypt ===
==== In Dakahlia ====
Activity started People's Campaign to support ElBaradei in Dakahlia in the first leg of some political activists and members of the April 6 Youth Movement individually to receive ElBaradei at the Cairo airport late February 2010.

Began some individuals (including 3 from April 6 Youth Movement ) activity in an orderly fashion in early March, to start distributing their publication 4 thousand to support the IAEA within the Mansoura University.

With the increasing number of members of the campaign employed a human development coach to receive lectures on how to work together.

=== Outside Egypt ===
==== In the Arab States ====
===== In Kuwait =====
According to George Ishak, The online group had planned to hold its first meeting in public to launch the Kuwaiti branch of the Egyptian National Association for Change.

"There are no Egyptian elections at the moment ... and it is unacceptable for nationals to take the internal politics of their countries to the host country".

— Rawodan Al Rawodan, Kuwait's Minister of Cabinet Affairs

Kuwaiti authorities deported 17 Egyptian nationals supporting potential Egyptian presidential candidate Mohamed ElBaradei in Kuwait City. They were among 33 Egyptians in Kuwait City who belonged to a pro-ElBaradei group on the social networking site Facebook and who were detained by Kuwaiti authorities.

"These Egyptians are here to work not to form groups".

— Rawodan Al Rawodan, Kuwait's Minister of Cabinet Affairs

Kuwaiti officials said Egypt's internal politics should be kept in Egypt and not exercised abroad.

"Kuwait does not interfere into Egypt's internal affairs".

— Rawodan Al Rawodan, Kuwait's Minister of Cabinet Affairs

The Egyptian political forces to staged a protest in front of the Embassy of Kuwait in Cairo.

Gameela Ismail, an Egyptian journalist, said the demonstration comes to protest the practices of the Kuwaiti security forces and their arrest of the Egyptians because of their ad campaign to launch the Kuwaiti branch of the Egyptian National Association for Change.

"المظاهرة أيضاً هي نوع من الاحتجاج على ممارسات أجهزة الامن العربية ضد المطالبين بالحرية والديمقراطية"
"Demonstration also is a form of protest against the practices of the security forces against the Arab claimants freedom and democracy"

— Gameela Ismail

While ElBaradei described the Egyptians deportation from Kuwait "gross injustice".

==== In Europe ====
===== In England =====
A group of Egyptians who live in England supporting the peaceful change of the Constitution in Egypt towards more democratization. The group stands behind Dr Mohamed ElBaradei who champions this cause.

==== In North America ====
===== In The United States =====
Mr ElBaradei decided to visit the US during April 2010. Mr ElBaradei's visit to the United States will include meetings with Egyptians abroad to "discuss his agenda for change and answer their questions on how to move forward", said an official from Mr ElBaradei's National Association for Change.

The trip could represent an opportunity for Mr ElBaradei to focus on one of the stated goals of his National Association for Change: the enfranchisement of Egyptians abroad, many of whom have felt for years that their views on governance are neglected by the regime.

In the wake of the strong support for the National Association for Change in the United States, Egyptians living in the US formed the Egyptian Association For Change (EAC).

The EAC priorities include a free and fair elections involving all Egyptians including the Egyptian Diaspora, and guarantees of freedom of expression and peaceful political participation. To meet these objectives, the EAC mobilizes communities and individuals to advocate for constitutional reforms and the implementation of specific measures to ensure fair and transparent elections in Egypt.

While the EAC support the NAC's call for change and adopted the 7 points it has presented for reform, there is no formal relationship between the two organizations. However members of the EAC are in constant communication with the members of NAC to coordinate and synchronize positions and efforts.

On May 1, 2010, Egyptians in America voted in a mock election organized by the EAC. For the first time ever, they participated in a free and fair Egyptian electoral process that included Hamdeen Sabahi, Mohamed ElBaradei, Ayman Nour, Amr Moussa and Gamal Mubarak as candidates.

The EAC's main headquarters is in Washington, D.C., with chapters in NY/NJ, Massachusetts, North Carolina, California and Michigan.

"I think that this is an acknowledgement that Egyptians abroad are a huge number of people".

— Issandr al Amrani, an independent political analyst based in Cairo

Egyptian expatriates may have a natural affinity for Mr ElBaradei, whose global cachet resonates with expatriates who hope to see a comprehensive rethinking of Egypt's political system.

"Part of the idea behind ElBaradei is that he's a guy who has lived outside Egypt for 30 years and there's a feeling that, sure, he may not know Egypt that well, but he knows that in other places they’ve done things better than Egypt". "I think that will appeal to Egyptians living abroad who have seen societies where things work better than Egypt."

— Issandr al Amrani, an independent political analyst based in Cairo

According to figures from the 2007 US census bureau, there are nearly 200,000 people of Egyptian ancestry living in the United States.

== Figures ==
- Mohamed ElBaradei (The President of the Association)
- Hamdy Kandeel (The official spokesman)
- Hassan Nafaa (The General Coordinator of the Association and a professor of political science at Cairo University)
- Abdurrahman Yusuf al-Qaradawi (Activist and son of Qatar-based cleric Yusuf al-Qaradawi)
- Shadi Taha (Member of the High Council Ghad El-Thawra Party)
- Hamdeen Sabahi (One of the founders of Dignity Party and the editor of the party newspaper)
- Ayman Nour (A liberal Egyptian and a former candidate for the presidential elections in Egypt, founder of Hizb El-Ghad) and the President of Ghad El-Thawra Party
- Gameela Ismail (Egyptian journalist)
- George Ishak (A Leader in Kefaya Movement and its coordinator and former spokesman for the movement)
- Yehia El Gamal (A former Egyptian Minister and constitutional expert)
- Osama Al Ghazali Harb (The President of Democratic Front Party)
- Saad El-Katatny (President of the parliamentary bloc of the Muslim Brotherhood)
- Khaled Youssef
- Khaled Abol Naga (Egyptian actor)
- Ali Badrakhan (Egyptian director)
- Basma Ahmed (Egyptian actress)
- Najla Fathi (Egyptian actress)
- Yousry Nasrallah (Egyptian director)
- Alaa Al Aswany (Egyptian writer)
- Naguib Sawiris (Egyptian businessman)
- Said El Kemny (Academic Writer)

== See also ==
- April 6 Youth Movement
- Democracy in the Middle East
- 2011 Egyptian presidential election
- Kefaya
