= List of 2006 human rights incidents in Egypt =

The following is a list of notable events concerning human rights in Egypt in 2006. Although there is no single accepted definition of what constitutes a "human rights incident" in common use, those listed here are commonly called either human rights violations or advances in the recognition of human rights, or meet some of the commonly used criteria.

== January 2006 ==
- January 2: Hundreds of the Sudanese refugees that were arrested on December 30, 2005, and detained in Cairo-area detention camps were released. Hundreds more (approximately 654) remained in detention and were scheduled to be deported to Sudan on January 6, 2006.
- January 5: The deportation of 654 Sudanese refugees slated for January 6 was postponed for one week so the United Nations High Commissioner for Refugees could determine which Sudanese are legal refugees.
- January 11: 164 of the 654 Sudanese refugees slated for deportation were not deported, but were instead released.
- January 17: The US declared that it intended to postpone free trade talks with Egypt due to the December 24, 2005 court sentencing of politician Ayman Nour to five years of prison for alleged election law violations.
- January 17: Egyptian officials declared that they no longer planned on deporting any of the Sudanese refugees still in detention.
- January 18: 233 more of the Sudanese refugees slated for deportation were not deported, but were instead released. At this point, 183 of the original 654 Sudanese refugees slated for deportation remain detained.
- January 18: A mob of Muslim Egyptians attacked a mob of Coptic Christian Egyptians in the village of El Udaysaat, near Luxor. One Egyptian was killed and 12 were injured in the attack. The day before the attack, it had been discovered that the Coptic Egyptians were secretly using a guest house as a church.
- January 26: The Philippine government reported that Filipina Veronica Bangit had given accounts of being abused during her employment in Cairo as a domestic servant.
- January 28: Muslim Brotherhood members of parliament (MPs) walked out of Egypt's parliament to protest the expulsion of a fellow MP who had criticized the government for letting a French warship through the Suez Canal.
- January 28: A family court refused Hind El Hinnawy's request that the actor Ahmed El Fishawy be recognized as the father of El Hinnawy's daughter. The court ruled that while the DNA test showed El Fishawy was the father, El Hinnawy could not produce proof that he had agreed to a marriage, secret or otherwise.
- January 30: MB MPs called for a boycott against Denmark due to the Jyllands-Posten cartoons of Mohammad that appeared in that country.

== February 2006 ==
- February 3: Egyptian authorities detained U.K. politician George Galloway overnight in an airport prison cell, allegedly for reasons of national security.
- February 12: Egypt's upper house of parliament approved a two-year postponement of municipal elections, putting them off from April 2006 to April 2008. The MB MPs protested this move, which extended the terms of 4,500 officeholders.
- February 13: Hundreds of family members of the victims of the Al-Salaam ferry disaster stormed the shipping company offices in Safaga. Riot police resorted to throwing tear gas in an attempt to restore order.
- February 13: Thousands of students demonstrated at Al-Azhar University against the Jyllands-Posten cartoons.
- February 18: Three MB members were ordered to stand trial on charges of possessing weapons and provoking violence.
- February 18: Ayman Nour's lawyers filed an appeal and requested suspension of his sentence until this appeal had been ruled on.
- February 21: 400 Cairo University students, mostly from the Kefaya or El-Ghad Party groups, shouted anti-Mubarak slogans and accused his regime of corruption and rigging last year's elections. The protest coincided with Secretary Rice's visit to Cairo.
- February 28: Authorities released three British Islamic fundamentalists after they spent nearly three years in prison for membership of a banned religious party.

== March 2006 ==
- March 3: Police arrested seven MB student activists for holding a meeting, at which they were planning an anti-cartoon protest.
- March 3: Police arrested Rashad al-Bayoumi, a Cairo University professor, for affiliation with the MB.
- March 3: Egypt-based political website www.masreyat.org was shut down by state-owned internet company TE Data.
- March 5: Police arrested 12 MB members who were holding a meeting in Cairo's Zahraa el-Maadi district.
- March 6: Police arrested 5 MB members in Giza and Ismaliya on charges of plotting to "revive the group's activities".
- March 8: Police shut down the MB newspaper Afaq Arabiya (Arab Horizons) and arrested four MB members.
- March 17: Nearly 1,000 Egyptian judges held a half-hour silent protest to demonstrate for full judicial independence and against the government's order to interrogate of six of their colleagues who criticized recent elections.
- March 22: Prime Minister Nazif announced that the emergency laws would soon be replaced by new anti-terrorism laws.

== April 2006 ==
- April 3: Authorities forced several Egyptian judges to cancel meetings they had scheduled with a delegation from the NGO Human Rights Watch.
- April 9: Egyptian authorities barred jailed opposition leader Ayman Nour from sending any more articles to his party's newspaper.
- April 11: Egyptian authorities released 300 former members of the al-Gama'a al-Islamiyya (Islamic Group) militant group. 650 others from this group had been released in the previous six weeks.
- April 15: A mob of Muslim Egyptians attacked a funeral procession for Nushi Atta Girgis in the Sidi Bishr district of Alexandria. Egyptian police intervened, using tear gas to disperse the violence. 15 Egyptians were injured and 15 were arrested.
- April 15: Police arrested five MB publishers for printing material that opposed the upcoming renewal of the emergency law.
- April 16: Mobs of Muslim Egyptians and Christian Egyptians continued to attack each other in Alexandria. Over course of the weekend, 2 were killed, 40 wounded, and over 100 arrested.
- April 17: Authorities summoned judges Mahmud Mekky and Hisham al-Bastawissi to a disciplinary hearing for telling the press that they witnessed electoral fraud in the November–December parliamentary elections.
- April 17: Police detained another Muslim Egyptian who entered a Cairo church with a knife, three days after the fatal Abdel-Rizziq knife attacks in Alexandria.
- April 24: Three nearly simultaneous bombings in the Sinai resort town of Dahab kill 23.
- April 24: At a sit-in in front of Judges' Club, police arrested 15 activists who were demonstrating in solidarity with judges Mekky and Bastawissi.
- April 24: At a sit-in in front of Egyptian Judges Club, police beat Judge Mahmoud Mohammed Abdel Latif Hamza, hospitalizing him with minor injuries.
- April 24: Police arrested blogger Ahmed Droubi.
- April 26: Police arrested Al-Jazeera's Cairo bureau chief, Egyptian Hussein Abdel Ghani. Police then detained Ghani in Dahab on charges of propagating false news for his coverage of the aftermath of the April 24 bomb attacks.
- April 26: Police violently broke up a pro-judges demonstration taking place outside the Judges' Syndicate.
- April 26: Two suicide bombers attacked security personnel and foreign peacekeepers in Egypt's Sinai Peninsula, but did not cause any injuries to their targets.
- April 27: Police arrested blogger Malek Mostafa at a pro-Judges rally.
- April 27: An Egyptian court released Al-Jazeera's Cairo bureau chief Hussein Abdel Ghani on bail and charged him with propagating lies for his reporting on the April 24 Dahab bombings.
- April 27: Over the previous four days, police arrested over 51 pro-Judges demonstrators.
- April 28: Police arrested Amir Salem and Ehab el Kholy, the two main lawyers for Ayman Nour, on charges of inciting the masses and insulting the president.
- April 30: Prime Minister Nazif called for a two-year extension of the Emergency Laws in light of the April 24 Dahab bombings. The Egyptian parliament approved the extension that same day, by a 287–91 vote.

== May 2006 ==
- May 4: Police arrested 23 MB in response to the group's campaign against the Emergency Laws.
- May 6: 40 activists being held at Tora Prison launched a hunger strike in protest of being detained with criminal convicts.
- May 7: Police arrested blogger Alaa Seif al-Islam and ten other Egyptians demonstrating outside the South Cairo Court.
- May 10: Egyptian cleric Hassan Mustafa Osama Nasr, who allegedly was abducted from an Italian street by CIA officers and turned over to Egypt in 2003, made allegations that he was beaten repeatedly in the early stages of his imprisonment, including while he was in U.S. custody.
- May 11: A High Court summoned judges Mekky and Bastawisi to appear, but the two judges refused to enter the court amid such a large presence of police.
- May 11: Outside the Judges' Club, the police attacked and beat anyone who tried to demonstrate, clubbing men and women as well as at least half a dozen journalists trying to cover the events. Authorities arrested 255 demonstrators and journalists.
- May 17: The Minister of Interior issued an order banning any peaceful assemblies or demonstrations in front of the High Court Building.
- May 18: A Supreme Judicial Council disciplinary tribunal exonerated Judge Mekky on charges that he had "disparaged the Supreme Judicial Council" and "talked to the press about political affairs." But on the same grounds, the court issued a rebuke and denied a promotion to Judge Bastawisi.
- May 18: Police arrested over 300 pro-reform protesters and beat several others.
- May 18: A Cairo appeals court upheld the December 2005 conviction and 5-year prison sentence of Ayman Nour.
- May 25: 300 pro-reform judges staged a sit-in outside the High Court Building to demand the independence of Egypt's judiciary.
- May 25: Police arrested Karim el-Shaaer and Mohamed el-Sharqawi at a pro-judges demonstration outside the Journalists' Syndicate. Police allegedly tortured and sodomized Sharqawi at a Cairo police station.
- May 28: Prison medical authorities administered a medical exam on Mohamed el-Sharqawi but did not treat him for his injuries.

== June 2006 ==
- June 2: Police allegedly assaulted BBC correspondents Dina Samak and Dina Gameel while the two are reporting on a meeting of the General Assembly of the Journalists' Syndicate.
- June 3: Police seized 2,000 unlicensed DVDs of The Da Vinci Code and the Egyptian Coptic Christian church demanded the film be banned in Egypt.
- June 4: Police arrested nine senior MB members.
- June 5: The Foreign Ministry demanded that the International Republican Institute, a U.S. NGO which promotes democracy, suspend its activities in the country.
- June 7: The Egyptian Parliament postponed discussion of the judicial reforms bill.
- June 12: Police shot rubber bullets and tear gas at an MB protest that was being held in support of prominent MB member Hassan al-Hayawan, who was on trial in the town of Zagazig. Police injured ten Egyptians and briefly detained 110 others.
- June 12: A Zagazig State Security Emergency Court acquitted MB member Hassan al-Hayawan of charges of illegal possession of weapons and belonging to an illegal organization. Police detained MB member Hassan al-Hayawan immediately after he was acquitted.
- June 13: Culture Minister Farouk Hosni moved to ban the film The Da Vinci Code.
- June 16: Egyptian Organization for Human Rights released a statement opposing Culture Minister Farouk Hosni's calls to ban the film The Da Vinci Code.
- June 18: A self-professedly devout Egyptian woman in a museum destroyed three sculptures by Egyptian artist Hassan Heshmat. The attack followed a fatwā issued by the Grand Mufti of Cairo, Ali Gomaa, which banned all decorative statues of living beings.
- June 19: Police arrested 31 MB members in the North Coast town of Marsa Matrouh on charges of holding illegal meetings.
- June 21: The Yacoubian Building opened amid criticism, acclaim, and calls for censorship.
- June 22: An Egyptian court released blogger Alaa Seif al-Islam from Tora Prison. Alaa had been imprisoned since May 7.
- June 23: An Egyptian court sentenced Al-Dustour chief editor Ibrahim Issa and reporter Sahar Zaki to a year's imprisonment for insulting the president. In April, the Al-Dustour newspaper reported on a lawsuit that accused Egyptian President Mubarak of misusing public money during the privatization of state-owned companies. The man who filed the lawsuit, Said Abdullah, was also given a year's jail. The three were also fined 10,000 Egyptian pounds.
- June 23: Three hundred demonstrators at Press Syndicate called for the release of protesters that were being detained with criminals at Tora Prison.
- June 23: London-based Arab Press Freedom Watch condemned the Education Ministry's decision to fail secondary-school student Alia Farag Megahed for criticizing Mubarak and US President George W. Bush in a final-exam paper.
- June 27: An Administrative Court ruled in favor of blocking blogs that "threaten national security."
- June 30: Thousands of worshipers at the Al-Azhar Mosque protested against Israel's onslaught on the Gaza Strip.

== July 2006 ==
- July 4: A group of Coptic Christians began legal proceedings to sue Bishop Maximus I for setting up an alternative orthodox church in Egypt.
- July 5: 112 MPs called for the censorship of the film The Yacoubian Building.
- July 8: Twenty-six Egyptian newspapers did not print in a show of protest against the proposed new press law.
- July 8: Police arrested 27 MB members.
- July 9: Authorities referred 18 MB leaders for trial, among them leading politburo member Essam al-Eryan, along with hundreds of other MB members arrested during recent protests in support of judicial reform.
- July 9: Three hundred opposition journalists and supporters gathered in front of the Cairo Parliament Building to protest the proposed new press law.
- July 10: Parliament passed the new press law, which includes huge fines for journalists who insult the president. Under the legislation, journalists found to be critical of government officials are liable to receive up to five years in prison or a fine of up to US$5220, while editors can be fined up to US$3480.
- July 14: One thousand Egyptians demonstrated at al-Azhar Mosque against Israel and in solidarity with the Lebanese and Palestinian peoples.
- July 21: Three thousand Egyptians at various Alexandria mosques demonstrated against Israel and in support of Lebanon and Palestine.

== August 2006 ==
- August 13: Al Ahram reversed a previous move and unblocked employees' access to several blogs and independent political websites. The Labour Party website and several others remained blocked.
- August 14: An Egyptian court released MB politburo members Essam al-Eryan and Mohammed Morsi, both of whom had been detained since April.
- August 16: State prosecution has the order to release MB members Essam al-Eryan and Mohammed Morsi overturned. An Egyptian court then ordered Essam and Morsi to be detained for another 15 days.
- August 18: Police arrested 17 MB members in the Nile Delta town Menoufia on charges of holding a meeting aimed at reviving the banned group's activities.
- August 25: Police arrested 17 MB members, including MB secretary-general Mahmoud Ezzat and senior member Lasheen Abu Shanab.
- August 26: Police arrested four MB in the Upper Egyptian governorate of Beni Suef.

== September 2006 ==
- September 7: 70 detainees at a Damanhur prison held a hunger strike in protest of their 2004 imprisonment.
- September 17: Egypt's public prosecutor charged 14 employees of the state's railway authority with negligence. One month previous, on August 21, a rail accident in Qalyub led to the deaths of 56 Egyptians.
- September 24: Authorities banned editions of French newspaper Le Figaro and German newspaper Frankfurter Allgemeine Zeitung because of articles deemed insulting to Islam.
- September 25: An Egyptian court released prominent MB member Mohamed Al-Hayawan, who had been detained since December 2005.

== October 2006 ==
- October 13: Police arrested eight MB in the Nile Delta governorate of Monufia on charges of belonging to an illegal organization and possessing anti-government pamphlets.
- October 23: An Egyptian court ordered MB members Essam Al-Eriyan and Mohamed Morsi to be detained for another 15 days.

== November 2006 ==
- November 9: One hundred protesters outside downtown Cairo's Journalists' Syndicate demonstrated against the failure of authorities to stop the October 23 and 24 sexual harassment gangs in Tahrir Square.
- November 19: Police arrested blogger Rami Siyam in downtown Cairo. Siyam had been running his blog since May 2005 and usually posted material critical of the government.
