= Shadi Taha =

Egyptian activist (born 1978)

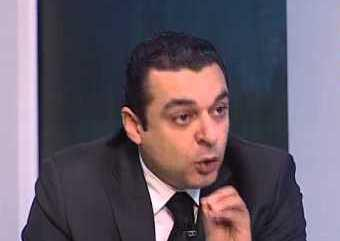

Shadi Taha شادي طه (born September 3, 1978 in Cairo) is an Egyptian politician and activist.

Taha traveled to the United States at the age of 16 to study Engineering. He became very active in politics in Washington DC where he received his education.

== Role in Arab Spring ==
Taha returned to Egypt at the end of 2006 to join the opposition forces. He became an appointed member of the high council of El-Ghad Party-Ayman Nour faction in October 2009. He was elected to a high council seat and as a vice president of the party in June 2010. Taha was in charge of the presidential campaign of Ayman Nour (The Knock on the Door Campaign) along with the political and foreign affairs of the Ghad El-Thawra Party. Taha became a board member of the National Association for Change with Mohamed ElBaradeiin February 2010, he participated in the fight for freedom leading to the Egyptian revolution in January 2011. Taha was later recognized along with 33 activists by Time Magazine in 2011, for time magazine person of the year The Protester. he contributed with his ideas about freedom and political reform in many international platforms and he wrote a daily column in rose al yusuf Newspaper from 2011 till 2013. In the beginning of 2014, Taha, announced that he will retire from politics.
