= Moussa Mostafa Moussa =

Egyptian architect and politician

Moussa Mostafa Moussa موسى مصطفى موسى
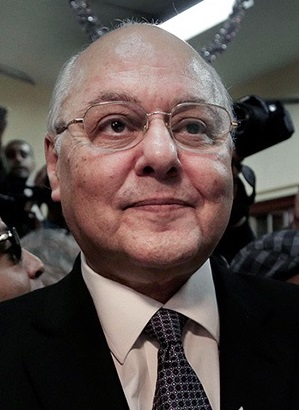

Leader of El-Ghad Party
- Incumbent
- Assumed office 2005
- Preceded by: Ayman Nour

Personal details
- Born: 13 July 1952 (age 74) Giza, Egypt
- Party: El-Ghad Party (2005–present)
- Other political affiliations: New Wafd Party (until 2005)
- Education: École nationale supérieure d'architecture de Versailles

Moussa Mostafa Moussa (Arabic: موسى مصطفى موسى; born 13 July 1952) is an Egyptian architect and politician. He became the leader of El-Ghad Party in 2005 and was a candidate in the 2018 Egyptian presidential election.

== Early life ==
Moussa was born in Giza. He started his studies in Egypt but, on his father's advice, completed them in France, earning a master's degree in architecture from École nationale supérieure d'architecture de Versailles. He was a member of the youth organisation of the New Wafd Party and then the party itself.

== Career ==
He joined El-Ghad Party in 2005, becoming vice-chairman. After its leader Ayman Nour was sentenced to five years in jail, El-Ghad split into two factions, led respectively by Moussa and Gameela Ismail, Nour's wife at the time. They fought to be recognized as successors and both used the party's name and symbols. The dispute was resolved in May 2011 in favour of Moussa's group. He unsuccessfully ran for the Egyptian House of Representatives where he would have represented the Southern Giza constituency in the 2010 elections. He also led the party during the 2011–12 election.

Moussa was originally a supporter of Abdel Fattah el-Sisi, incumbent President of Egypt. He played a role in collecting pledges for Sisi until 20 January 2018, when he announced running for office. He claimed to have support from 26 members of parliament and 47,000 signatures. He submitted all the documents and signatures to the National Election Authority the next day at 1:45pm, just 15 minutes before the deadline. He claims not to be a phony candidate in spite of supporting Sisi's candidacy. Because other potential candidates either declined to start or were forced out by el-Sisi's repression campaign, Moussa was the only candidate running apart from Sisi.

== Personal life ==
He is married and has one son and two daughters. His brother Ali Moussa was a chief of Egypt's Chamber of Commerce.
