= Ad-Dustour =

Ad-Dustour or Al-Dustour (Arabic: الدستور "The Constitution") may refer to:

- Al-Dustour (Egypt), an Egyptian newspaper
- Ad-Dustour (Jordan), a Jordanian newspaper
