= Taghrid Qindil =

Jordanian short story writer (born 1967)

Taghrid Qindil (born 1967) is a Jordanian short story writer.

Born in Irbid, Qindil possesses a bachelor's degree in English literature. She received the Prize for Young Writers from the League of Jordanian Writers in 1985–1986; in 1987 she received the al-Dustur Cultural Supplement Prize. Two volumes of her short stories had been published as of 1999.
