= Ghad El-Thawra Party =

Political party in Egypt

Ghad El-Thawra Party Hizb Ghad El-Thawra حزب غد الثورة
- Chairperson: Ayman Nour
- Founder: Ayman Nour
- Founded: 2011
- Split from: El-Ghad Party
- Merged into: Congress Party
- Headquarters: Cairo
- Ideology: Secularism; Liberalism; Reformism; Liberal democracy
- Political position: Centre
- International affiliation: Liberal International (observer)
- Slogan: Be with us, you are right
- House of Representatives: 0 / 568

Website
- ghadelthawra.party

Ghad El-Thawra Party (Arabic: حزب غد الثورة Ḥizb Ghad el-Thawra; "Revolution's Tomorrow Party"), is an Egyptian political party that was approved on 9 October 2011. Headed by Ayman Nour, it was a split of the El-Ghad Party. Nevertheless, the "Revolution's Tomorrow Party" still uses the name El-Ghad (The Tomorrow Party) on its website and communiques.

The Ghad El-Thawra Party was contesting the 2011–12 Egyptian parliamentary election with fifteen candidates (thirteen for the lower house and two for the upper) as part of the Muslim Brotherhood's Freedom and Justice Party-led Democratic Alliance for Egypt.

== Background ==
Ayman Nour left the New Wafd Party in 2001, and established El-Ghad Party. The party was legalized in 2004. After facing president Hosni Mubarak in the 2005 Egyptian presidential election, Nour was sentenced to five years in jail on forgery charges.

In 2005, just before Nour being sentenced, the El-Ghad Party split in two factions. One was headed by Moussa Moustafa Moussa, the other by Nour's (now former) wife Gameela Ismail. Legal battle ensued between both factions, both claiming legitimacy and simultaneously using the party name and insignia. The final court ruling in May 2011 was in favor of Moussa. Ayman Nour hence filed for a new party, "Ghad El-Thawra Party" or "Revolution's Tomorrow Party", which was approved on 9 October 2011.

The Ghad El-Thawra party supported the 2011 Egyptian revolution. Nour was reportedly close to the Muslim Brotherhood; the headquarters of the party were burned down in March 2013.

== Moving activity abroad ==
On 18 January 2021 Ghad El-Thawra Party announced in a press conference freezing the activities of the party in Egypt and moving its activities abroad. The vice president of Ghad El-Thawra Party Mahmoud Refaat detailed that act as non-dissolve the party neither bringing abroad as hi power on Egypt, while it's a need because of the current situation in Egypt.

== Electoral history ==
=== People's Assembly elections ===
Election	Seats	+/–
2011–12 (as part of Democratic Alliance for Egypt)	2 / 596	▲2

== Platform ==
The party platform called for:

- Political and economic reform.
- Paying a special care for the handicapped.
- Combating drug addiction.
- Solving the water crisis.

== Name confusion ==
Ayman Nour has been tightly associated with both the El-Ghad name and party, even being accused of internal monopoly by other party members. Since both Nour and Moussa fractions were using (and still are) the same name and insignia (e.g.: Ghad El-Thawra website), it was often difficult to tell them apart. For instance, Liberal International lists El-Ghad, specifying its leader as Ayman Nour, as an observer member. Many poll and media outlets used the term "El-Ghad" without specifying which party or faction they are referring to, although they often meant the Ayman Nour Ghad El-Thawra faction.

== See also ==
- El-Ghad Party
- Liberalism in Egypt
- Kefaya
- 2011 Egyptian protests
- April 6 Youth Movement
- National Association for Change
