= Ibrahim Eissa =

Egyptian journalist and TV personality

- إبراهيم عيسى
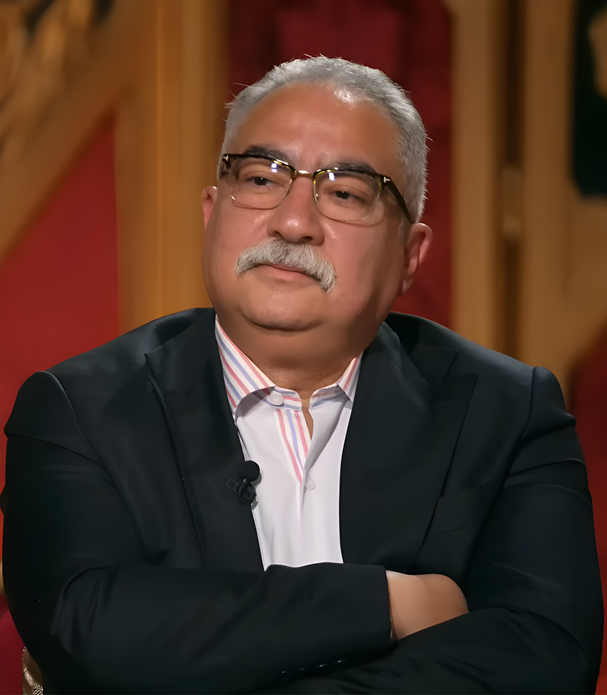
- Born: November 9, 1965 (age 60); Quesna, Monufia Governorate, Egypt
- Education: Cairo University
- Employer: Al Tahrir Newspaper

Ibrahim Eissa (Egyptian Arabic: إبراهيم عيسى; born 9 November 1965) is an Egyptian journalist and TV personality best known for co-founding the popular Egyptian weekly Al-Dustour. He is currently editor-in-chief of Al Tahrir, which he co-founded in July 2011.

== Early life and education ==
Ibrahim Eissa was born in November 1965 in Quesna in the Monufia Governorate in Egypt. His father was an Arabic teacher. When he was 11, he published his first magazine, Al Haqiqa, which he arranged to print himself and distributed by hand to local schools and newsstands. When he was 17, during his first year at the Cairo University School of Journalism, Eissa began working for the magazine Rose al-Yūsuf, becoming its youngest editorial secretary. Although a state-run magazine, it was reputed for its openness to normally taboo topics as well as its leftist and nationalist opposition to the Muslim Brotherhood and the Gamaa Islamiyya. However, within a year of his refusal to support the 1990 Iraqi invasion, he was forced to resign from his political editorship and assume the literary editor position.

== Career ==
=== Al-Dustour and Ala El- Qahwa ===
A private publisher named Essam Fahmi Ismail approached Eissa's coworker Adel Hammouda about starting a journalistic enterprise of some kind but was rebuffed. He then approached Eissa and the two created the weekly newspaper Al-Dustour under a foreign license in 1995. The paper took a critical approach towards the Egyptian regime that was unique at the time, particularly in its focus on government corruption, quality of governance, and Egypt's relationship with Israel. The paper contained contributions from all ends of the political and religious spectrums, including Marxists, Nationalists, and Nasserists. As editor-in-chief, Ibrahim Eissa was a big part of the controversy that arose as a result. The paper was also known for its colloquial, provocative content and illustrated cartoons. The paper was very influential in the evolution of the Egyptian press—it became popular for other papers to "dustourize" their pieces (the word "dustourize" itself was used) by taking a stronger stance. Its circulation reached around 150,000 copies per week. Eissa stated that the reason for its popularity was how the paper spoke to its core audience, the youth.

The paper was shut down in February 1998 after it published a death threat from the Gamaa Islamiyya against three Coptic businessmen. Prior to its shutdown, three issues had been confiscated for their controversial nature. According to Eissa, the paper was shut down after a personal appeal to President Hosni Mubarak by Naguib Sawiris, who complained about the paper's publication of the death threat.

After Al-Dustour was shut down, Eissa made nine attempts to open another newspaper, political or cultural publication under either party or foreign licenses. All of these attempts were rejected. He tried to write under a pseudonym for the People's Democratic Party, but his efforts were hindered by government intervention. Nevertheless, he slowly reintroduced himself as a writer in the non-political arena.

When Dream TV was launched in 2001, Eissa was called on to host the current affairs show, Aala Al Qahwa (At the Cafe). By 2003, the network was forced to drop Eissa due to the controversial nature of his program. During this period, Eissa also wrote the first of a number of novels, entitled Maqtal Al Rajul Al Kabeer (The Assassination of the Big Man). None of his novels were received well by critics, and this one in particular was banned and confiscated by the government.

=== Reopening of Al-Dustour and trials ===
In 2004, Eissa was offered two jobs. The first was as editor-in-chief of the El-Ghad Party's newspaper. Ayman Nour, the party's leader at that time, wanted to hire Eissa because his popularity would build a larger base for the party. At the same time, he was approached by Essam Fahmi about restarting Al-Dustour. Although Eissa chose to work with the El-Ghad Party, the move was blocked when the security services made Mostafa Moussa fire Eissa in 2005 while Ayman Nour was in prison. Eissa fell back on his second choice and became editor in chief at Al-Dustour. In 2005, he took over Fahmi's other newspaper, Sawt Al-Umma, and made regular appearances on the TV show Min Awul Sadr.

In June 2006, Eissa was convicted of defaming Hosni Mubarak in a piece that described a lawyer's attempt to take the president and his family to court for corruption. He was sentenced to a year in prison, alongside his lawyer Said Abdullah. The ruling was overturned in February 2007, and Eissa instead had to pay a $3,950 fine. The suit was filed on behalf of Mubarak by a private citizen and proceeded quickly, in contravention of Egyptian judicial norms.

On 5 December 2007, Eissa faced trial in Algalaa' Court after he published an article about Mubarak's health problems. On 31 March 2008, he was found guilty of damaging the national economy after the Central Bank testified that $350 million in investments left Egypt in the days after the article was published. On 28 September 2008, the Boulak Abul Ela Appeals Court upheld the guilty verdict, but reduced Eissa's sentence to two months in prison, charging Eissa with reporting and publishing false information. The appeal was originally brought by state security prosecutors, who argued that the six-month term was too light. Eissa was quoted as saying, "This sentence opens the gates of hell for the Egyptian press." NGOs such as Amnesty International and the Arabic Network for Human Rights Information denounced the verdict. On 8 October 2008, Eissa's sentence was pardoned by Mubarak.

On 5 October 2010, Ibrahim Eissa was fired from his position at Al-Dustour after the paper was purchased by Sayyid Badawi, a businessman and member of the Egyptian Wafd Party. According to Eissa, Badawi's takeover of the paper was engineered specifically to stop him from writing. The immediate reason was his desire to publish a piece by Mohamed El Baradei who opposed President Mubarak and was a potential presidential candidate. Earlier in the same year, Eissa was fired from his position as host of Baladna bel Masry, an ONTV political talk show.

=== Post-Mubarak media projects ===
Since the 2011 Egyptian Revolution, Eissa has been involved with two media projects. The first is the launch of a private satellite television channel titled Al Tahrir TV Channel in February 2011, and the second is the launch of a daily newspaper, Al Tahrir, in July 2011. Though carrying the same name, the television channel and the newspaper are separate media projects.

==== El Tahrir TV channel ====
Al Tahrir TV Channel was the first television channel in Egypt to be launched following the resignation of Mubarak. It was launched in February 2011. The channel's slogan is "The People Want to Liberate the Minds". Ibrahim was one of three owners of the channel, along with Ahmed Abu-Haiba and Mohamed Morad. However, in October 2011, following serious financial challenges, Eissa sold his share of the channel to two businessmen who co-owned Eissa's share, Nabil Kamel and Dr. Said Tawfiq. Ibrahim Eissa continued working with the channel, serving as a television reporter for the show Fil Midan. However, in February 2012 he quit the show and is now no longer associated with the channel.

In December 2011, Tawfiq sold his share to businessman Suleiman Amer, who now owns 84% of the channel's shares. The channel was widely criticized by its top television reporters, including Eissa, out of speculation that the new channel's administration was serving the interests of the Egyptian state.

==== El Tahrir newspaper ====
The newspaper Al Tahrir was launched in July 2011. It was the second to be launched following Mubarak's resignation, following the publication of the previously weekly periodical Youm 7. Like Al Tahrir TV, the newspaper is named after Tahrir Square. The ownership of the newspaper is divided between Eissa and publisher Ibrahim al-Moalem, who also works with another daily independent newspaper, Al-Shorouk, as its chairperson. Eissa is currently the editor-in-chief of the newspaper. When the newspaper was first launched, it had the same tone as Eissa's previous newspaper Al-Dustour, which was dominated by satire and opinion pieces. The newspapers executive editor claimed that in addition to news reporting, Al Tahrir aimed to provide insights and analysis of news events. The newspaper has also sought to redeem the importance of print media, particularly in the eyes of the youth who have resorted to new social media for their information.

=== Post-Mubarak death threats ===
In December 2011, sources indicated that Eissa and other prominent individuals working in various media outlets had received death threats because of the controversial stories they covered.

== Mubarak trial testimony ==
Eissa has been criticized by activists for shifting his testimony during Mubarak's 2011 trial and 2014 retrial. Eissa originally accused police forces of shooting protesters, but said in the retrial he did not witness shootings. He also stated during the retrial that Mubarak was a patriotic president who neither ordered the use of force against protesters nor cutting off phone and internet lines, and only called on security authorities to use necessary measures to contain chaos.

== Awards ==
In 2008, Eissa was given the Gebran Tueni Award in Lebanon. In March 2011, Eissa was awarded an Index on Censorship's 2010 Freedom of Expression Award. The award has been described as commemorating the many who put their lives at risk for their right to express their opinions. Eissa was characterized as a "one-man barometer of Egypt's struggle for political and civic freedom". He dedicated the award to Tahrir Square.

In April 2011, Eissa was also awarded the International Journalist of the Year 2010 award by a British institution called the Society of Editors. This award similarly recognized journalists' commitment to the freedom of expression and the press and bravery against threats. Eissa was specifically awarded as a result of his insistence on democracy, and as a result of his journalistic position and opinions against Mubarak's toppled regime.

His novel, Our Master, was shortlisted for the International Prize for Arabic Fiction in 2013.
