= 2018 Egyptian presidential election =

- 26–28 March 2018
- Registered: 59,078,138
- Turnout: 41.05% (▼6.45pp)
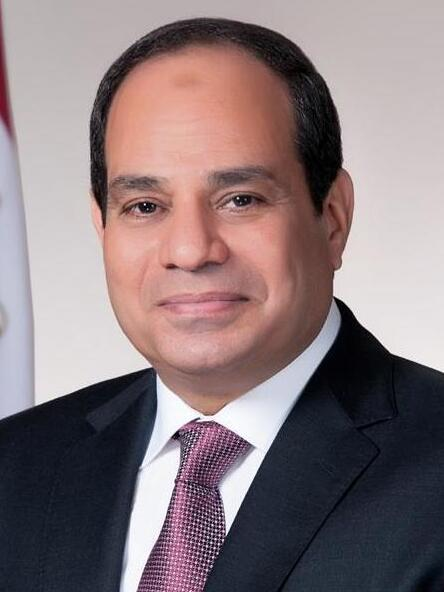

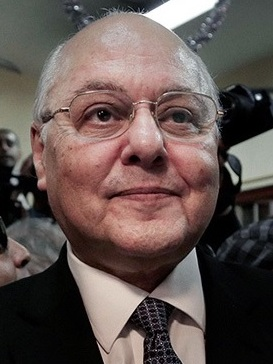
Candidate	Abdel Fattah el-Sisi	Moussa Mostafa Moussa
Party	Independent	El-Ghad Party
Popular vote	21,835,387	656,534
Percentage	97.08%	2.92%
President before election
Abdel Fattah el-Sisi
Independent
Elected President
Abdel Fattah el-Sisi
Independent

Presidential elections were held in Egypt between 26 and 28 March 2018, though Egyptians abroad voted from 16 to 18 March 2018. On 19 January, incumbent President Abdel Fattah el-Sisi formally announced he would run for a second and final term. El-Sisi won the election with 97%, according to the official results. A runoff would have taken place 19 to 21 April outside the country and 24 to 26 April within the country if no candidate had reached 50% of the vote. The election had a turnout of roughly 41%, lower than the 2014 election's 47%. A 2019 constitutional change allowed El-Sisi to remain in power until 2030 instead of 2022.

The elections were conducted amid a repression campaign by incumbent President el-Sisi. In the face of this repression, all opposition candidates pulled out of the election. The only approved challenger to Sisi was another pro-government politician, Moussa Mostafa Moussa. Fourteen human rights groups dismissed the poll as "farcical." They said the authorities had "trampled over even the minimum requirements for free and fair elections", stifling basic freedoms and eliminating key challengers.

== Electoral system ==
The president of Egypt is elected using the two-round system. If only one person runs for the presidency, they can be elected with a yes vote from five percent of eligible voters.

== Boycotts ==
The Civil Democratic Movement announced on 30 January 2018 that it would boycott the vote.

== Candidates ==
=== Abdel Fattah el-Sisi ===
Abdel Fattah el-Sisi was the incumbent president of Egypt. After leading the 2013 military coup that overthrew Egypt's first democratically elected president, el-Sisi retired from his military career in 2014 and subsequently won that year's presidential election. In the announcement of his candidacy, he stated, "There are people I know who are corrupt, I will not allow them to come near this chair.” President Sisi received the endorsement of 464 members of Egyptian Parliament, approximately two thirds of the body.

=== Moussa Mostafa Moussa ===
El-Ghad Party chairman Moussa Mostafa Moussa, a pro-Sisi politician who had an active role in collecting nomination pledges for Sisi's second term until 20 January, announced that he found endorsements from 26 members of parliament, as well as 47,000 signatures from the public, although he declared his intention to run just a day before the deadline of the elections commission. Moussa submitted his nomination pledges and official paperwork to the commission just 15 minutes before the deadline. In an interview with Egypt Today, Moussa said he was not a "phony" candidate, and that he had "a vision that can be achieved by being part of the system".

== Declined candidates ==
- Ahmed Shafik, former Egyptian prime minister and leader of the Egyptian Patriotic Movement and 2012 presidential candidate.
- Sami Hafez Anan, former Chief of the General Staff of the Armed Forces, officially announced his candidacy in a Facebook video on 19 January 2018. He was arrested on 23 January after being accused by the Egyptian Armed Forces of forging his release from military service. It is illegal in Egypt for active military personnel to participate in politics. Anan retired from military service in 2012 after being removed by then-president Mohamed Morsi. The Defense Ministry claims that it has documentation that he is still a reserve member of the military. Anan's campaign manager claimed in a television interview that Anan had submitted the paperwork to request a discharge from his reserve status, and said Anan had followed the precedent set by President Sisi in his 2014 run. According to leader of campaign of Anan Mahmoud Refaat, Anan was declined of elections despite respecting all procedures required by the law.

== Withdrawn candidates ==
- Khaled Ali, a human rights lawyer and former head of the Egyptian Center for Economic and Social Rights (ECESR) and 2012 presidential candidate, announced his intention to run for the presidency on 6 November 2017. Ali withdrew on 24 January 2018 after the arrest of another candidate, Sami Anan. He had also been convicted of making "an obscene gesture" outside a courthouse and was in the appeal process.
- El-Sayyid el-Badawi, chairman of the New Wafd Party.
- Mortada Mansour, chairman of Zamalek Sporting Club.
- Mohamed Anwar Esmat Sadat, expelled MP, chairman of the Reform and Development Party, former chairman of the Egyptian House of Representatives' Human Rights Committee and nephew of Anwar Sadat.

== Conduct ==
Supporters of former presidential candidates Sami Hafez Anan and Khaled Ali faced difficulties in registering pledges for them. It was reported that el-Sisi exerted pressure on former presidential candidates so that they would not run against him.

According to Foreign Policy, "the March vote will in no way confirm President Abdel Fattah al-Sisi's popularity among the Egyptian people. This election campaign is merely an extension of the internal power struggle among the military and the regime's security services, and it has nothing to do with democratic mechanisms worthy of the name."

== Results ==
Following the elections, it was reported that large number of spoilt ballot papers, possibly more than a million, involved voters crossing out both names and writing that of football player Mohamed Salah.

Candidate	Party	Votes	%
Abdel Fattah el-Sisi	Independent	21,835,387	97.08
Moussa Mostafa Moussa	El-Ghad Party	656,534	2.92
Total		22,491,921	100.00
Valid votes		22,491,921	92.73
Invalid/blank votes		1,762,231	7.27
Total votes		24,254,152	100.00
Registered voters/turnout		59,078,138	41.05
Source: HEC
