= Mahmoud Refaat =

Belgian politician

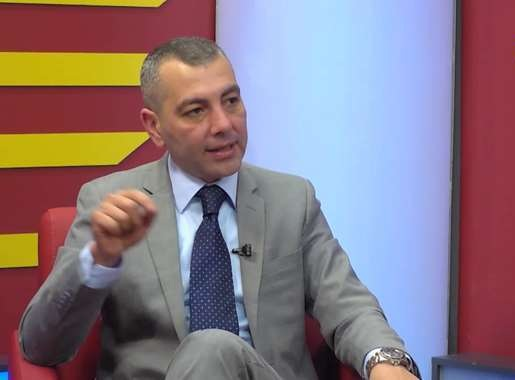
- Mahmoud Refaat
- Born: April 25, 1978 (age 48); Cairo, Egypt
- Citizenship: French, Belgian, Egyptian
- Education: Paris University, Toulouse Capitole University (France); Ain Shams University (Egypt)
- Occupations: International Lawyer, Foreign policy advisor
- Known for: Politician, Expert in international relations and Writer
- Website: www.refaat.info

Mahmoud Refaat (Arabic: محمود رفعت, romanized: Mahmood Rifaat; born April 25, 1978) is an international relations expert (president of the European Institute for International Law and International Relations), writer, and lawyer.

Refaat was born in Cairo in Egypt. He managed the presidential campaign of former Egyptian Army Chief of Staff Lieutenant General Sami Anan during 2018 Egyptian presidential election. He also established the International Action Group for Peace in Libya and the Humanitarian Action Group for Yemen.

== Biography ==
Refaat is a French-Belgian citizen of Egyptian origin. He was born in Cairo, Egypt. Refaat studied law and international relations at Ain Shams University in Egypt, University of Paris, University of Paris Pantheon Assas and Toulouse Capitole University in France.

In January 2018, Mahmoud Refaat managed the presidential campaign of former Egyptian Army Chief of Staff Lieutenant General Sami Anan from abroad.

On May 12, 2018, Mahmoud Refaat with Libyan Prime Minister founded the International Action Group for Peace in Libya and assumed the position of General Coordinator. The group aims to put an end to civil war in Libya, and to work with the international community to establish a background of state in era of post Gadafi.

In March 2019, Refaat launched the Humanitarian Action Group for Yemen.

In 2022, Refaat launched the World Forum on Peace and Security in Stockholm, Sweden and Washington DC, US with former US Representative James Bacchus and the former member of the European Parliament Klaus Buchner. The forum focuses on issues such as world peace and international security, particularly in conflict areas.

== Nomination for the Nobel Peace Prize ==
Mahmoud Refaat was nominated for the Nobel Peace Prize twice by a group of university professors from different countries as well as members of the European Parliament, including Klaus Buchner for his efforts for peace in Yemen, Libya, and Syria.

In 2018, Refaat was nominated for the Nobel Peace Prize by a group of members of the European Parliament, led by Klaus Buchner, for his work assisting victims of conflicts in Syria, Yemen, and Libya, as well as his involvement in promoting the role of international law in Libya.

In 2019, Refaat was nominated for the Nobel Peace Prize for the second time by former Libyan Prime Minister Omar al-Hassani, along with several university professors from various countries, for his efforts to achieve peace in Libya and his role in the political and legal fields, as well as at the international level, to end the armed conflict.

== Selected publications ==
Some of his publications are:

- Islamic Terrorism, Myth and Reality, 2021, ISBN 9798472678001.
- Islamophobia: Roots, Consequences and Solutions, 2021, ISBN 9798472245562.
- International Law and Global Governance, 2019, ISBN 9798498777597.
- Role of International Law in International Politics, 2017, ISBN 9798493243936.
- The Role of the International Criminal Court in the International Peace, 2013, ISBN 9798512777138.
- International Economic Sanctions in International law and In Practice, 2014, ISBN 9798483893417.
- Ethics and Religion in International Relations – Usage and Investment, 2012, ISBN 9798781283668.
- The Complementarity of National and International Criminal Legal Systems, 2011, ISBN 9798512770689.
