= European Institute for International Law and International Relations =

Independent policy institute in Paris

- Abbreviation: EIIR
- Formation: 2009; 16 years ago
- Type: International Relations policy institute
- Purpose: Aims at conducting peace research also intended to function as a platform to promote non-violent conflict resolution in different areas of the world.
- Headquarters: Paris, Brussels
- Fields: International Law; International Relations; International conflicts; Strategic Studies; Military balance
- President: Mahmoud Refaat
- Website: www.eiir.eu

The European Institute for International Law and International Relations (EIIR) in French (Institut européen pour le Droit international et les Relations internationales) is an independent policy institute and N.P. organisation based in Paris, France and Stockholm, Sweden. The Institute represents a center dedicated to studies and research on international law, international relations, strategic topics and social life. The EIIR is a laboratory for strategic studies to combine both legal and strategic studies in the same discussion. The institute provides a forum in Europe, annually hosting events, debates, and negotiations.

== Overview ==
The European Institute for International Law and International Relations (EIIR) is an independent, international not-for-profit think tank dedicated to managing risk and building resilience to promote peace, security, and sustainable development.

The EIIR was founded in 2009 by Mahmoud Refaat in Paris. Since 2013, it has additional offices in Brussels, Belgium and Geneva, Switzerland, serving as a think tank and policy institute. The institute is administrated by members of boards consisting of ex-politicians, ambassadors and professors of political science, international law, international relations, economy, etc.

The main focuses of the EIIR are international law, international relations, human rights, international security, international conflict and military balance

== Scope of work ==
The European Institute for International Law and International Relations (EIIR) is dedicated to managing risk and building resilience in support of initiatives designed to promote peace, security, and sustainable development through a mix of policy research, strategic analysis, publishing, and convening. With staff from more than twenty countries and a broad range of academic fields, EIIR has offices facing European Union headquarters in Brussels and others in Paris and Geneva.

EIIR achieves physical activities in areas of conflict in different parts of the world to put an end to civil conflicts, war and to sue war criminals in front of international justice. In recent years the work of the institute has been focused on peace and developments in the Middle East and North Africa region, the development of an EU-Foreign and Security Policy, International Security, also – on a smaller range – on specific topics in Latin America and Africa.

== Distinguished fellows ==
EIIR’s distinguished fellows represent a diverse mix of international experts and high-ranking diplomats. They include:

Abdallah Alashaal, Egypt
Jason Altmire, United States
James Bacchus, United States
Klaus Buchner, Germany
Linnéa Engström, Sweden
Angelika Mlinar, Austria, Slovenia
Jiri Tomas Payne, Czech Republic
Paul Ruebig, Austria
Csaba Sógor, Romania

== Practice areas ==
- International relations
- International law
- Human rights
- International security
- International conflict
- Military

== Offices ==
- Paris
- Stockholm
- Geneva
