= Al Tahrir (newspaper) =

Daily newspaper in Egypt (2011–2015)

- Type: Daily newspaper
- Founders: Ibrahim El Moellam; Ibrahim Eisaa
- Editor-in-chief: Ibrahim Eissa
- Founded: 1 July 2011
- Ceased publication: September 2015
- Language: Classical Arabic
- Headquarters: Cairo
- Country: Egypt

Al Tahrir (Arabic: التحرير, lit. 'The Liberation') was a privately owned classical Arabic 18-page daily published in Cairo, Egypt. It was named after the Tahrir Square in Cairo which witnessed demonstrations in the 2011 protests. The daily was the second publication launched after "the revolution". The paper's print edition was closed in September 2015, and it became an online-publication. It ceased publication in August 2019.

== History and ownership ==
The daily was launched in July 2011 following the ouster of Hosni Mubarak and was named after the Tahrir Square. It is the second daily started during the Egyptian Revolution of 2011.

One of its owners and board chairman was Ibrahim El Moellam, who also owns the independent Al Shorouk daily. Ibrahim Eissa was another cofounder and editor-in-chief of the daily.

Al Tahrir became an online-only publication in September 2015. It permanently folded in August 2019.

== Content and editors ==
Al Tahrir was an 18-page daily. In July 2011, Ibrahim Mansour, the executive editor of the daily, argued that it primarily targets young readers, who "lost faith in the print media because it served the regime." Significant editors of the daily included Ibrahim Mansour, Belal Fadl, Omar Taher and Ahmed Esseily. Mahmoud Salem, who was a leading novelist, published weekly articles in the daily, the last of which contained criticisms over the Muslim Brotherhood in Egypt.

Following the US President Barack Obama's description of the July 2013 events in Egypt as a "coup" the daily published an English message on its front page on 4 July, saying "It's a revolution .. not a coup."

== Political approach ==
The first issue of the daily reported "it will be a replica of Al Dostour in terms of its opinionated content and sarcastic flourishes." The initial approach of the paper was "to represent the voice of the January 25 Revolution," which opposed the Mubarak regime. It tries to challenge authoritarianism and corruption and all the red lines Egypt's rulers try to draw around a free press. Following the election of Abdel Fattah Sisi as president of Egypt the headline of the paper was "Egypt is in joy".

=== Controversy ===
In August 2012, Al Tahrir and two other dailies, Al-Masry Al-Youm and Al Watan, blanked their columns, protesting the appointment of editors-in-chief by the Egyptian Shura Council. On 4 December 2012, Al Tahrir together with eleven papers and five TV channels went on strike for one day, protesting the draft constitution.
