= Manuela Ripa =

German lawyer and politician

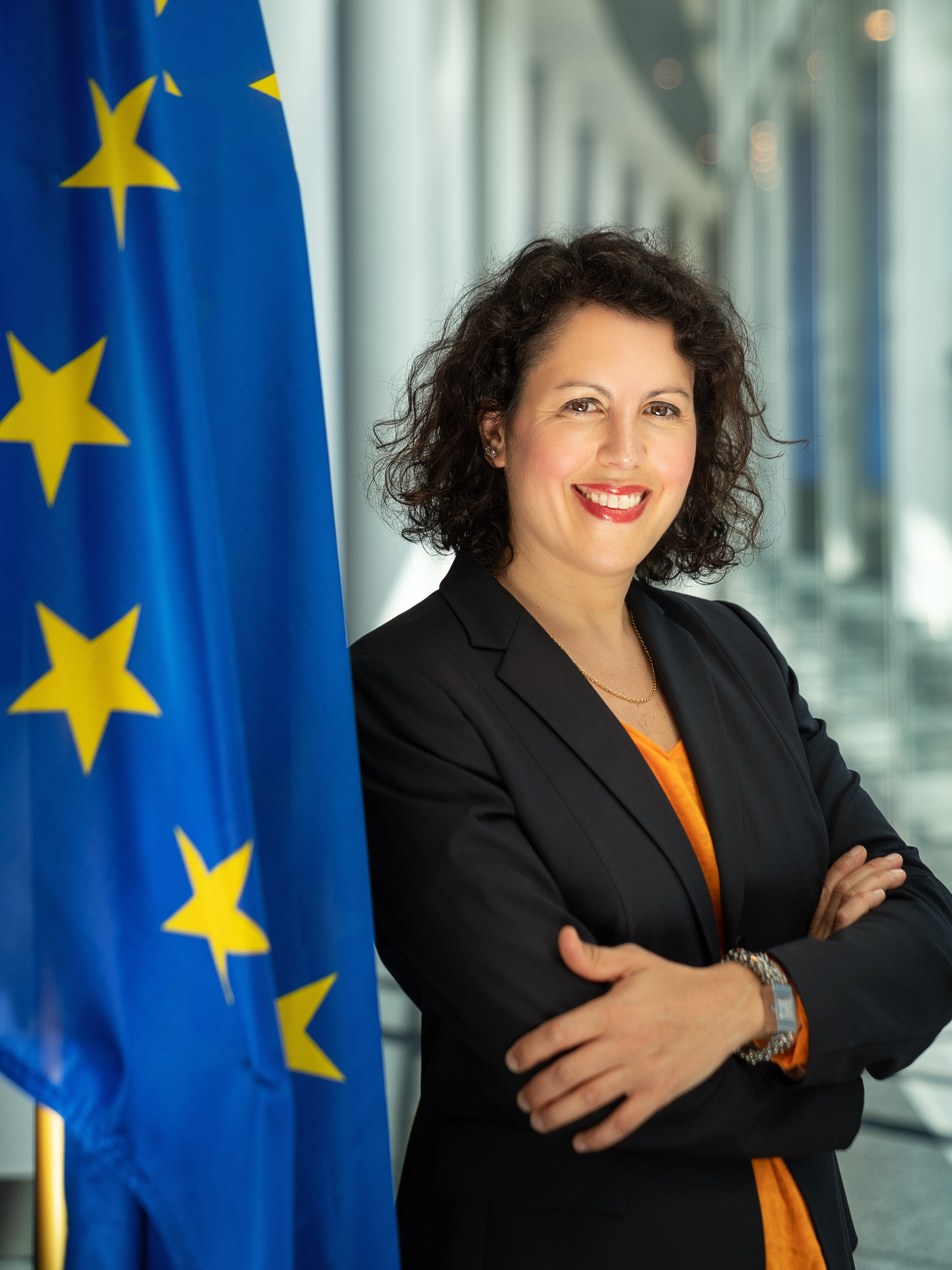

Member of the European Parliament
- Incumbent
- Assumed office 16 July 2020
- Preceded by: Klaus Buchner

Personal details
- Born: 1976 (age 49–50) Saarbrücken, Saarland, Germany
- Party: Ecological-Democratic Party

Manuela Magda Franca Maria Ripa (born 1976) is a German lawyer and politician of the Ecological-Democratic Party, ÖDP. Since 16 July 2020, she has been a member of the European Parliament. After her reelection in 2024 she switched from the group of the Greens–European Free Alliance to that of the European People's Party Group.

== Biography ==
=== Studies and career ===
Ripa was born and grew up in Saarbrücken and received her high-school-diploma from the Grammar School in Rotenbühl. Following a one-year language study in Oxford and London, she studied law at Saarland University, where she completed her first state examination in law. She completed her legal clerkship as well as her second state examination in law in North Rhine-Westphalia. During her legal clerkship, she held positions at the state chancellery of North Rhine-Westphalia in Düsseldorf in the department for international relations as well as at the European Commission in Brussels in the Directorate-General for External Relations, Multilateral Relations and Human Rights. She gained practical experience also at the Policy Planning Staff of the German Foreign Office and the European Court of Justice in Luxembourg. From 2006 to 2009 she worked as an assistant at the European Parliament, responsible for the Committee on Agriculture and Rural Development and the Committee on Budgetary Control. In 2010, she joined the Federal Ministry of Health (Germany) as the personal assistant to the minister. From 2011 to 2020, she was an advisor at the Representation of the German State of Saarland to the European Union, working on the topics of Energy, Agriculture, Environment, Health and Regional Development. At the 2019 European Parliament election, she ran in second place of the list of the Ecological-Democratic Party (ÖDP).

=== Member of the European Parliament ===
On July 16, 2020, Ripa succeeded the outgoing MEP Klaus Buchner in the group of the Greens–European Free Alliance as a Member of the European Parliament. In that legislative period she has been a member in the committee on industry, research and energy, the special committee on beating cancer, and the intergroup on animal welfare and conservation of animals. Moreover, she has been a substitute member in the committee on international trade and the committee on environment, public health and food safety. In addition to this, she is a substitute member in the delegations for relations with Iran and India. She has also been a member of SEDE.

On October 30, 2023, Ripa was nominated as the lead candidate of the ÖDP for the 2024 European elections at an election meeting in Würzburg. In the European elections on June 9, 2024, the ÖDP achieved 0.6% and thus one seat. Ripa was re-elected.

Shortly after the election, she switched to the European People's Party Group .

Ripa is now member in the committee on culture and education and the delegation for relations with Mercosur. She is also a substitute member in the committee on the environment, public health and food safety, the committee on women’s rights and gender equality, the subcommittee on public health and the delegation to the CARIFORUM-EU parliamentary committee.

In her work as Member of the European Parliament, Ripa does work on her core-themes in environment protection, climate protection, biodiversity protection, animal welfare and consumer protection.

=== Other activities ===
Ripa is the main initiator and spokesperson for the European Citizens' Initiative "Save the bees! Protection of biodiversity and improvements of habitats for insects in Europe", which succeeds the Bavarian public campaign "Save the bees!". The European Citizens' Initiative "Save the bees! Protection of biodiversity and improvements of habitats for insects in Europe" joined forces with the European Citizens' Initiative "Save Bees and Farmers".

== Private life ==
Ripa lives between Saarbrücken and Brussels, is married and the mother of two children.
