= Ecological Democratic Party =

Conservative ecologist political party in Germany

Ecological Democratic Party Ökologisch-Demokratische Partei
- Abbreviation: ÖDP
- Leader: Günther Brendle-Behnisch/Kirsten Jäkel
- Founded: 23/24 January 1982
- Headquarters: ÖDP-Federal Office Würzburg; Pommergasse 1 D-97070 Würzburg
- Youth wing: Junge Ökologen
- Membership (2024): ▼7,200
- Ideology: Green conservatism Social conservatism Left conservatism Catholic left Degrowth
- Political position: Centre-left
- European affiliation: EUDemocrats (2014–2020) (Note: Klaus Buchner was a direct member); EFA (since 2020) (Note: Manuela Ripa is direct member)
- European Parliament group: Greens/EFA (2014–2024); EPP Group (since 2024)
- International affiliation: World Ecological Parties
- Colours: Orange
- Bundestag: 0 / 630
- European Parliament: 1 / 96
- State Parliaments: 0 / 1,889

Website
- oedp.de
- Politics of Germany; Political parties; Elections; A: Initially considered centre-right, the party had undergone a "profound shift to the left" in the 2000s, and moved towards the centre-left. It is also described as left-Catholic, and political scientist Uwe Kranenpohl argues that left-wing tendencies dominate in the ÖDP.

The Ecological Democratic Party (German: Ökologisch-Demokratische Partei, ÖDP, sometimes stylized as ödp) is a green conservative and ecologist minor party in Germany. The ÖDP was founded in 1982.

The strongest level of voting support for the ÖDP is in Bavaria, where in federal state elections they have remained stable with 1.6-2% of the votes since 1990, and at municipal level have increased their mandate count in 2014 from 320 to around 380. The ÖDP is a member of the World Ecological Parties organization.

== History ==
The Ecological Democratic Party is a green party that is active throughout Germany and has its clear focus in Bavaria.

The party's rise is closely linked to its founder, the politician and environmentalist Herbert Gruhl. Gruhl was Member of the Bundestag from 1969 to 1980 and member of CDU. The founding of ÖDP dates back on the ecological movement in the 1970s. Gruhl gained attention by publishing a best-seller in 1975: "Ein Planet wird geplündert" (A Planet is Being Plundered). In the book he criticized the growth-oriented economy of industrial society. He also attacked nuclear energy policy and thus represented a clear minority position among Christian Democrats, while an intensive discussion was already developing in the SPD about a possible nuclear phase-out. Gruhl left the CDU in 1978 but stayed as non-partisan member of the Bundestag until 1980. He founded the "Grüne Aktion Zukunft" (GAZ), which later became part of The Greens. Gruhl lost the election for party chairman. Gruhl had a more conservative consistent life ethic ("Lebensschutzkonzeption"), which addresses besides environmentalism also the rejection of abortion, euthanasia and the death penalty. Also his policy was referred as ethno-centric. Gruhl left the Greens and, in 1982, founded the ÖDP.

Though a minor party – it has not gained seats in a state parliament or in the Bundestag – the ÖDP became notable for its involvement in the opposition to a Czech nuclear reactor in Temelín, across the border from Bavaria. It led an initiative for a popular referendum to abolish the Bavarian Senate (that state's upper house) which was successful.

It brought a lawsuit against a law in North Rhine-Westphalia which requires parties to receive 5% of the vote in order to take their seats in local councils, as well as a national law which reserves state financing only for parties that received more than one percent of the vote in at least three state elections; both laws were overturned.

Sebastian Frankenberger from Passau was the federal chairman of the ÖDP from 2010 to 2014 and initiated the successful referendum for non-smokers protection (For genuine protection against smoking!) in Bavaria.

In 2011, the 5% election threshold for EU Parliament elections was ruled unconstitutional by the Federal Constitutional Court. The Bundestag later passed a 3% threshold, however this was overturned by the constitutional court in February 2014, just two months before the 2014 European parliament elections. Following this decision to remove an election threshold, the 2014 European Parliament election in Germany saw the ÖDP receive 0.6% of the national vote (185,119 votes in total) which was enough to return their first MEP. The MEP, Klaus Buchner, joined The Greens–European Free Alliance (Greens/EFA) parliamentary group. In the 2019 European parliament elections, the party received 1.0% of the national vote (369,869 votes in total). Klaus Buchner was re-elected to the European Parliament, however he was replaced in July 2020 with Manuela Ripa. In the 2024 European parliament elections, the party received a decreased 0.7% of the national vote (257,968 votes in total). Manuela Ripa was re-elected to the European parliament. Shortly after the election, she switched her EU parliamentary grouping membership to the European People's Party Group, although she is a European political party member of the European Free Alliance.

== Ideology ==
In its peak in the 1990s, the political position of the party was unclear. Most political scientists considered the party to be nominally right of centre; German political scientist Jürgen Wüst called the party centre-right in 1993, citing its ideological proximity to Catholic philosopher Robert Spaemann. The party repositioned itself following the electoral collapse and loss of many members in early 2000s: it lost two-thirds of its electorate in the 2002 federal election, and did not participate in the 2005 federal election at all. Afterwards, the ÖDP had undergone a "profound shift to the left". Since 2005, the party has been described as centre-left by German political scientists such as Heinz-Siegfried Strelow. In 2025, the party has been described as "rather left", and placed on the left-authoritarian spectrum, as an economically left-wing and socially conservative party.

Some commentators have said that the party has moved over the years in a more progressive direction regarding some issues since the mid-2000s. In many issues it emphasizes, such as the environment and trade, it is similar to the Alliance '90/The Greens. It differs from them by being less supportive of immigration and restrictions on state powers in criminal justice issues, not focusing on gay and lesbian rights as part of its platform, and having a differing view of feminism. It was one of the earliest supporters (since 1989) of a green tax shift, an idea which later gained broader support and has been partially implemented in Germany since the Social Democratic Party and The Greens were elected to form the Federal government in 1998.

The party is predominantly Catholic - according to a 2008 survey, 70% of the party was composed of Catholics. A majority (55%) of the party members attend religious services at least monthly, which is higher than in Christian confessional parties like the CDU and CSU. The ÖDP is influenced by Catholicism in many of its programmatic stances - it strongly opposes restricting the right to asylum, harsher criminal punishment, and abortion. Additionally, the ÖDP strongly support an extension of the German welfare state and a complete nuclear phase-out. According to Uwe Kranenpohl, the ÖDP's opposition to abortion is even stronger than in CDU/CSU:

The attitudes towards the abortion issue are particularly noteworthy: unsurprisingly, the differences between the members of the ÖDP and the Greens are greatest here - the former reject liberalisation to the same extent as the latter support it - but a third of CDU and CSU members are also in favour of less strict regulation of this issue, which also reveals clear differences with the ÖDP. […] In terms of their denominational structure and church affiliation, the ÖDP is similar to the members of the CDU/CSU party, but draw different conclusions from their Christian orientation and consistently and to a large extent consensually represent the concept of comprehensive protection of life: these core points of the party program therefore reflect the political convictions of the members very well and are able to act as a bracket for the ‘Christian Greens’.

The party is said to follow Christian values, and the German political scientist Oliver Geden described the party as "left-Catholic". It is also said to be morally conservative. Following the Catholic social teaching, a central principle of the party's program is "respect for life", which is considered "sacred in all its forms". This results in demands for the protection of nature and the environment and a fundamental scepticism towards "artificial" interventions in nature. In this, the party includes abortion, euthanasia and medical interventions to prolong life. To this end, the party opposes abortion, euthanasia and the death penalty.

The party's focus in environmentalism, which is often combined with moral conservatism - for example, its 2009 "for real non-smoking protection" campaign that attracted national attention condemned smoking on both environmental and moral grounds. The party proposes more restrictions and harsher persecution of violence and pornography in the media. It spoke for abolishing the gender quota in Germany.

Economically, the party is left-wing and committed to degrowth. It focuses on sustainable economics, and calls for Germany to have 100% of its energy from renewable sources, a comprehensive "mobility transition" that would reduce car traffic by at least 50%, a publicly-owned national water supply, and an introduction of universal basic income for parents to cover the material costs of children. It also proposes appropriate housing of animals in agriculture, efforts to reduce meat consumption, ecological restructuring of agriculture, and an immediate shutdown of nuclear power plants. It supports increasing the minimum wage, a 35-hour work week, capping rental prices, raising the top tax rate, "rail before road" public projects, and allocation of property tax to tenants. It spoke against restricting the right to strike, and opposes public debt brakes and removal of tariffs.

== Controversy ==
On 17 December 2014, a member of the Memmingen/Unterallgäu chapter of the ÖDP said at a meeting, that the proposed gender mainstreaming law was a "state license to corrupt children" and would give LGBT individuals "too much influence over a passive majority", and that LGBT individuals should not be allowed to marry. Party secretary Pablo Ziller said that the party's federal board was "disappointed" at the remarks and that the statements did not represent the party's position. According to Ziller, the party believes in extending marriage rights to same-sex couples.

== Leaders ==
The current leader of the party is Charlotte Schmid. She succeeded Christian Rechholz in October 2022.

== Election results ==
=== Federal parliament (Bundestag) ===
Election	Constituency vote			Party list vote			Seats	+/-
Election	Votes	%	+/-	Votes	%	+/-	Seats	+/-
1983	3,341	0.0	New	11,028	0.0	New	0 / 520	Steady
1987	40,765	0.1	▲0.1	109,152	0.3	▲0.3	0 / 519	Steady
1990	243,469	0.5	▲0.2	205,206	0.4	▲0.1	0 / 662	Steady
1994	200,138	0.4	▼0.1	183,715	0.4	Steady	0 / 672	Steady
1998	145,308	0.3	▼0.1	98,257	0.2	▼0.2	0 / 669	Steady
2002	56,593	0.1	▼0.2	56,898	0.1	▼0.1	0 / 603	Steady
2005	did not participate							
2009	105,653	0.2	▲0.2	132,249	0.3	▲0.3	0 / 622	Steady
2013	128,209	0.3	▲0.1	127,088	0.3	Steady	0 / 631	Steady
2017	166,228	0.4	▲0.1	144,809	0.3	Steady	0 / 709	Steady
2021	152,886	0.3	▼0.1	112,351	0.2	▼0.1	0 / 736	Steady
2025	54,641	0.1	▼0.1	49,730	0.1	▼0.1	0 / 630	Steady

=== European Parliament ===
ODP support in the 2014 European Parliament election in Germany

ODP support in the 2024 European Parliament election in Germany

Election	Votes	%	Seats	+/–	EP Group
1984	77,026	0.31 (#10)	0 / 81	New	–
1989	184,309	0.65 (#8)	0 / 81	0	–
1994	273,776	0.77 (#10)	0 / 99	0	–
1999	100,048	0.37 (#12)	0 / 99	0	–
2004	145,537	0.56 (#12)	0 / 99	0	–
2009	134,893	0.51 (#13)	0 / 99	0	–
2014	185,244	0.63 (#13)	1 / 96	▲1	G/EFA
2019	370,006	0.99 (#11)	1 / 96	0	G/EFA
2024	257,968	0.65 (#13)	1 / 96	0	EPP

=== State parliaments (Landtags) ===
The following table shows the results of the most recent state elections the party contested:

State parliament	Election	Votes	%	Seats	+/–	Status
Baden-Württemberg	2021	37,819	0.8 (#12)	0 / 154	0	No seats
Bavaria	2023	117,805	1.7 (#9)	0 / 203	0	No seats
Berlin	2023	1,682	0.1 (#23)	0 / 147	0	No seats
Brandenburg	2019	7,237	0.6 (#10)	0 / 88	New	No seats
Bremen	2023	5,488	0.4 (#12)	0 / 87	New	No seats
Hamburg	2025	6,571	0.2 (#14)	0 / 121	0	No seats
Hesse	2023	5,906	0.2 (#15)	0 / 133	0	No seats
Lower Saxony	2022	526	0.0 (#18)	0 / 137	0	No seats
Mecklenburg-Vorpommern	2021	936	0.1 (#19)	0 / 79	New	No seats
North Rhine-Westphalia	2022	9,664	0.1 (#15)	0 / 195	0	No seats
Rhineland-Palatinate	2021	13,406	0.7 (#12)	0 / 101	0	No seats
Saarland	2022	613	0.1 (#15)	0 / 51	New	No seats
Saxony	2024	1,955	0.1 (#18)	0 / 120	0	No seats
Saxony-Anhalt	2021	1,062	0.1 (#20)	0 / 97	New	No seats
Thuringia	2024	2,389	0.2 (#14)	0 / 88	0	No seats
