= Mayada Ashraf =

Egyptian journalist

- Born: ca. 1992
- Died: March 28, 2014 (aged 21-22); Ain Shams, Cairo, Egypt
- Cause of death: Gunshot wound to the head
- Education: Cairo University (Faculty of Mass Communications)
- Occupations: Journalist, freelance reporter, and Co-founder of electronic Al-Dostour edition
- Organization(s): Al-Dustour print and online newspaper and Masr Alarabia
- Known for: Covering clash between Muslim Brotherhood and Egyptian security forces

Mayada Ashraf (ca. 1992 – March 28, 2014), an Egyptian journalist for Al-Dostour in Cairo, Egypt, was killed by gunfire while covering the protest against the government of President Abdel Fattah el-Sisi by supporters of ousted President Mohamed Morsi and the Muslim Brotherhood in Egypt in the Ain Shams district of east Cairo. Ashraf was confirmed to have been fatally shot in the back of her head killing her on the scene. Her funeral was held on March 29, 2014, in Estanhaa Village at El Monotia.

Her case is known in Egypt as one of the "Ain Shams incidents" among the Post-coup unrest in Egypt (2013–2014) because Ains Shams is the district around the Ain Shams University with a demographic of Morsy supporters, and is a site where there were multiple protests.

== Personal life ==
Mayada Ashraf, 22 or 23 years of age at the time of death, was born in Egypt. Ashraf was the daughter of Azza Ashraf, mother, and Ashraf A. Ashraf. father. She graduated with a degree in Mass Communications at Cairo University one year before her death. Her funeral was held on March 29, 2014, in Estanhaa village at El Monofia, Monufia Governorate.

== Career ==
Mayada Ashraf was a field reporter for the Al-Dustour newspaper, as well as a free-lance journalist for the Masr Alarabia news website. Ashraf was the co-founder, along with Essam Nabawi, of the electronic edition of the Al-Dostour paper. Ashraf covered protests previously for Al-Dostour.

Months before her death, she wrote, "Morsi is not worth dying for, but el-Sisi is also not worth renouncing our humanity for."

== Death ==
The Ain Shams is a neighborhood located in the capital city Cairo, Egypt. The Estanhaa village at El-Monofia is located in the outskirts of Cairo.

Mayada Ashraf was killed on Friday March 28, 2014, while covering the clashes between the Muslim Brotherhood and the Egyptian police in one of the many anti-el-Sisi protests in the Ain Shams district of Egypt. This district is near Ain Shams University. The clashes began after President Morsi was ousted by the 30th June Revolution and Morsi supporters demanded the resignation of el-Sisi. The account from the Morsi supporters say Ashraf was fatally shot in the head in the midst of police fire while reporting on an anti-el-Sisi demonstration. In the official account and the one supported by Al-Dostour, Ashraf's last report said that the shots were being fired by Morsi supporters into the crowd. Ashraf was proclaimed dead in the suburb area of Ain Shams in Cairo with a gunshot wound to the head. In the event of Mayada's death, Al-Dostour claimed to have made pleas publicly on the online news website for help to be sent to the location to take Ashraf's body out of Ain Shams. Due to the crowded streets filled with protesters the ambulance called was unable to reach Ashraf in time to save her, leading to her on site death in Ain Shams.

=== Prosecution ===
Around 100 people were arrested at the protest. A judge ordered a trial for 48 of those involved in the protest, 13 of which were not in custody, who were suspected of being accountable for Mayada Ashraf's murder, as well as that of other casualties or for belonging to the Muslim Brotherhood and charged with terrorism. The prosecutor in the case said it had 25 confessions. The three killed in protest were Ashraf; Mary Sameh George, a female Coptic Christian; and Sherif Abdul Raouf, a male adolescent. Some reports said that a fourth person was also killed.

== Context ==
Anti-el-Sisi demonstrations were fueled by the anger of supporters of President Mohammad Morsi after Morsi was overthrown in a coup led by Abdel Fattah el-Sisi. Clashes between Morsi supporters and the government erupted after el-Sisi took over and proclaimed the Muslim Brotherhood a terrorist organization and Morsi an accomplice. The Muslim Brotherhood, which has been condemned by many nations as a terrorist group, had a part in the protests against el-Sisi.

== Impact ==
Mayada Ashraf was the fifth journalist out of 10 to be killed while reporting on clashes in Cairo, Egypt since June 30. She was one of 66 journalists killed worldwide in the year 2016. The death of Mayada Ashraf has led to the continued fight for the safety of journalists in Egypt with a push for more protective equipment and bullet-proof vests. She recommended as a Martyr of the Revolution to Prime Minister Ibrahim Mahlab.

== Reactions ==
Irina Bokova, director-general of UNESCO, said, "I deplore the murder of Mayada Ashraf, killed while carrying out her professional duty to inform the public " the Director-General said. "I count on the government to do everything possible to shed light on this crime and bring the authors to justice. Journalists must be able to do their job without fearing for their lives. This is key for upholding the right to freedom of expression, one of the pillars of democratic society."

Reporters Without Borders released a statement, "We offer our heartfelt condolences to Ashraf's family and colleagues and we urge the competent authorities to carry out an independent and impartial investigation to ensure that this crime does not go unpunished."

Jim Boumelha, president of International Federation of Journalists, said, "This is not about the political blame game or settling political scores, it is about ensuring that press freedom is upheld and making sure that the perpetrators of this brutal murder face the full weight of justice for their crime."

Nada Rashwan, an Egyptian journalist, said, "It's frightening on more than one level, the indiscriminate force used in quelling protests, the manipulation of the truth by the shamelessly biased media, and how people have been desensitized by the repetition of violent scenes. The brutal murder of a young woman in broad daylight does not seem to shock anyone."
