= Klaus Buchner =

German politician and physicist

Klaus Buchner MEP
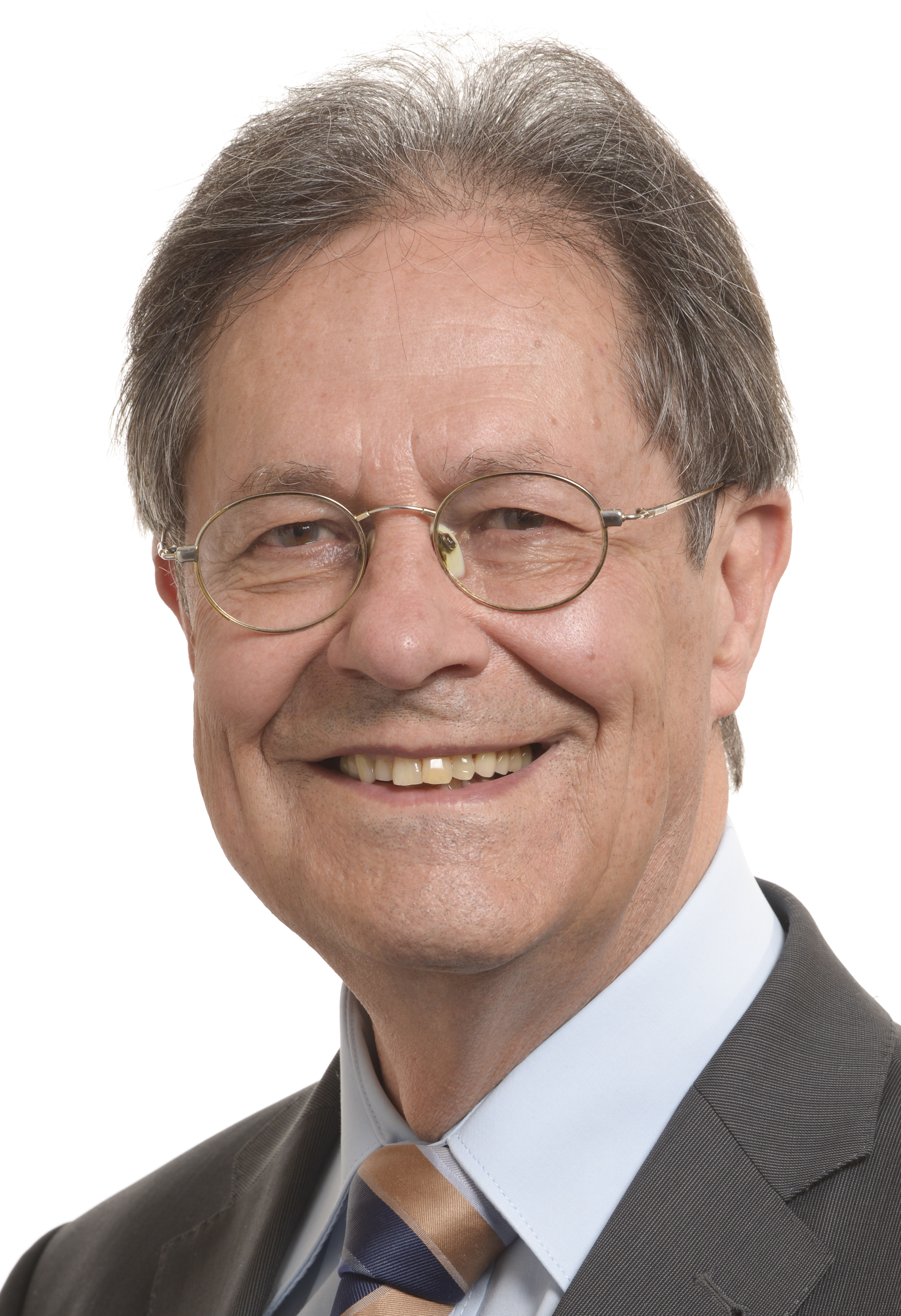

Member of the European Parliament
- In office 1 July 2014 – 15 July 2020
- Succeeded by: Manuela Ripa
- Constituency: Germany

Personal details
- Born: 6 February 1941 (age 85) Munich, Germany
- Party: German; Ecological Democratic Party; EU; Greens-European Free Alliance

Klaus Buchner (born 6 February 1941) is a German university professor, physicist, and former MEP for the green-conservative Ecological Democratic Party (ÖDP). He represented the European Parliament Germany constituency from 2014 until July 2020, and sat with the Greens–European Free Alliance group in the European Parliament. He was Leader of the ÖDP from 2003 to 2010. Buchner is a fellow of the European Institute for International Law and International Relations.
