= Mohammed Ragab Ahmad =

Egyptian politician

Mohammed Ragab Ahmad is an Egyptian politician. He was the head of the Representative Group of the ruling National Democratic Party in the Shoura Council of Egypt. In 2011, he and twenty other members were removed from the party following a corruption case. He was also a member of the African Union's Pan-African Parliament.
