= Gameela Ismail =

Egyptian politician

- جميلة إسماعيل
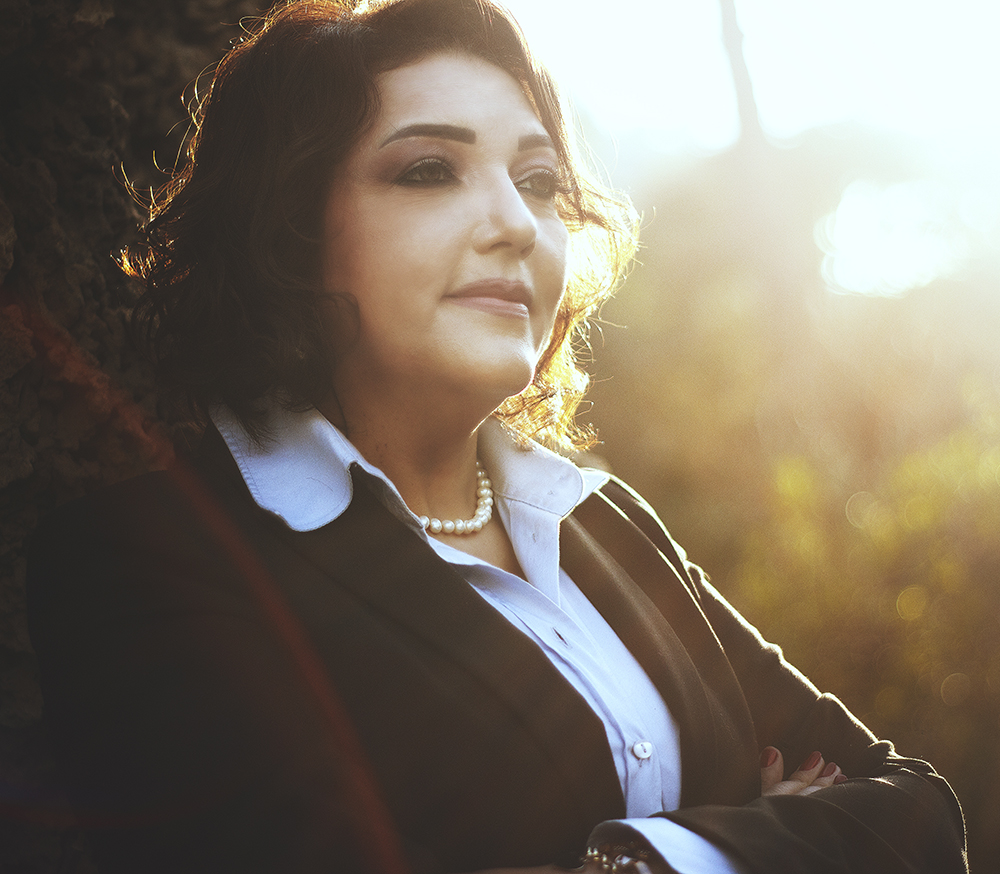

Leader of the Constitution Party
- In office July 2022 – ca. May 2026
- Succeeded by: Wafaa Sabry

Politician

Personal details
- Born: 1966 (age 59–60) Cairo, Egypt
- Party: Constitution Party

Gameela Muhammad Ismail Muhammad (Arabic: جميلة محمد إسماعيل محمد; born 1966) is an Egyptian politician, activist, former television presenter and the former head of the Constitution Party. She was actively involved in calling for and participating in the January 25 Revolution.

== Background, education, and family life ==
Ismail was formerly married to politician Ayman Nour. They have two sons.

== Career ==
Ismail was a stringer for Newsweek and was also a presenter on state television.

=== Political involvement before 2011 ===
She was the head of the El-Ghad Party while Nour was imprisoned.

She challenged Mohammed Ragab Ahmad, the National Democratic Party's Shura Council spokesperson, in the El Gamaliya district, during the 2007 Egyptian Shura Council election.

She ran in the 2010 Egyptian parliamentary election in the Qasr El-Nil district. She also founded Egyptian Women for Change.

=== Involvement in the January 25 Revolution ===
In August 2014, Mubarak-era Interior Minister Habib al-Adly accused Ismail and others of "setting police stations ablaze with Molotov cocktails" during the 18-day uprising.

=== After January 25 ===
Ismail unsuccessfully ran for the leadership of the Constitution Party in February 2014, and was defeated by Hala Shukrallah, placing second with 57 votes.

She was elected head of the Constitution Party in July 2022, defeating Khaled Dawoud with 318 votes to his 192 votes. In September 2023 she announced her candidacy for the 2023 Egyptian presidential election. She withdrew from the election on 11 October after the Constitution Party held a meeting the previous day in which they refused to allow her to run as a candidate.

The party plans to hold a leadership election in 2026, with the window for nominations starting on 25 January, though Ismail does not anticipate that she will be a candidate. Ismail was succeeded by Wafaa Sabry.
