= Al-Dustour (Egypt) =

Egyptian newspaper

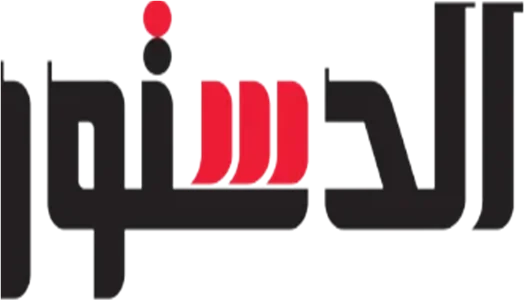
- Frequency: Daily
- Publisher: Al-Dustour Foundation for Press and Publication, United Media Services
- Founded: 1995; 31 years ago
- Company: Egyptian Media Group
- Country: Egypt
- Based in: Cairo
- Language: Arabic
- Website: www.dostor.org

Al-Dostour (also Al-Dostor; Arabic: الدستور, lit. 'The Constitution', Arabic: [Al dosˈtuːr, edːosˈtuːr]) is a private Egyptian daily newspaper.

== History and profile ==
Al Dustour was first published in December 1995 and is published weekly in Arabic. The paper was originally published with a registration in Cyprus in order to get around the restrictive newspaper publication laws in Egypt during the Mubarak era. It was financed by Essam Fahmy Ismail, who chose its original editor in chief, Ibrahim Eissa. In 2010, Essam Fahmy agreed to sell the newspaper to Reda Edouard, a businessman with alleged connections to the ruling regime, who remains at the head of the newspaper's board today. Edouard replaced Eissa with Esam Nabawy.

It started as a weekly newspaper published on Wednesdays. It later came to be issued both daily and weekly. Al-Dostour's popularity grew quickly after its founding. It became known for its colloquial style and wide use of cartoons. The paper published articles on current affairs written by various leading figures of the Muslim Brotherhood.

== Al-Dustour and the Egyptian government ==
Since the day of its first issue, Al-Dustour has been harshly critical of the government, formerly that of the Egyptian president Hosni Mubarak, his family, and the former ruling party, The National Democratic Party (NDP). It was one of Egypt's top critics of Mubarak's 30-year rule. It introduced unprecedented cartoons of Mubarak and showed sharp opposition to his son Gamal Mubarak's likely succession to power.

In 1998, Al-Dustour published a statement attributed to the al-Gama'a al-Islamiyya militant group in 1998, that threatened the lives of three Christian businessmen. The Egyptian Ministry of Information closed down the paper. It considered the statement unacceptable and a potential cause of sectarian strife. Seven years later, on March 23, 2005, the paper was revived, initially being published every Wednesday, and since 31 March 2007 it has been issued both daily and weekly.

In 2007, Al-Dustour's former editor-in-chief, Ibrahim Eissa, was arrested, then freed on bail on 13 September 2007 pending an appellate court decision in a sentence of a year-long prison term and a fine of 20,000 Egyptian Pound (≈ US$3,800 at the time). He and three other independent Egyptian newspaper editors, Wael El Abrashy of Sawt Al-Umma, Adel Hammouda of Al-Fajr, and Al-Karama's former editor Abdel Halim Kandil, were charged with "insulting the Egyptian president and publishing false information likely to disturb public order."

In 2008, in a separate case, Eissa was again arrested and sentenced to six months, later reduced to two months in prison, on 26 March 2008, by the Boulak Abo El Ela Court of Misdemeanor for publishing "false information concerning Mubarak's health harming public security and the country's economy" due to articles and headlines in Al-Dustour speculating on the health of the 80-year-old president. Governmental authorities alleged that Eissa's articles caused a withdrawal of foreign investment in the Egyptian economy equivalent to US$350 million. Eissa was freed, a second time, on bail of 200 EP (≈ US$37 at the time) to hold off on implementation of the verdict until another appeal.

On 6 October 2008, Mubarak announced that he would pardon Eissa, the first time that such a pardon had been issued in the history of the modern Egyptian press. Al-Dustour praised the pardon in its pages and asked the president to honor his promise to cancel custodial sentences in cases of publication.

The paper has continued its opposition role under new President Mohamed Morsi. In September 2012, its former editor-in-chief, Islam Afify, was charged by a Cairo court with "defaming the president" and "harming the public interest with inflammatory articles'" and his travel privileges were revoked. Al-Dustour frequently criticized the Muslim Brotherhood, accusing it of intentions to make Egypt an Islamic state. Afify was jailed temporarily but later released due to the new president's decision to end pretrial detention for journalists.

At the time of Mubarak's departure (February 2011), Al-Dostour was the fifth largest daily newspaper in Egypt, with a daily edition selling 45,000 and weekly edition selling 85,000 copies.

On 28 March 2014 the 22-year-old photograph and journalist of the newspaper Mayada Ashraf was killed among three others, in the clashes between the demonstrators and the security forces in the suburb of Ain Shams.
