= Ayman Nour =

Egyptian politician

Ayman Nour أيمن نور
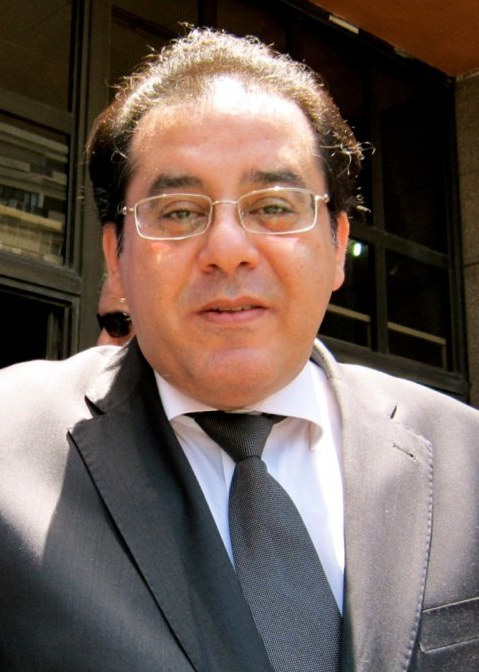

Member of the Magles El-Sha’ab
- In office December 1995 – 12 December 2005

Personal details
- Born: 5 December 1964 (age 61) Alexandria, Egypt
- Party: Ghad El-Thawra Party (2011–present)
- Other political affiliations: New Wafd Party (until 2001); El-Ghad Party (2001–2011)
- Education: Mansoura University

Ayman Abd El Aziz Nour (Arabic: أيمن عبد العزيز نور, IPA: [ˈʔæjmæn ʕæbdelʕæˈziːz ˈnuːɾ]; born 5 December 1964) is an Egyptian politician, a former member of the Egyptian Parliament, founder and chairman of the El Ghad party.

Nour was the first person to compete against President Hosni Mubarak in the 2005 presidential election. Shortly after announcing his candidacy, he was stripped of his parliamentary immunity and arrested on 29 January 2005, a move that was widely criticized by governments around the world as a step backwards for Egyptian democracy. Under international pressure, Nour was released to participate in the election, which was widely considered to be corrupt and rigged. His presidential bid was ultimately unsuccessful. He was arrested again shortly afterward and released nearly five years later.

== Political career ==
He was a member of the New Wafd Party until he was removed from the party by Numan Gumaa, who succeeded former party leader Fouad Serageddin.

Nour was named the first secretary of Misr Party and the editor-in-chief of the party's newspaper with the same name in October 2001.

=== 2005 election and arrest ===
Nour was the first person to ever compete against President Hosni Mubarak in the 2005 presidential election. Shortly after announcing his candidacy for president, Nour was stripped of his parliamentary immunity and arrested on 29 January 2005. He was charged with forging PAs (Powers of Attorney) to secure the formation of the el-Ghad party. The arrest, occurring in an election year, was widely criticized by governments around the world as a step backwards for Egyptian democracy. Few seem to regard the charges as legitimate. Nour remained active despite his imprisonment, using the opportunity to write critical articles and make his case and cause better known.

In February 2005, Condoleezza Rice abruptly postponed a visit to Egypt, reflecting U.S. displeasure at the jailing of Nour, who was reported to have been brutally interrogated. That same month, the government announced that it would open elections to multiple candidates in the following month.

In March 2005, following a strong intervention in Cairo by a group of members of the European Parliament led by Vice-President Edward McMillan-Scott (UK, Conservative), Nour was freed and began a campaign for the Egyptian presidency.

In the election in September 2005, Nour was the first runner-up, with 7% of the vote according to government figures and estimated at 13% by independent observers, although none of them were allowed to monitor the elections. Shortly after placing a distant second, in what are widely believed to have been corrupt elections, he was again imprisoned by Mubarak under allegations of "forgery" which were widely criticized to have been politically motivated and corrupt charges.

On 24 December 2005, he was sentenced to five years in jail. Though diabetic, Nour engaged in a two-week-long hunger strike to protest against his trial. Nour's verdict and sentencing made global headlines and were the first item of news on many international news broadcasts, including the BBC.

On the day of Nour's guilty verdict and sentencing, the White House Press Secretary released the following statement denouncing the government's action:

The United States is deeply troubled by the conviction today of Egyptian politician Ayman Nour by an Egyptian court. The conviction of Mr. Nour, the runner-up in Egypt's 2005 presidential elections, calls into question Egypt's commitment to democracy, freedom, and the rule of law. We are also disturbed by reports that Mr Nour's health has seriously declined due to the hunger strike on which he has embarked in protest of the conditions of his trial and detention. The United States calls upon the Egyptian government to act under the laws of Egypt in the spirit of its professed desire for increased political openness and dialogue within Egyptian society, and out of humanitarian concern, to release Mr Nour from detention.

In February 2006, Rice visited Mubarak yet never spoke Nour's name publicly. When asked about him at a news conference, she referred to his situation as one of Egypt's setbacks. Days later, Mubarak told a government newspaper that Rice "didn't bring up difficult issues or ask to change anything". From prison, Nour stated "I pay the price when [Rice] speaks [of me], and I pay the price when she doesn't", Nour said. "But what's happening to me now is a message to everybody."

In June 2007, President Bush, speaking at a conference of dissidents in the Czech Republic, revisited the issue of Ayman Nour, saying:

There are many dissidents who couldn't join us because they are being unjustly imprisoned or held under house arrest. I look forward to the day when a conference like this one [can] include Alexander Kozulin of Belarus, Aung San Suu Kyi of Burma, Oscar Elias Biscet of Cuba, Father Nguyen Van Ly of Vietnam, Ayman Nour of Egypt (applause). The daughter of one of these political prisoners is in this room. I would like to say to her, and all the families: I thank you for your courage. I pray for your comfort and strength. And I call for the immediate and unconditional release of your loved ones.

...

I have asked Secretary Rice to send a directive to every U.S. ambassador in an un-free nation: Seek out and meet with activists for democracy. Seek out those who demand human rights.

Nour was released, officially on health grounds, on 18 February 2009, just a few months before he would have completed his prison sentence. It has been alleged that his release from prison was due to new U.S. President Barack Obama demanding his release as a condition to meet with Mubarak.

=== Post-Mubarak period ===
Following the fall of Mubarak in the 2011 revolution, Nour intended to run for the 2012 Egyptian presidential election, but was disqualified by the Presidential Election Commission due to his imprisonment after the 2005 election.

Nour left Egypt following the 2013 Egyptian coup d'état. In 2014, he spent time in Lebanon for treatment of a wound he sustained while in prison. He now resides in Istanbul and expresses his hope for returning to Egypt.

In December 2019, Nour launched the Egyptian National Action Group (ENAG), a group of Egyptian expatriates calling for an end to military rule in Egypt.

In December 2021, the University of Toronto's Citizen Lab reported that Nour's phone had been infected with the Predator and Pegasus spywares.

== Personal life ==
Nour married Gameela Ismail in 1989. They have two children and divorced in 2009.

== See also ==
- Asmaa Mahfouz
- Kefaya
- Saad Eddin Ibrahim
- Nonviolent resistance
- List of 2006 human rights incidents in Egypt
