= El-Ghad Party =

Political party in Egypt

el-Ghad Party Hizb el-Ghad حزب الغد
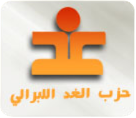
- logo until 2011
- Leader: Ayman Nour (2004–2011; Moussa Mostafa Moussa (2011–present)
- Chairperson: Moussa Mostafa Moussa
- Founders: Ayman Nour and Wael Nawara
- Founded: 2001
- Headquarters: Cairo
- Newspaper: El-Ghad
- Ideology: Secularism; Liberalism; Reformism
- Political position: Centre
- National affiliation: Egyptian Front; National Unified List for Egypt (since 2020)
- Colors: Orange (Historically)
- Slogan: Hand in Hand, we build tomorrow
- House of Representatives: 0 / 568

Party flag

Website
- www.elghad.com

The el-Ghad Party (Arabic: حزب الغد Ḥizb el-Ghad, IPA: [ˈħezb elˈɣæd]; "The Tomorrow Party") is a political party in Egypt that was granted license in October 2004. El-Ghad is a centrist liberal secular political party pressing for widening the scope of political participation and for a peaceful rotation of power.

== Background ==
Ayman Nour left the New Wafd Party in 2001. He was named the first secretary of the party in October that year. The party was legalized in 2004. After facing president Hosni Mubarak in the 2005 Egyptian presidential election, Nour was sentenced to five years in jail on forgery charges.

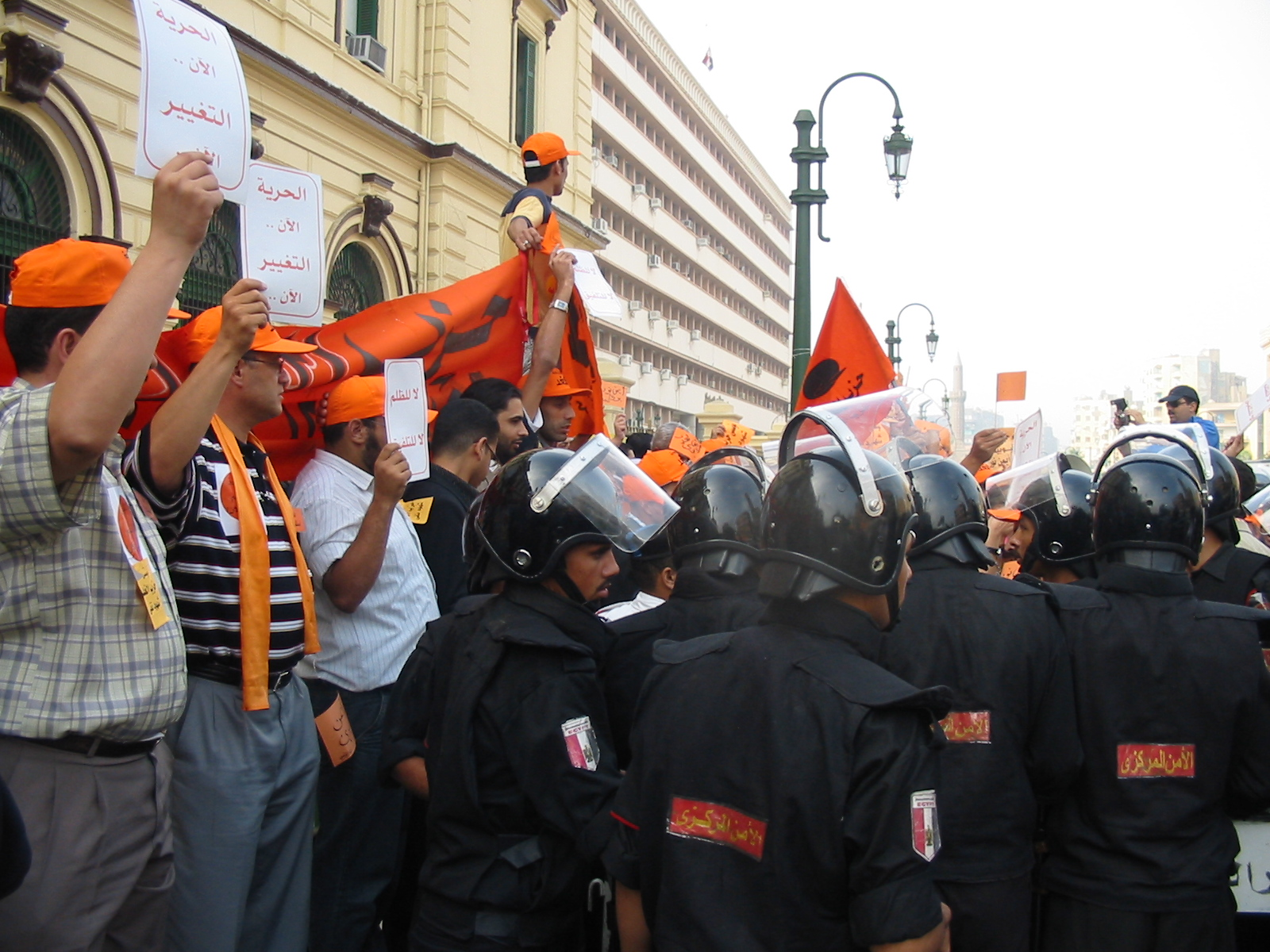
Members of the el-Ghad party and Ayman Nour's Supporters holding the party's flag protesting Ayman Nour's trial and imprisonment, 2006.

In 2005, just before Nour being sentenced, the El-Ghad party split in two factions. One was headed by Moussa Moustafa Moussa, the other by Nour's (now former) wife Gameela Ismail. Legal battle ensued between both factions, both claiming legitimacy and simultaneously using the party name and insignia. The final court ruling in May 2011 was in favor of Moussa. Ayman Nour hence filed for a new party, Ghad El-Thawra Party or "Revolution's Tomorrow Party", which was approved on 9 October 2011.

The removal of Nour from the party leadership by Moussa, and the latter's election to the Egyptian Upper House, have been seen as compliance with the Hosni Mubarak regime.

== History ==
The official El-Ghad Party, headed by Moussa Moustafa Moussa, ran in the 2011–12 Egyptian parliamentary election as an independent list. The split faction Ghad El-Thawra Party, headed by Ayman Nour, was part of the Muslim Brotherhood's Freedom and Justice Party-led Democratic Alliance for Egypt.

The party joined the Egyptian Front in August 2014.

It contested the 2020 Egyptian Senate election as part of the National Unified List for Egypt.

== Platform ==
The party platform calls for:

- Political and economic reform.
- Paying a special care for the handicapped.
- Combating drug addiction.
- Solving the water crisis.

== Name confusion ==
Ayman Nour has been tightly associated with both the El-Ghad name and party, even being accused of internal monopoly by other party members. Since both Nour and Moussa factions were using (and still are) the same name and insignia (ex: Ghad El-Thawra website), it was often difficult to tell them apart. For instance, Liberal International listed El-Ghad, specifying its leader as Ayman Nour, as an observer member. Many poll and media outlets used the term "El-Ghad" without specifying which party or faction they are referring to, although they often meant the Ayman Nour Ghad El-Thawra faction.

== See also ==
- Liberalism in Egypt
- Ghad El-Thawra Party
